= Nokia Browser for Symbian =

Mobile web browser

Web Browser for S60
- Developer: Nokia
- Stable release: 8.3.2
- Operating system: Symbian OS
- Platform: S60 platform
- License: BSD
- Website: browser.nokia.com (offline)

Nokia Browser for Symbian (formerly known as Web Browser for S60) was the default web browser for the S60 and Symbian mobile phone platform. The browser is based on a port of Apple Inc.'s open-source WebCore and JavaScriptCore frameworks which form the WebKit rendering engine that Apple uses in its Safari Web browser.

== History ==
Nokia announced porting WebKit to the S60 Browser in June 2005, and made it available in November. At the 2006 World Wide Web Conference, Nokia announced that it was releasing the source code for its port of WebKit back to the community.

The version that shipped with S60 3rd Edition devices (pre-Feature Pack 1) lacked support for the Wireless Application Protocol (WAP) and Wireless Markup Language (WML). The previous browser was pre-installed on these devices to service sites that used these technologies, and could be accessed through the Services application. The new browser is referred to in some technical documentation as the OSS Browser, to distinguish it from the older WAP browser. In S60 3rd Edition Feature Pack 1, these features, along with Flash Lite 2.0 support and minor user interface refinements, are integrated into the new browser (a.k.a OSS Browser 3.1). Some devices running this version of S60 received support for Flash Lite 3.0 through firmware updates.

The version that shipped with S60 3rd Edition Feature Pack 2 (a.k.a OSS Browser 3.2) added Flash Lite 3.0 and Web Run-Time (WRT) support. Version 7.0 shipped with the Nokia 5800 XpressMusic, Nokia 5530 XpressMusic and Nokia 5230, and came with a user interface optimised for S60 5th Edition.

Version 7.1 added kinetic scrolling of web pages and a full screen mode.

Version 7.2 added support for multi-touch operations (primarily for upcoming Symbian^3 devices). Flash Lite 3.1 was supported on S60, Flash Lite 4.0 was supported on Symbian^3 and later. Versions 7.3 (included with Symbian Anna) and 7.4 (included with Nokia Belle) added an address bar, navigation controls and other functions to an omnipresent bar for easy access.

The WebKit rendering engine was updated three times, for versions 7.0, 7.3 and 8.2. 7.3 onwards had partial HTML5 and CSS 3 support.

== Latest versions for supported devices ==
Latest version	Year	Software platform name	Devices
8.3.2	2012	Nokia Belle Feature Pack 2	All
8.3.1	2012	Nokia Belle Refresh	All
7.3	2011	S60 5th Edition	Nokia: All except Nokia N97
7.3	2011	S60 3rd Edition; Feature Pack 2	Nokia: Nokia 6700 slide, Nokia C5-00, Nokia E5-00, Nokia E52, Nokia E72
7.2	2010	S60 3rd Edition; Feature Pack 2	Nokia: Nokia X5-01, Nokia E73 Mode
7.1	2009	S60 5th Edition	Nokia: Nokia N97
7.1	2009	S60 3rd Edition; Feature Pack 2	Nokia: Nokia 5630 XpressMusic, Nokia 5730 XpressMusic, Nokia 6710 Navigator, Nokia 6720 classic, Nokia 6730 classic, Nokia E55, Nokia E75, Nokia N86 8MP

== See also ==
- Mobile browser
- Information appliance
- User agent
- Nokia Xpress
