= S60 (software platform) =

Smartphone software platform

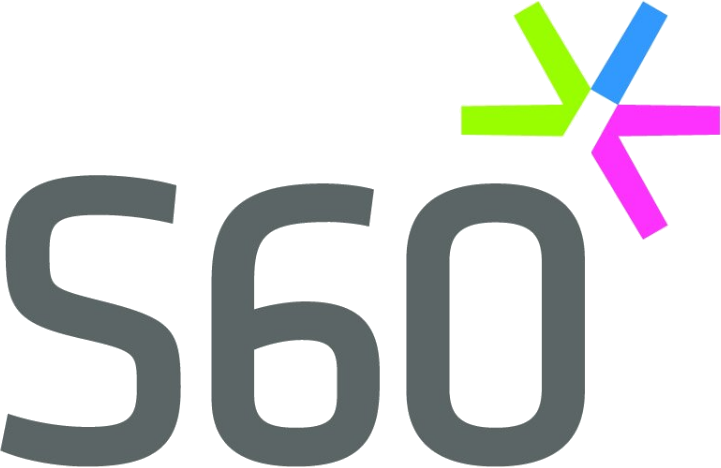
- Developer: Nokia
- Working state: Discontinued
- Marketing target: Smartphones
- Influenced by: Pearl
- Succeeded by: Symbian^3 (in name)

Support status
- Unsupported

The S60 Platform, originally named Series 60 User Interface, is a discontinued software platform and graphical user interface for smartphones that runs on top of the Symbian operating system. It was created by Nokia based on the 'Pearl' interface from Symbian Ltd. S60 was introduced at COMDEX in November 2001 and first shipped with the Nokia 7650 smartphone; the original version was followed by three other major releases.

In 2008 after Nokia bought out Symbian Ltd., the Symbian Foundation was formed to consolidate all the assets of different Symbian platforms (S60, UIQ, MOAP), making it open source. In 2009, based on the code base of S60, the first iteration of the platform since the creation of Symbian Foundation was launched as S60 5th Edition, or Symbian^1, on top of Symbian OS 9.4 as its base. Subsequent iterations dropped the S60 brand and were named solely under the Symbian name.

== Overview ==
S60 5th Edition idle screen. Bottom left "button" brings up a virtual number pad, to compensate for removal of actual numerical keys.

The S60 middleware was a multivendor standard for smartphones that supports application development in Java MIDP, C++, Python and Adobe Flash. Its API was called Avkon UI. S60 consists of a suite of libraries and standard applications, such as telephony, personal information manager (PIM) tools, and Helix-based multimedia players. It was intended to power fully featured modern phones with large colour screens, which are commonly known as smartphones.

Originally, the most distinguishing feature of S60 phones was that they allowed users to install new applications after purchase. Unlike a standard desktop platform, however, the built-in apps are rarely upgraded by the vendor beyond bug fixes. New features are only added to phones while they are being developed rather than after public release. Certain buttons are standardized, such as a menu key, a four way joystick or d-pad, left and right soft keys and a clear key.

S60 was mainly used by Nokia but they also licensed it to a few other manufacturers, including Lenovo, LG Electronics, Panasonic, Samsung, Sendo, Siemens Mobile, Sony Ericsson, Solstice and Vertu. Sony Ericsson notably was the main vendor using the competing UIQ Symbian interface.

In addition to the manufacturers the community includes:

- Software integration companies such as Sasken, Elektrobit, Teleca, Digia, Mobica, Atelier.tm
- Semiconductor companies Texas Instruments, STMicroelectronics, Broadcom, Sony, Freescale Semiconductor, Samsung Electronics
- Operators such as Vodafone and Orange who develop and provide S60-based mobile applications and services
- Software developers and independent software vendors (ISVs).

== S60 editions ==
S60 3rd Edition menu on a Nokia N73

There have been four major releases of S60: Series 60 (2001), Series 60 Second Edition (2002), S60 3rd Edition (2005) and S60 5th Edition (2008). Each release had an updated version called Feature Pack, sometimes known as relay. Each runs on top of a different Symbian OS version.

Series 60 1st Edition
The devices' display resolution was fixed to 176×208. The Siemens SX1 meanwhile had 176×220.

- Version 0.9 was the original and first shipped with Nokia 7650.
- Version 1.2 (marketed as Feature Pack 1) first shipped with Nokia 3600/3650 in 2003.

Series 60 2nd Edition
Also known as S60v2.

- Version 2 was the original and first shipped with Nokia 6600.
- Version 2.1 (Feature Pack 1) first came with Nokia 6620.
- Version 2.6 (Feature Pack 2) first came with Nokia 6630.
- Version 2.8 (Feature Pack 3) first started shipping with Nokia N70 in September 2005. FP3 now supports multiple resolutions, i.e. Basic (176×208), and Double (352×416). The N90 was the first Series 60 device to support a higher resolution (352×416).

S60 3rd Edition
S60v3 uses a hardened version of Symbian OS (v9.1), which has mandatory code signing. In S60v3, a user may install only programs that have a certificate from a registered developer, unless the user disables that feature or modify the phone's firmware through third-party hacks that circumvent the mandatory signing restrictions. This makes software written for S60 1st Edition or 2nd Edition not binary-compatible with S60v3.

- Version 3 was first introduced with Nokia 3250 in 2006.
- Version 3.1 (Feature Pack 1) first shipped with Nokia N95.
- Version 3.2 (Feature Pack 2) first shipped with Nokia N78.

In 2006, a "Designed for S60 Devices" logo program for developers was launched. The logotype can be used with conforming programs regardless of them being native Symbian or Java.

S60 5th Edition / Symbian^1
In October 2008 Symbian^1, also known as S60v5, was launched as the first OS under the Symbian Foundation, based on the S60 code so therefore also called S60 5th Edition. Nokia skipped the number 4 as they traditionally always do (due to East Asian tetraphobia). S60 5th Edition runs on Symbian OS version 9.4. The major feature of 5th Edition is support for high-resolution 640×360 touchscreens; before 5th Edition, all S60 devices had a button-based user interface. S60 5th Edition also integrates standard C/C++ APIs and includes Adobe Flash Lite 3.0 with S60-specific ActionScript extensions that give Flash Lite developers access to phone features like contacts, text messaging, sensors and device location information (GPS). : Despite the introduction of S60 5th Edition, the 3rd Edition continued to be marketed new as well, as 5th Edition is specially designed for, and exclusively available on touchscreens (e.g. Nokia C6-00, Sony Ericsson Satio).

- Version 5 was first introduced with Nokia 5800 XpressMusic in 2008.

S60 5th Edition was the last edition of S60. It was succeeded by Symbian^2 (based on MOAP) and Symbian^3 in 2010.

== Unification of Symbian interfaces ==
As an OS, Symbian OS originally provided no user interface (UI), the visual layer that runs atop an operating system: this was implemented separately. Other than S60, other examples of Symbian UIs were MOAP; Series 80; Series 90 and UIQ. This separation of UI from underlying OS created both flexibility and some confusion in the market place. The Nokia outright purchase of Symbian in June 2008 was brokered with the involvement of the other UI developers and all major user interface layers had been (or pledged to) donating to the open source foundation, Symbian Foundation, who would independently own the Symbian operating system. It announced its intent to unify different Symbian UIs into a single UI based on the S60 platform.

S60 5th Edition was the first version under the unified Symbian interface, and it was therefore also named Symbian^1. After this, the S60 name was dropped entirely with the release of Symbian^3 in 2010. In November 2010, Nokia abruptly announced that the Symbian Foundation will close down, leaving further Symbian development in question. The company had previously stated that MeeGo would become its smartphone future. In February 2011, Nokia instead announced a partnership with Microsoft to adopt Windows Phone 7 as Nokia's primary operating system, while promising continued support for Symbian and its newer devices until at least 2016. On 29 April 2011, Nokia announced that it would transfer Symbian activities to Accenture along with 3,000 employees.

=== Symbian^3 ===
Symbian^3 was announced together with Nokia N8 on 27 April 2010. The software is faster than the previous S60 5th Edition and takes better advantage of hardware capabilities to create a snappier performance. Interface wise it is not drastically different although it does have multiple home screens. The task switcher has been revamped and now show thumbnails of each open app. Web browsing experience is also improved with the addition of pinch-to-zoom. The native text messaging app now features a "conversation" interface. While the virtual keyboard is still T9, a QWERTY is offered in landscape view.

=== Symbian Anna ===
On 12 April 2011, Nokia announced Symbian Anna as a software update to the Symbian^3 release. Three new devices (500, X7 and E6) were announced which will have Symbian Anna pre-installed. The most significant changes were:

- Portrait QWERTY with split-view data entry
- New Icon Set
- New web browser with an improved user interface, search-integrated address field, faster navigation and page loading.
- Updated Ovi Maps (search public transport, download full country maps via WLAN or Nokia Ovi Suite, check-in to Facebook, Twitter and Foursquare).
- Java Runtime 2.2, Qt Mobility 1.1 and Qt4.7.

=== Nokia Belle ===
On 24 August 2011, Nokia announced Symbian Belle (later renamed Nokia Belle) as a software update to the Symbian Anna release. Three new devices (603, 700 and 701) were announced with Belle pre-installed. The most significant changes were:

- Free-form, differently-sized, live widgets
- More homescreens
- Improved status bar
- Dropdown menu
- Modernised navigation
- New apps
- Informative lock screen
- NFC devices
- Visual multitasking

Nokia Belle Feature Pack 1 and Nokia Belle Refresh integrated Microsoft Office apps.

=== Symbian Carla and Donna ===
In November 2011, Nokia announced the Carla and Donna updates. Carla was expected to be released in late 2012 or early 2013 and feature a new web browser, new widgets, new NFC capabilities and Dolby Surround audio enhancement. Donna was going to be a dual-core processor exclusive, and was planned to be released late 2013 or early 2014. However, in May 2012 a Nokia executive claimed that Carla and Donna were cancelled, and that Nokia would instead only release Belle Feature Pack 2 later in 2012, lacking many of the new features that were planned for Carla and Donna.

== Version history and supported devices ==
Many devices are capable of running the S60 software platform with the Symbian OS. Devices ranging from the early Nokia 7650 running S60 v0.9 on Symbian OS v6.1, to the latest Samsung i8910 Omnia HD running S60 v5.0 on Symbian OS v9.4. In Symbian^3 the version of the revised platform is v5.2.

The table lists devices carrying each version of S60 as well as the Symbian OS version on what it is based. Devices since Symbian^3 may be capable of upgrading to newer versions.

Product Name	S60 Version Number	Symbian OS Version Number	Devices
Series 60 1st Edition	0.9	6.1	Nokia 7650
Series 60 1st Edition, Feature Pack 1	1.2	6.1	Nokia: Nokia 3600, Nokia 3620, Nokia 3650, Nokia 3660, Nokia N-Gage, Nokia N-Gage QD; Sendo: Sendo X, Sendo X2 (canceled); Siemens: Siemens SX1; Samsung: Samsung SGH-D700 (canceled), Samsung SGH-D710 (canceled)
Series 60 2nd Edition	2.0	7.0s	Nokia: Nokia 6600; Panasonic: Panasonic X700, Panasonic X800; Samsung: Samsung SGH-D720, Samsung SGH-D728, Samsung SGH-D730, Samsung SGH-Z600 (canceled)
Series 60 2nd Edition, Feature Pack 1	2.1	7.0s	Nokia: Nokia 3230, Nokia 6260, Nokia 6620, Nokia 6670, Nokia 7610
Series 60 2nd Edition, Feature Pack 2	2.6	8.0a	Lenovo: Lenovo P930; Nokia: Nokia 6630, Nokia 6680, Nokia 6681, Nokia 6682
Series 60 2nd Edition, Feature Pack 3	2.8	8.1a	Nokia: Nokia N70, Nokia N72, Nokia N90
S60 3rd Edition	3.0	9.1	Nokia: Nokia 3250, Nokia 5500 Sport, Nokia E50, Nokia E60, Nokia E61, Nokia E61i, Nokia E62, Nokia E65, Nokia E70, Nokia N71, Nokia N73, Nokia N75, Nokia N77, Nokia N80, Nokia N91, Nokia N91 8GB, Nokia N92, Nokia N93, Nokia N93i; Samsung: Samsung SGH-i570
S60 3rd Edition, Feature Pack 1	3.1	9.2	LG: LG KS10, LG KT610, LG KT615; Nokia: Nokia 5700 XpressMusic, Nokia 6110 Navigator, Nokia 6120 Classic, Nokia 6121 Classic, Nokia 6124 classic, Nokia 6290, Nokia E51, Nokia E63, Nokia E66, Nokia E71, Nokia E90 Communicator, Nokia N76, Nokia N81, Nokia N81 8GB, Nokia N82, Nokia N95, Nokia N95 8GB; Samsung: Samsung SGH-G810, Samsung SGH-i400, Samsung SGH-i408, Samsung SGH-i450, Samsung SGH-i458, Samsung SGH-i520, Samsung SGH-i550, Samsung SGH-i550w, Samsung SGH-i560, Samsung SGH-i568
S60 3rd Edition, Feature Pack 2	3.2	9.3	Nokia: Nokia 5320 XpressMusic, Nokia 5630 XpressMusic, Nokia 5730 XpressMusic, Nokia 6210 Navigator, Nokia 6220 classic, Nokia 6650 fold, Nokia 6710 Navigator, Nokia 6720 classic, Nokia 6730 classic, Nokia 6700 slide, Nokia 6760 slide, Nokia 6788, Nokia 6788i, Nokia 6790 slide, Nokia 6790 Surge, Nokia C5-00, Nokia C5-00 5MP, Nokia C5-01, Nokia E5-00, Nokia E52, Nokia E55, Nokia E71x, Nokia E72, Nokia E73 Mode, Nokia E75, Nokia N78, Nokia N79, Nokia N85, Nokia N86 8MP, Nokia N96, Nokia X5-00, Nokia X5-01; Samsung: Samsung GT-i8510 (INNOV8), Samsung GT-i7110, Samsung SGH-L870; Vertu: Vertu Constellation Quest
S60 5th Edition (Corresponds to Symbian^1)	5.0	9.4	Nokia: Nokia 5230, Nokia 5230 Nuron, Nokia 5233, Nokia 5235 Ovi Music Unlimited, Nokia 5250, Nokia 5530 XpressMusic, Nokia 5800 XpressMusic, Nokia 5800 Navigation Edition, Nokia C5-03, Nokia C5-04, Nokia C5-05, Nokia C5-06, Nokia C6-00, Nokia N97, Nokia N97 mini, Nokia X6-00; Samsung: Samsung i8910 Omnia HD; Sony Ericsson: Sony Ericsson Satio, Sony Ericsson Vivaz, Sony Ericsson Vivaz Pro
Symbian^2			Fujitsu: DoCoMo F-07B, DoCoMo F-08B, DoCoMo F-06B; Sharp: DoCoMo SH-07B
Symbian^3	5.2	9.5	Original firmware: Nokia: Nokia N8-00, Nokia E7-00, Nokia C7-00, Nokia C6-01, Nokia C7 Astound
Symbian Anna	5.2	9.5	Original firmware: Nokia: Nokia E6-00, Nokia X7-00, Nokia Oro, Nokia T7-00, Nokia 702T, Nokia 500, Nokia 801T; Vertu: Vertu Constellation T Updated firmware; Nokia: Nokia N8-00, Nokia E7-00, Nokia C7-00, Nokia C6-01 Latest firmware; Nokia: Nokia C7 Astound
Nokia Belle (renamed from Symbian Belle)	5.3	10.1	Nokia: Nokia 600 (canceled) Original firmware; Nokia: Nokia 700, Nokia 701, Nokia 603 Latest firmware; Nokia: Nokia N8-00, Nokia E7-00, Nokia C7-00, Nokia C6-01, Nokia X7-00, Nokia E6-00, Nokia 500, Nokia Oro; Vertu: Vertu Constellation T
Nokia Belle, Feature Pack 1	5.4	10.1	Original firmware: Nokia: Nokia 808 PureView Updated firmware; Nokia: Nokia 700, Nokia 701, Nokia 603
Nokia Belle, Feature Pack 2	5.5	10.1	Latest firmware: Nokia 808 PureView, Nokia 700, Nokia 701, Nokia 603

== See also ==
- Series 20
- Series 30
- Series 30+
- Sailfish OS, the open source Linux platform based on MeeGo from Jolla, the company which was established by ex-Nokia employees.
- Android, a partly open-source mobile platform by Google
- Maemo, Nokia's Debian Linux-based platform
- MOAP, another Symbian-based platform
- Series 40, Nokia's non-Symbian-based platform for mass-market devices.
- Series 80
- Series 90
- UIQ, another Symbian-based platform
- Web Browser for S60
- Binary Runtime Environment for Wireless
- Windows Phone and Windows 10 Mobile, two closed-source mobile platforms by Microsoft, which was mainly uses in Nokia Lumia series.
- KaiOS, a closed-source mobile platform by KaiOS Technologies that mainly uses in HMD Global's devices.
