= Nokia E5-00 =

Mobile phone made by Nokia Corporation

Nokia E5
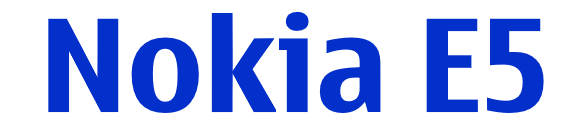

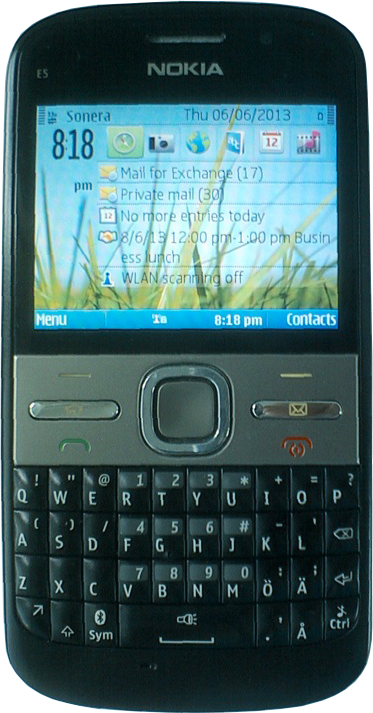
- Manufacturer: Nokia
- Type: Candybar smartphone
- Availability by region: August 2010
- Predecessor: Nokia E63; Nokia E55
- Successor: Nokia 700
- Related: Nokia C3-00; Nokia E6 (high end successor of the Nokia E72)
- Compatible networks: GSM 800 / 900 / 1800 / 1900 MHz; Tri Band UMTS / HSDPA / HSUPA / 850 / 1900 / 2100 MHz (North American Version)
- Form factor: Bar
- Dimensions: 115×58.9×12.8 mm (4.53×2.32×0.50 in)
- Weight: 126 g (4 oz) (with battery)
- Operating system: S60 3rd Edition Feature Pack 2 UI on Symbian OS v9.3
- CPU: 600 MHz ARM11 processor
- Memory: ROM (NAND) 512 MB; SDRAM 256MB
- Removable storage: MicroSDHC support for up to 32GB, 2GB included inbox
- Battery: BL-4D, 3.7V 1,200 mAh lithium-polymer
- Rear camera: 5 megapixel (2592 × 1944 pixels) with full focus and LED flash, VGA video capture at 15 FPS
- Display: transmissive LCD technology 320 × 240 px, 2.36 in, up to 256,000 colours
- Connectivity: WLAN Wi-Fi 802.11 b,g, Integrated & Assisted GPS, Bluetooth 2.0 + EDR, microUSB, 3.5 mm audio jack
- Data inputs: QWERTY thumb keyboard, five-way navigation key
- Other: FOTA (Firmware update Over The Air); Ambient Light Sensor

The Nokia E5-00 (also known as the Nokia E5) is a Symbian mobile phone. Like all smartphones in the Nokia Eseries it comes with business software applications, including QuickOffice (Office document editor). It was released in the third quarter of 2010. It comes in a candybar form factor with QWERTY keyboard. As a budget smartphone, it replaces the Nokia E63 and positioned between the Nokia X5 and the Nokia E6.

== Features ==
The E5-00 is very similar to the E72. It has more DRAM memory than the E72 but also has some important cost reductions. One cost reduction is the technology of the LCDs screen. The E5-00 has a transmissive LCD while the E72 has a transflective LCD. E5 supports only 256k display colors. Other important cost reductions are the removal of the secondary camera, the accelerometer and the digital compass. The third is the "full focus" for the camera that extends the depth of field without narrowing the aperture, instead of autofocus.

The E5-00 has a smaller battery (1200 mAh) than both the E63 and the E72 (1500 mAh) but has the talk-time of 8 hours and stand by time over 10 days.

It also features a GPS, both integrated and assisted, and runs Nokia Maps 3.0 and Ovi maps. Nokia E5 supports Mail for Exchange and IBM Lotus Notes Traveler for corporate emails. E5 supports HD Voice.

== Messaging ==
The Nokia E5-00 features IM (instant messenger), allowing access to several chat services or communities simultaneously. These include Yahoo! Messenger, Google Talk, Skype, WeChat, WhatsApp and Windows Live Messenger.

== Reception ==
Reception of the E5 has generally been positive, CNET UK praised the quality of the full qwerty keyboard, but criticized the performance of the 320 × 240 pixel LCD, quoting it as "virtually impossible to see in direct sunlight". Softpedia in contrast stated that the LCD worked perfectly in sunlight.

Softpedia wrote that the E5-00 is "an all-rounder as it performs decent in all areas", though they also stated that the camera is not a very strong point.
