= Nokia N97 =

Smartphone from Nokia released in 2009

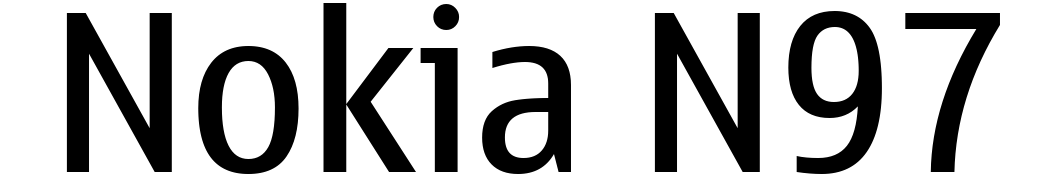

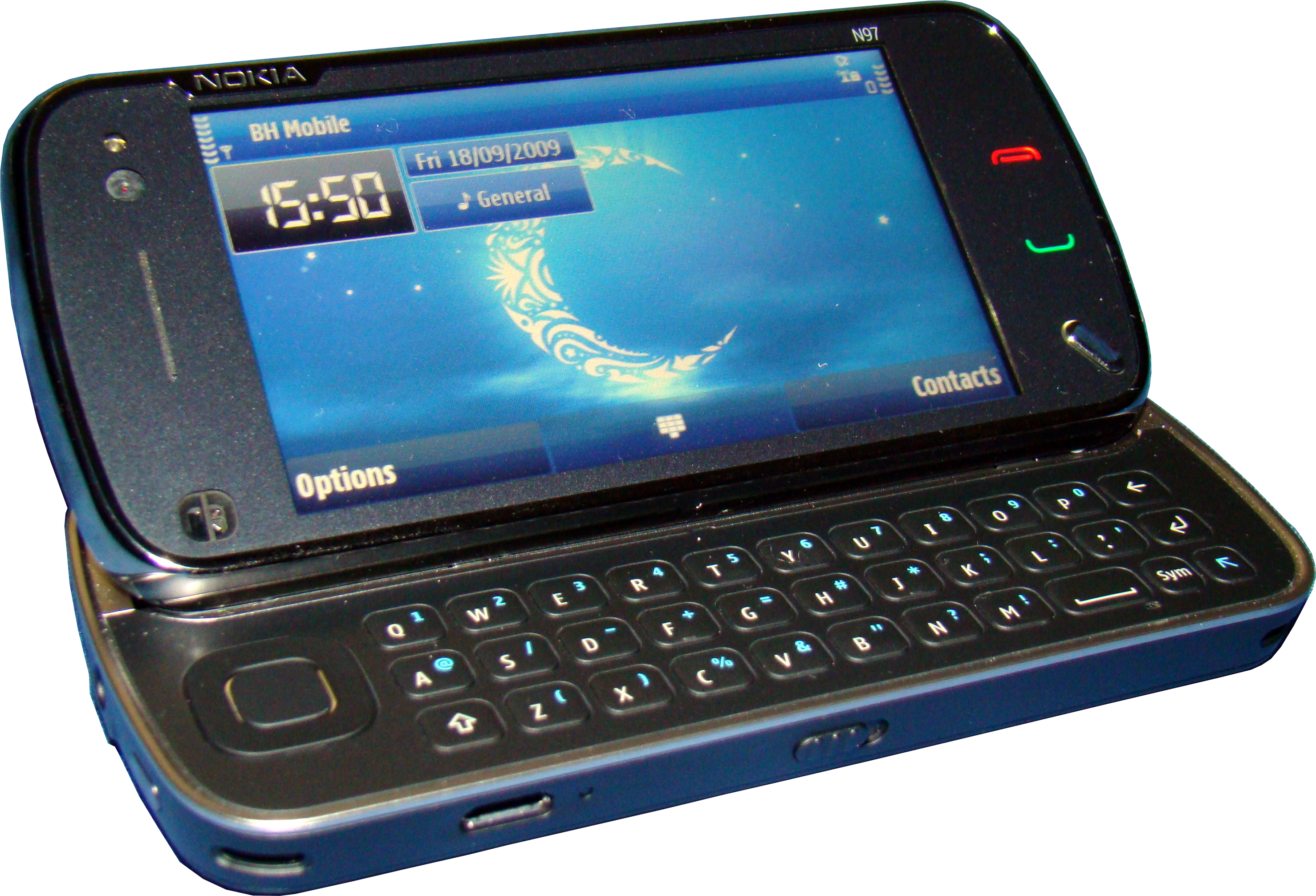
- A Nokia N97 revealing its slide-out landscape keyboard
- Manufacturer: Nokia
- Series: Nseries
- Availability by region: 2 June 2009 (United States)
- Discontinued: October 2010
- Predecessor: Nokia N96; Nokia N79 (for N97 Mini); Nokia 8600 Luna; Nokia E90 Communicator
- Successor: Nokia N8; Nokia C6-00 (for N97 Mini); Nokia N900; Nokia E7-00; Nokia 808 PureView; Nokia Lumia 920/1020
- Related: Nokia N86 8MP; Nokia N79
- Compatible networks: HSDPA (3.5G), Quad band GSM / GPRS / EDGE GSM 850, GSM 900, GSM 1800, GSM 1900
- Form factor: Tilt slider
- Dimensions: 117.2 × 55.3 × 15.9* mm *18.25 mm at camera area for original (113 x 52.5 x 14.2 mm for mini)
- Weight: 150 g (5 oz) for original (138 g for mini)
- Operating system: Symbian 9.4 with Nokia S60 Fifth Edition UI. Current firmware 22.0.110 (RM-505) / 22.1.112 (RM-506) / 22.2.110 (RM-507) / 12.0.110 (N97 mini)
- CPU: Single CPU, 434 MHz ARM11
- Memory: 128 MB SDRAM
- Storage: 32 GB on-board (about 29.8 GB user available) for original, (8 GB for mini)
- Removable storage: microSD 16 GB max (16 GB Max MicroSDHC available in 2009)
- Battery: BP-4L (1500 mAh, Li-polymer) for original, (BL-4D 3.7 V 1200 mAh for mini)
- Rear camera: 5.0 megapixels f/2.8 Carl Zeiss Tessar lens
- Display: 640×360 px (16:9 aspect ratio), 3.5 in for original (3.2 in for mini), sliding tilt TFT LCD, up to 16.7 million colours
- Connectivity: WLAN 802.11b/g, USB 2.0, Bluetooth 2.0, TV-out (PAL/NTSC), FM transmitter only for original
- Data inputs: QWERTY keyboard, resistive touchscreen, proximity and ambient light sensors, accelerometer, digital compass
- Hearing aid compatibility: M3

The Nokia N97 is a high-end smartphone introduced on 2 December 2008 by Nokia as part of its Nseries and released in June 2009 as the company's flagship device. The N97 was Nokia's second S60-based touchscreen phone, after the Nokia 5800 XpressMusic. The device features slide-out QWERTY keyboard, and runs on the Symbian v9.4 (Symbian^1/S60 5th Edition) operating system. Its design takes cues from the Nokia N79. A smaller and lower-cost variant, the Nokia N97 mini, was later released.

As the successor to the Nokia N96, the Nokia N97 heralded the company's Nseries "multimedia computers" into the touchscreen era. The N97 was highly anticipated and, despite respectable sales, in industry circles the phone was considered a hardware and software "disaster" that contributed to Nokia's decline. In 2010, a Nokia executive called the N97 a "regrettable failure". The N97 was followed as the Nseries flagship by the Nokia N8 over a year later, while the Nokia E7 released in 2011 was a continuation of the Nokia N97's form factor.

== Release ==
The Nokia N97 was released in US flagship stores on 9 June 2009, and worldwide on 26 June 2009. In September 2009, it was reported that some two million N97 handsets had been sold in the three months after its release.

The N97 shipped with trial versions of Quick Office, Adobe Reader, Boingo, Joikuspot, Ovi Maps, and Ovi store software applications.

The device's initial software met a mixed reception, prompting the release of new firmware in October 2009. Nokia released the new firmware with kinetic scrolling for the N97 to address drawbacks in the initial firmware release.

In October 2009, the N97 Mini, a smaller version of the original N97, was introduced. The N97 Mini was regarded as an improvement over the original N97.

== Operating times ==
Informal tests found that the N97's battery could hold a charge through nearly two days of the original N97's regular use. Nokia claimed the following operating times:

- Talk time: Up to 6.0 hours (3G), 9.5 hours (GSM)
- Standby time: Up to 17 days (3G), 18 days (GSM)
- Video playback: Up to 4.5 hours (offline mode)
- Video recording: Up to 3.6 hours (offline mode)
- Music playback: Up to 40 hours (offline mode)

== Special applications ==
With the optional DVB-H Nokia Mobile TV receiver, SU-33W it became possible to watch television on the phone. This was compatible with Nokia's N-Gage platform, the only touchscreen with this capability at the time.

== Reception ==
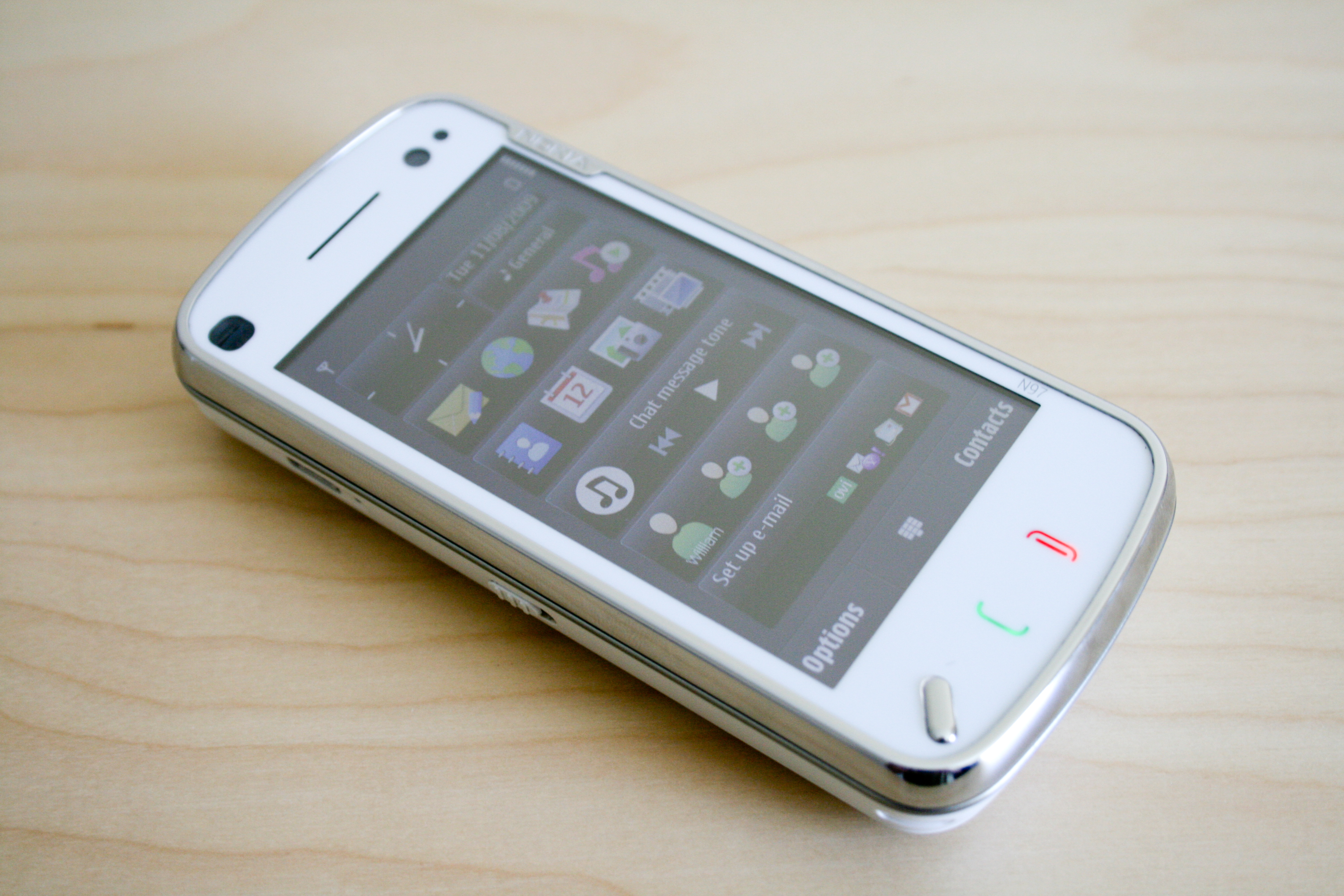
The N97

The Nokia N97 was met with widely negative reviews upon release. Criticism of the original N97 included its relative lack of RAM and available storage. With only 50MB of free RAM after boot, the phone could become sluggish and close applications to conserve memory. Many first-party applications would install only on the root partition and with around 50MB of free space, this was used quickly in competition with the needs of temporary OS files. The N97 Mini resolved this issue, often offering users over 250MB of free space in fixed storage. A memory mapping change from firmware version 20 enabled applications to use less RAM and to better disengage, which eased the strain of less free RAM to the end-user.

Anssi Vanjoki, Nokia's EVP of Markets admitted that quality control of the device's software was troublesome, saying "it has been a tremendous disappointment in terms of the experience quality for the consumers", though Vanjoki later claimed that the issue could be repaired by firmware updates.

Steve Litchfield of "All About Symbian" wrote in a 2011 blog post: "The N97 really was the device that should have ruled the world - it had, almost literally, everything. And yet it became the one device that Nokia had to (literally) apologize for, publicly. The one device that became a millstone around its neck."

Nokia acknowledged that on many units the covers and lenses were mounted too closely, resulting in scratches from dust and debris. On later units, Nokia reportedly fixed this issue.

Other early adopters of the N97 encountered speed problems with the phone's built-in GPS lock. The phones lost track of their current locations, making Nokia's free turn-by-turn navigation software unusable. Users were offered under-warranty repairs for lens cover and GPS issues at official Nokia service centers.

Although Nokia phones traditionally had provided strong signal reception, the Nokia N97 fell short in this area, demonstrating poor signal strength, even when compared side by side to other phones connected to the same network.

The user interface of the S60 5th edition software platform, built on top of Symbian OS 9.4, was criticized by the TechRadar site as inconsistent, insofar as menu items required two taps to activate. In 2010, Nokia apologized to customers who had experienced shortcomings with the N97 and its software.

Despite its generally poor reception, the phone sold well. However, its marketing as an "iPhone killer" tarnished Nokia's smartphone reputation at the time.

== Nokia N97 Mini ==
The N97 Mini was a downsized version of the N97 introduced in October 2009. The N97 Mini reduced some features of the original N97, such as 8 GB of storage memory, 3.2-inch (81 mm) touchscreen, and a shorter battery life. It used the 2.0 Nokia N97 software by default. The keypad was somewhat redesigned. The big D-pad on the left side was replaced by four arrow keys on the right side. There also was more space between each key, and keys were a bit higher, which offered better tactile sense when typing.

This table lists significant differences.

	Original N97	N97 mini
Device Size	117.2 mm × 55.3 mm × 15.9 mm 4.61 in × 2.18 in × 0.63 in	113 mm × 52.5 mm × 14.2 mm 4.45 in × 2.07 in × 0.56 in
Volume	88 cc (5.4 cu in)	75 cc (4.6 cu in)
Weight	150 g (5.3 oz)	138 g (4.9 oz)
LCD size (640×360 px)	3.5 inches (89 mm)	3.2 inches (81 mm)
inbuilt mass Storage Memory	32 GB	8 GB
NAND Memory	256 MB (approx. 73 MB user available)	512 MB (approx. 277 MB user available)
FM transmitter	Available	Not available
Battery model	BP-4L 3.7 V 1500 mAh	BL-4D 3.7 V 1200 mAh
GSM Talk Time up to	9.5 hours	7.1 hours
WCDMA Talk Time up to	6.0 hours	4.0 hours
GSM Standby Time up to	18 days	13 days
WCDMA Standby Time up to	17 days	13 days
Web Browser for S60 version after firmware update	7.1	7.3

A limited edition, the "N97 mini Raoul Limited Edition" was released in collaboration with fashion house FJ Benjamin and the Raoul brand. It also featured a Fashion Asia widget and became available in late October 2009 in Malaysia and Singapore.

=== Reception ===
The user interface of the S60 5th edition software platform, built on top of Symbian OS 9.4, was criticized by the TechRadar site as being inconsistent, insofar as menu items required two taps to be activated.

When compared to the original N97, the cheaper N97 mini was regarded in reviews as an improvement, especially its keyboard.

== Successor ==
There are three phones considered as successors to the N97. Firstly is the N8, as it became the new multimedia flagship for 2010. Also is the C6, which had a similar sliding-out QWERTY keyboard - however, since the C6 uses the same specifications, the Maemo-powered N900, also featuring the keyboard, yet considerably better specifications have been considered the successor.

== See also ==
- BlackBerry Storm
- Daxian N97
- HTC Touch Pro2
- HTC Hero
- iPhone 3GS
- Nokia 5800 XpressMusic
- Nokia C6-00
- Nokia E7
- Nokia N900
- Palm Pre
- Samsung i8910 Omnia HD
- Sony Ericsson Satio
