= Nokia 6120 classic =

Mobile phone model

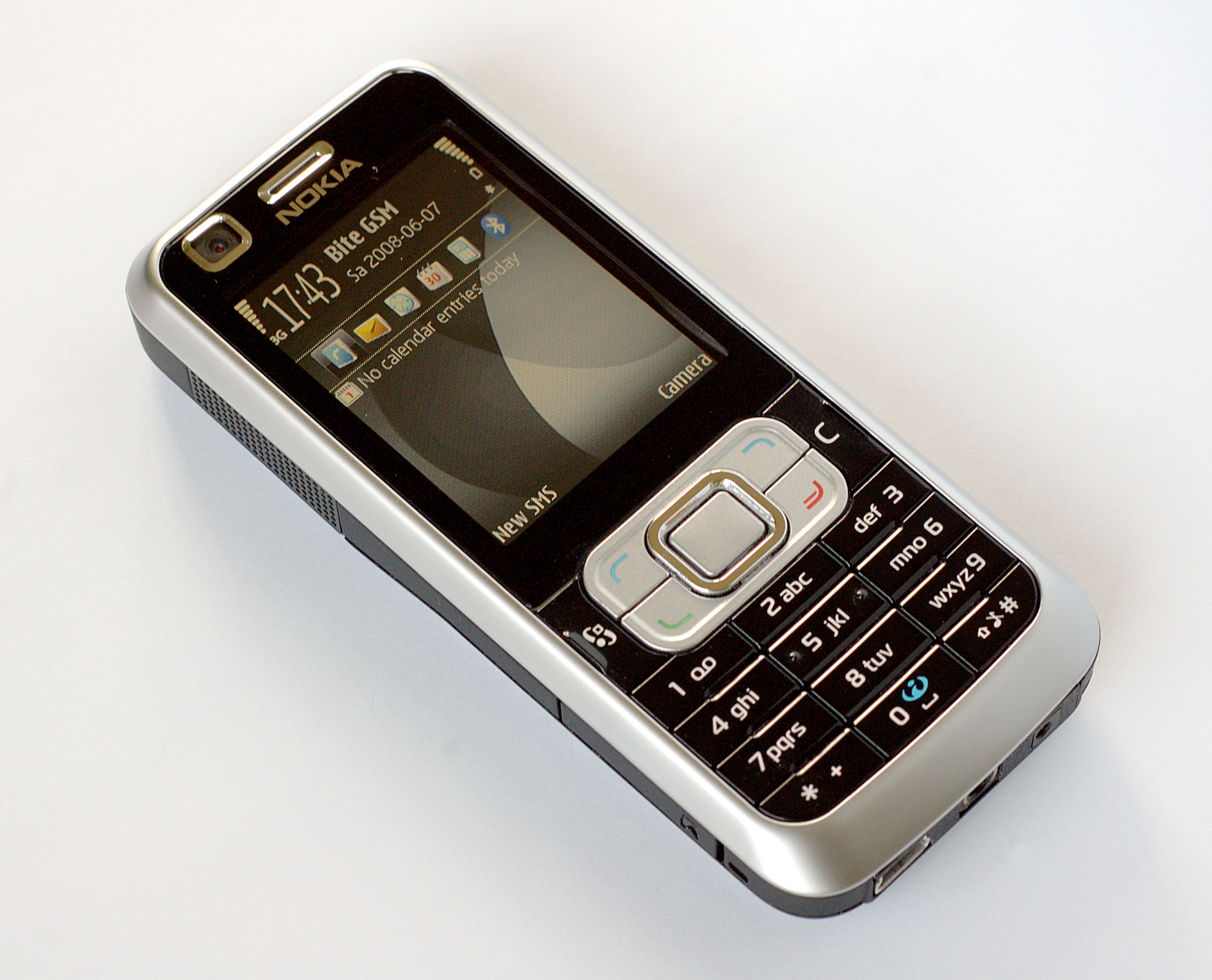
- Manufacturer: Nokia
- First released: 17 March 2007
- Availability by region: April 2007
- Predecessor: Nokia 3230; Nokia 6233
- Successor: Nokia 6220 Classic
- Related: Nokia 6110 Navigator
- Compatible networks: Quad-band GSM, Dual-band UMTS/HSDPA in 850/2100 and 900/2100 configurations
- Form factor: Candybar
- Dimensions: 105 mm × 46 mm × 15 mm (4.13 in × 1.81 in × 0.59 in)
- Weight: 89 g (3.1 oz)
- Operating system: Symbian OS 9.2 + S60 platform 3rd Edition, Feature Pack 1
- CPU: ARM 11 @ 369 MHz
- Memory: 64 MB (RAM), 128 MB NAND (35 MB free)
- Removable storage: microSD (SDHC) (16 GB max)
- Battery: BL-5B Battery Li-ion 3.7V 890 mAh
- Rear camera: 2-megapixel with LED flash plus Video recording and Panoramic options
- Front camera: 240 x 320 pixels (QVGA resolution)
- Display: TFT, 2 inches, 320 x 240 pixels, 16 million colors
- Connectivity: USB Mass Storage via mini USB, Bluetooth 2.0 with A2DP profile
- Data inputs: Keypad
- SAR: 1.19 W/kg (max permitted 2.0 Watts/Kilogram)

The Nokia 6120 classic is a mid-range mobile phone from Nokia that was announced on 17 March 2007. It runs on Symbian v9.2 with a S60 3rd Edition FP1 user interface. It was the second Nokia handset, after 3110 classic, to use the 'classic' suffix, consisting of balanced, mid-range candybar phones in the 6xxx and 3xxx numbered lines.

It is the first Nokia UMTS / HSDPA dual band phone which also features quad band GSM, supporting both 2G and 3G/UMTS networks. Despite its small and sleek size in a classic candybar form, it still retained standard S60 features and also has HSDPA (3.5G), the fourth from Nokia to do so after the N95, E90 and 6110 Navigator. It weighs only 89 grams.

== Features ==
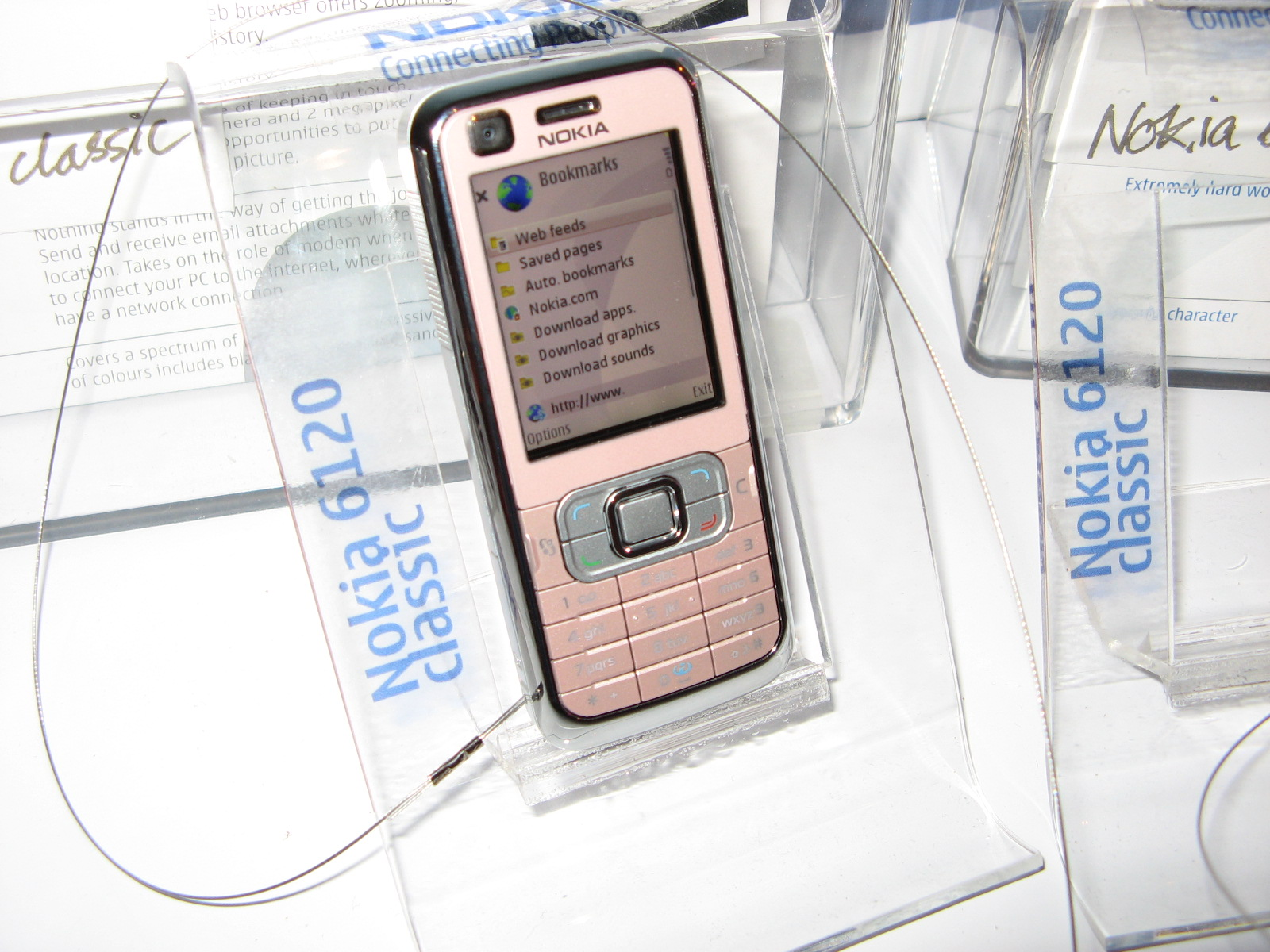
A 6120 classic on display

The American 6120 classic has UMTS 850/2100 MHz with HSDPA while the 6121 classic has UMTS 900/2100 MHz with HSDPA. Both models support quad band GSM. On a network supporting HSDPA 3 Mbit/s download rate is possible on this phone. The NM705i has FOMA 800/850 MHz, 2 GHz connectivity.

All models feature a secondary front mounted camera for video phone calls. The resolution of the camera is only 320x240, since the video calls are only shown on other handsets screens. The front camera can also be used to take self-portraits. The regular camera is a 2-megapixel camera with 4x digital zoom, but no autofocus.

Nokia has begun to move away from the traditional proprietary Pop-Port. The phone features a standard Mini USB connector which does not charge the battery. When a USB cable is connected, the phone asks what type of connection it should make, with the choice of media player, PC-suite or Data transfer. The data transfer mode allows the phone to function as a mass storage device making a card reader (to access the phone's microSD card) unnecessary.

The base of the phone also features a 4-part 2.5 mm socket for the supplied headset. When the supplied 4-part 2.5 mm headset is plugged in, it can function as an antenna for the stereo FM radio that also has support for Visual Radio.

It is possible to connect a 3-part 2.5 mm to 3.5 mm adapter to use with standard headphones, however as normal headphones do not have a microphone, this feature may be best suited for media viewing/listening only. The audio player supports MP3, M4A, eAAC+ and WMA formats. iTunes protected audio is not compatible, however iTunes Plus music can be played on the phone.

The phone is capable of Video recording-QVGA with the resolution of 320x240 @15fps the front camera can also be used but only with a resolution of 176x144.

For video playback the phone has H.264/MPEG-4 AVC, H.263, RealVideo 7,8,9,10 support.

The phone has the Java ME environment: MIDP 2.0, CLDC 1.1 installed. The NM705i has Java turned off as Java applications are replaced by i-mode software components.

=== Interface changes ===
The 6120 classic user interface lacks the typical 3D animated menu items as well as some built-in software, such as the Stopwatch; third party programs can be installed to regain similar functionality.

== Variants ==
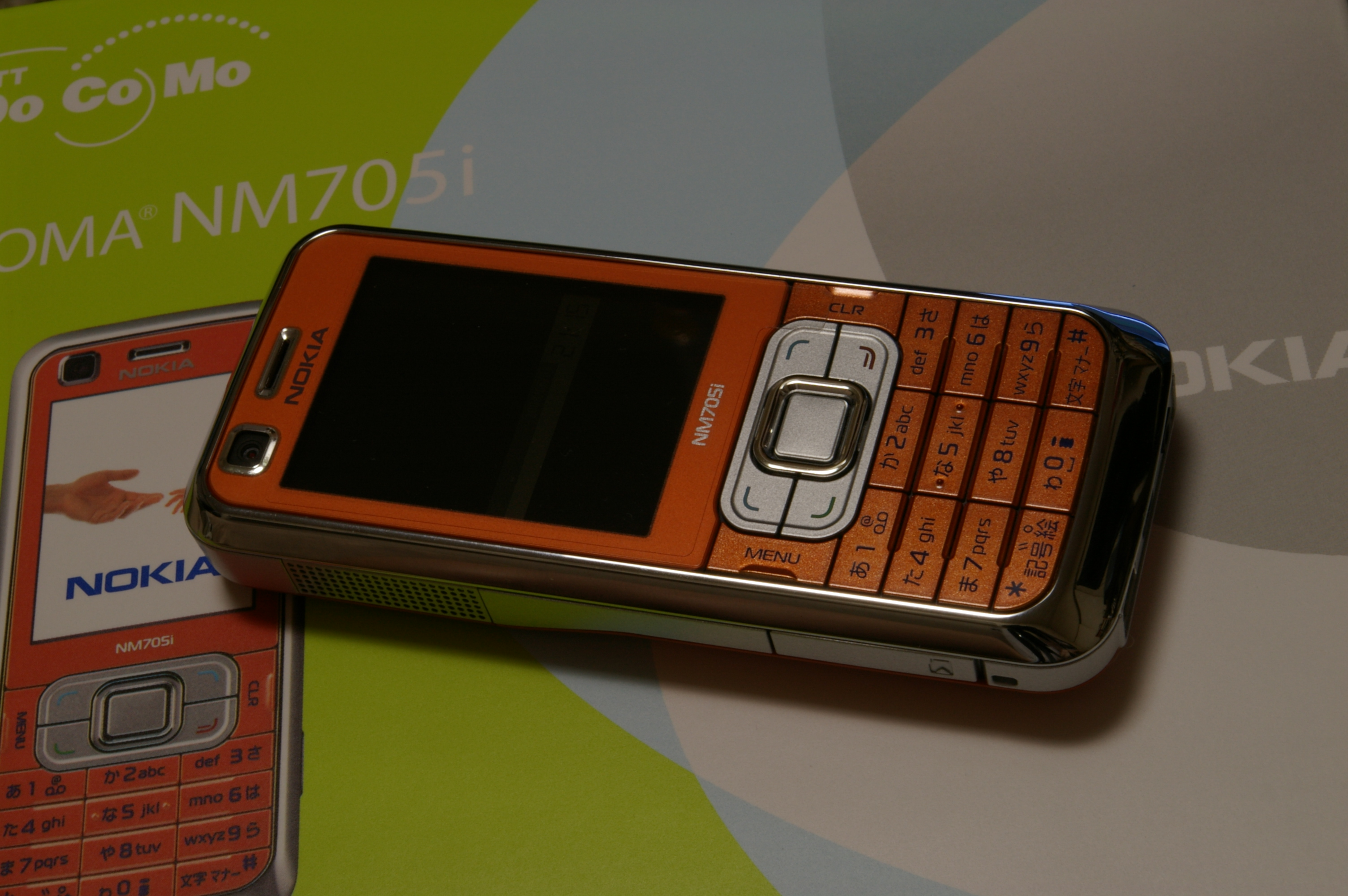
NM705i

=== Nokia 6121 classic ===
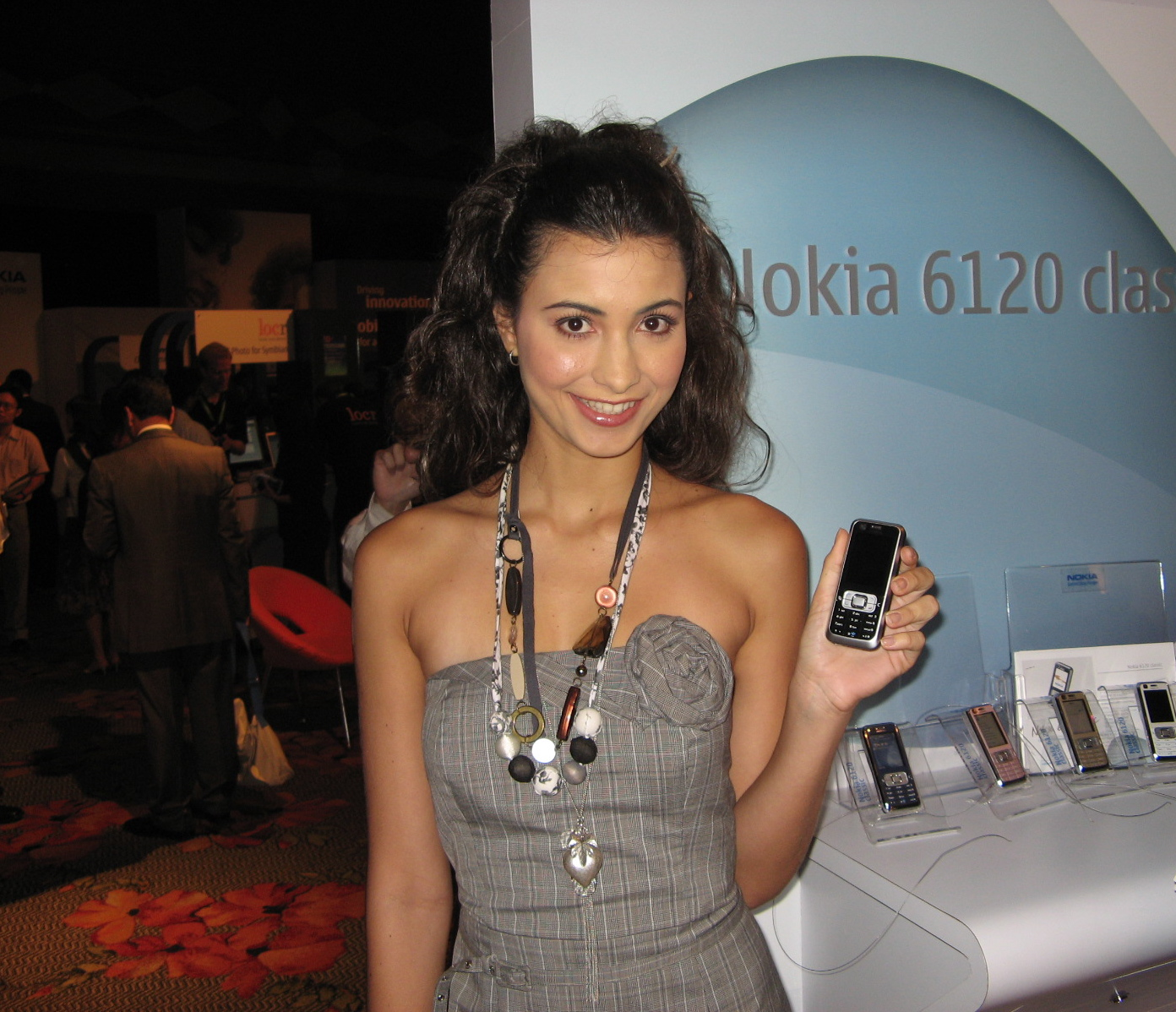
A model posing with a 6120 classic

Nokia 6121 classic is the first UMTS900 device on the market. It is available in five colours: Black, Blue, White, Gold and Pink. The 6120 classic and 6121 classic are identical, the only difference is that they have a different set of 3G frequencies.

=== Nokia 6122 classic ===
Nokia 6122 classic had a modified shell. The 6120 classic and 6122 classic are identical on the inside.

=== Nokia 6124 classic ===
The Nokia 6124 is a Vodafone variant of the Nokia 6120 classic. Shape design is even rounder than 6120, and different function key arrangement.

=== NM705i/706i ===
The FOMA NM705i is the NTT DoCoMo version of the 6120 classic released on March 19, 2008. The phone lacks the ability to install native applications, and also lacks HSDPA and an email client. NM705i has i-mode software (i-mode browser, i-mode mail, i-appli) instead of MIDP applications, MMS, and the Nokia web browser. Available colors are Black, White, and Orange (NM705i original).

Later, August of same year, introduced FOMA NM706i carries a same exterior design as the 6124 classic and NM705i specifications. Available Black color is same as NM705i, but Red and Silver color is newly available instead of Orange and White.
