= Nokia E6 =

Symbian smartphone

Nokia E6-00
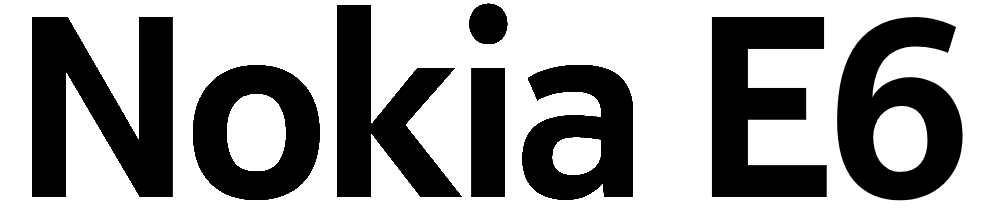

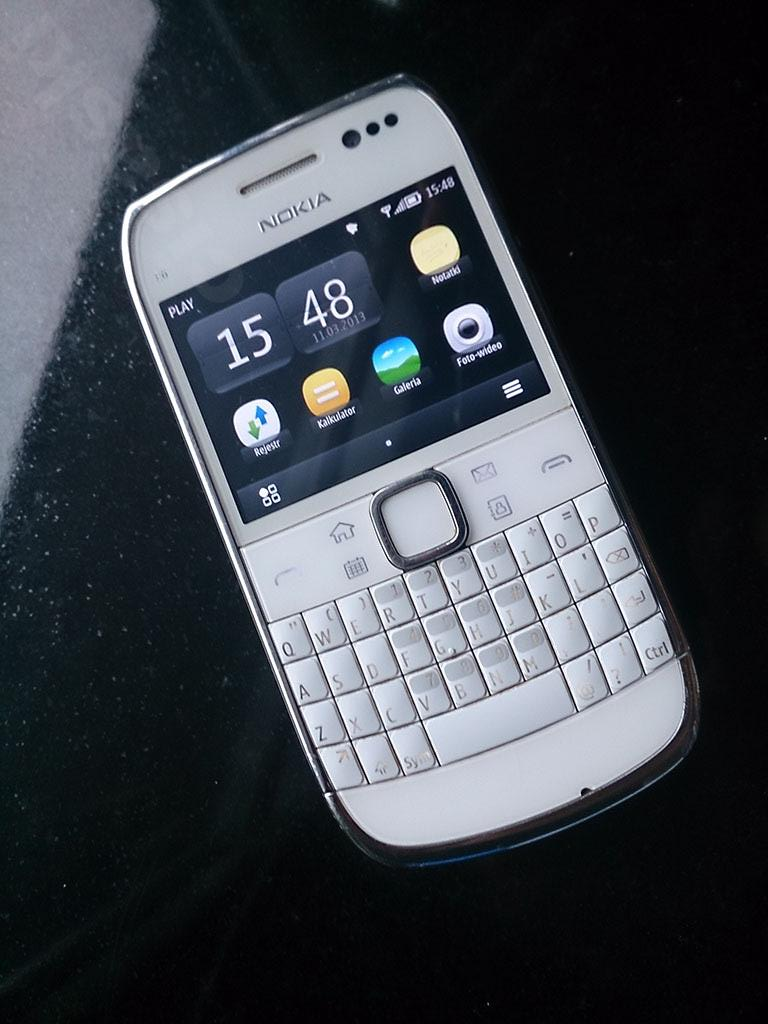
- Manufacturer: Nokia
- Series: Eseries
- Availability by region: May 2011, World wide (except Canada, USA, Korea and Japan)
- Predecessor: Nokia E72
- Related: Nokia E7-00; Nokia X7-00
- Compatible networks: GSM 850 / 900 / 1800 / 1900; GPRS/EDGE class B, multislot class 33; UMTS 850 / 900 / 1700 / 1900 / 2100; HSDPA Cat9, up to 10.2 Mbps; HSUPA Cat5, up to 2.0 Mbps
- Form factor: Candybar
- Dimensions: Width: 59 mm; Height: 115.5 mm; Thickness: 10.5 mm (11.7 mm around the camera area)
- Weight: 133 g (5 oz)
- Operating system: Symbian Anna, upgradeable to Nokia Belle Refresh (111.140.0058)
- CPU: ARM11 680 MHz; 3D Graphics Broadcom BCM2727 GPU with HW Accelerator supporting OpenGL-ES 2.0 and OpenVG1.1
- Memory: 256 MB Mobile DDR
- Storage: 1024 MB internal NAND memory (350 MB available to user); 8 GB on-board memory
- Removable storage: Hot swap microSD/microSDHC card up to 32 GB supported
- Battery: User replaceable BP-4L 3.7V 1500 mAh Li-Ion battery; micro USB charging; 2mm charging connector
- Rear camera: 8 MP (CMOS sensor) with EDoF, camera resolution of 3264px × 2448px, 720p at 25 frame/s or 640 × 480 at 30 frame/s, Digital zoom 2X for camera and 3X for video, Focus range : 50 cm to infinity
- Front camera: 0.3 MP (CMOS sensor), 176 × 144 at 15 frame/s for video calling
- Display: Transmissive LCD 640 × 480 px (VGA), 16.7 million colors (24 bits), 62.5 mm diagonally
- Connectivity: WLAN IEEE 802.11 b/g/n (2.4 GHz); Bluetooth 3.0; Bluetooth Stereo Audio; micro USB 2.0; USB On-the-Go 1.3; USB 2.0 High-Speed; USB Mass Storage; MTP (Multimedia Transfer Protocol); GPS and A-GPS; Stereo FM radio with RDS (87.5-108 MHz or 76-90 MHz); 3.5 mm AV connector (TV out, audio in/out)
- Development status: Released in Q2 2011

The Nokia E6-00 is a smartphone running the Symbian^3 operating system, part of the Nokia Eseries. It supersedes the Nokia E72 as the mid-range Symbian business device from Nokia following its announcement on 12 April 2011 (same day as Nokia X7-00). It shipped with the new "Symbian Anna" version of Symbian^3, and originally retailed for 340 euros before taxes.

The smartphone is notable for its backlit 4-rows QWERTY keyboard and touch screen input methods, for its long battery life (Talktime : 7.5 to 14.8 h and Standby : 28 to 31 days), the out-of-the-box access to Microsoft Exchange ActiveSync, Microsoft Communicator Mobile and Microsoft SharePoint and the high pixel density of its VGA display (326ppi).

Like its predecessors (Nokia E71/E72), the Nokia E6-00 integrates a stainless steel and glass design. The back removable cover, the raised panel for the back camera, dual LED flash and loud speaker and the contour of the front are made of stainless steel. The front of the phone (except for the QWERTY keyboard, short cut buttons and Navikey) is covered with Corning Gorilla Glass. Its casing has three color options (black, silver and white).

The E6 would also be the last Symbian-based device with a QWERTY keyboard, as the later QWERTY devices would be Series 40 from the Asha line. The Nokia Asha 302 from 2012 bears strong design similarities to the E6.

In October 2012, Vertu released the Constellation Quest Blue, based on the E6.

== History and availability ==
The predecessor of the E6-00 in the Eseries, consisting of business-oriented smartphones, was the Nokia E72 which shipped in November 2009. As with the E71, the E72 received mostly praises from the press. It is worth noting that Nokia released the E7, a landscape QWERTY slider smartphone in the Eseries based on Symbian^3, that shipped in February 2011.

The first hints that the Nokia E6-00 was being developed came, in early January 2011, from a Nokia XML and pictures from a Picasa album with pictures taken with the device. Various information could be retrieved from the XML such as the 8 MP camera, VGA display and QWERTY keyboard. The device was not officially announced at the Mobile World Congress held in Barcelona (14–17 February 2011). Various pictures and videos of the Nokia E6-00 leaked during the months of February and March.

It was officially announced at a special event, named Discover Symbian, on 12 April 2011 along with the Nokia X7 and the latest update of Symbian software. It was expected to be released in Q2 2011 in Europe at a price of €340 (before taxes and subsidies) and in Q3 2011 in North America.

In May 2011, the Nokia E6 became available at the Nokia Deutschland online shop for preorder at the price of €429.

== Hardware ==
=== Processors ===
The Nokia E6-00 is powered by the same processor found in other contemporary Symbian devices such as the Nokia N8, E7 and C7, Nokia e series which is an ARM11 clocked at 680 MHz with a Broadcom BCM2727 GPU which supports OpenVG1.1 and OpenGL ES 2.0 support.

=== Screen and input ===
The Nokia E6-00 has a 62.5 mm (diagonally) capacitive touchscreen with a resolution of 640 × 480 pixel (VGA, 326 ppi). According to Nokia, it is capable of displaying up to 16.7M colours. This pixel density was the highest among the smartphones launched at the time until the launch of Nokia Lumia 920. The screen brightness of the E6-00 is "more than double the brightness of the E72" when measured in candelas. There is a proximity sensor which deactivates the display and touchscreen when the device is brought near the face during a call. The Nokia E6 also understands PictBridge protocol so it's possible to directly print from the phone to a printer without using a computer to handle the data transfer in between.

The optical Navi key of the E72 has been replaced by a Navi key on the E6-00. It has also an ambient light sensor that adjusts the display brightness and activates the backlit of the 4-row keyboard. A 3-axis accelerometer is present but will not switch the display to portrait mode when the device is turned sideways. It will, however, take pictures in portrait and show them the right way in the photo gallery.

The device has an autonomous GPS with optional A-GPS functionality, Wi-Fi network positioning and Cell-ID and comes pre-loaded with the Ovi Maps application. Ovi Maps for Symbian^3 provides: free lifetime, turn by turn, voice guided car and pedestrian navigation. If the map is already downloaded to the device, Ovi Maps does not require an active data connection and can work as a stand-alone GPS navigator. For other services, for example Google Maps, a data connection is required.

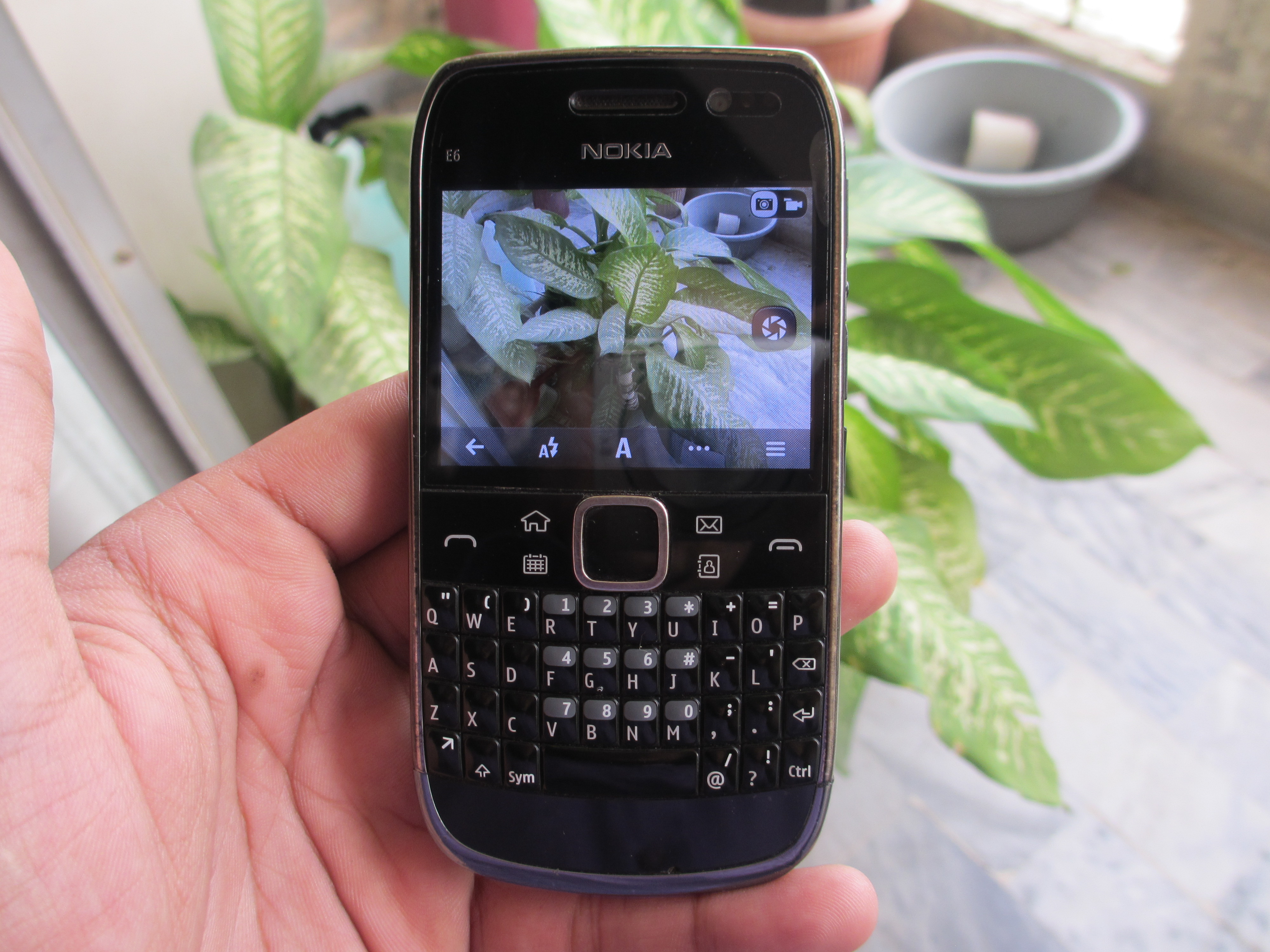
Live Camera view of Nokia E6's 8 Mega-Pixel Camera

The 8-megapixel (3264 × 2448 px) back camera has an extended depth of field feature (no autofocus), dual LED flash, 2X digital zoom (3X in video mode) and offers high definition (720p, 16:9 aspect ratio) video recording at 25 frame/s or 4:3 aspect ratio. The 0.3-megapixel front camera is capable of video recording (176 × 144 px at 15 frame/s) for video calling.

The Nokia E6 has a loudspeaker and two microphones. The microphone at the front of the device collects voices of the user, another microphone at the back of the device collects environmental noise for active noise cancellation, which makes user's voice in noisy environment sound clearer to the person at the other end of the line. Noise cancellation is not available when using the loudspeaker or a headset.

=== Buttons ===
On the front of the device, there is a QWERTY keyboard, call creation and call termination keys, home (menu), calendar, contact and email shortcut keys with short and long press features and a 5-way Scrolling (Navi key). On the top there is the power/lock button, on the right hand side there is the lock/unlock slider, which also turn on the torch (dual LED flash of the camera). Above that button, there are three keys: (1) volume down, (2) volume up and (3) a middle key for activating the voice commands (long press) and the voice recorder (short press). When the device is locked, pressing the Navi will also bring up a menu which allow to unlock the Nokia E6-00 from the touch screen.

The QWERTY keyboard comes in a variety (24) language versions, including Arabic, Thai, Russian and Chinese.

=== Audio and output ===
The E6-00 has a microphone and a loudspeaker located on the back of the device. There is a 3.5 mm four-contact audio jack which simultaneously provides stereo audio output and either microphone input or video output. PAL and NTSC TV out is possible using a Nokia Video Connectivity Cable (not included upon purchase) or a standard 3.5 mm audio jack to RCA cable.

There is a High-Speed USB 2.0 USB Micro-B connector provided for data synchronization, mass storage mode (client) and battery charging. The Nokia E6-00 supports for USB On-The-Go 1.3 (the ability to act as a USB host) using a Nokia Adapter Cable for USB OTG CA-157 (not included upon purchase).

The built-in Bluetooth v3 supports wireless earpieces and headphones through the HSP profile. The Nokia E6-00 is also capable of stereo audio output with the A2DP profile. Built-in car hands-free kits are also supported with the HFP profile. File transfer is supported (FTP) along with the OPP profile for sending/receiving objects. It is possible to remote control the device with the AVRCP profile. The DUN profile which permits access to the Internet from a laptop by dialing up on a mobile phone wirelessly (tethering). Other profiles are also supported (BIP, GAP, GAVDP, GOEP, HSP, PBAP, SAP, SDP and SPP). The device has an 87.5-108 MHz (76-90 MHz in Japan) FM receiver with RDS support. It has Wi-Fi b/g/n connectivity (single band) with support for WEP, WPA and WPA2 (AES/TKIP) security protocols.

=== Battery and SIM ===
The BP-4L 1500 mAh Li-ion battery performance, as provided by Nokia, are up to 14.8 hours of talk time, 681 h standby, 9 h of video playback, 4.7 h of video recording and up to 75 h of music playback.

=== Storage ===
The Nokia E6-00 has 8 GB of internal storage, which can be expanded with a microSDHC card up to 32 GB in size There is 1 GB of ROM, of which 350 MB is available to the user to install applications.

== Criticism and issues ==
=== Notification LED visibility ===
Some new users of the Nokia E6 have experienced problems with the notification LED which has been placed under the D-pad navigation key, as in previous models (E71, E72). However, it is apparent that Nokia has not allowed sufficient space between the D-pad key and the front face for the light to be visible. Nokia have acknowledged the problem but have not indicated whether a fix is possible in software by adjusting the brightness of the component.

There is one solution that was done by Aniket Patil (aniketroxx), it was to redirect the notification light to Red Mute key, which was used by many people as alternative to D-Pad Fix. That solution also helped user to see light without opening E6 from cover.

A revised Nokia E6 which has a hardware change to resolve the notification light issue started shipping on 22 October 2011.

=== Vibration alert not strong enough ===
Many users of the Nokia E6 reported that the vibration alert is not strong enough.

== Software ==
=== Symbian^3 "Anna" ===
Along with the Nokia X7, the E6-00 shipped with the updated Symbian^3 software user experience. This update, nicknamed "Anna", offers, amongst others:

- New icons.
- Improved text input with a split screen portrait QWERTY when entering text into web pages and applications.
- New web browser (v7.3) with an improved user interface (URL entry bar, always visible 'Go Back' and extended toolbar buttons), search-integrated address field, faster navigation and page loading.
- An updated Ovi Maps (v3.06) application with search for public transport routes, ability to download full country maps via WLAN or Nokia Ovi Suite and check-in to Facebook, Twitter and Foursquare.
- Hardware accelerated encryption.
- Increased file size limits for downloading over WLAN with Ovi Store (v2.06).
- Improved Social (v1.3) with status updates in contact card and ability to retweet and view follower list in Twitter.
- Flash Lite 4 that support some Flash Player 10.1 content such as YouTube.
- Java Runtime 2.2, Qt Mobility 1.1 and Qt4.7.

Preinstalled applications on the Nokia E6-00 include JoikuSpot Premium (mobile WiFi hotspot), World Traveler, F-secure Mobile Security and QuickOffice.

=== Nokia Belle ===
The stock OS version Symbian Anna was specially adapted to E6. The February 2012 Nokia Belle update was heavily criticised for its failure to meet special demands of E6 which had been met by the original stock firmware. In August 2012, Nokia Belle Refresh was made available.

=== Compatibility ===
Due to its VGA (640 × 480) resolution, compared to the nHD (640 × 360) of the other Symbian^3 devices, some application may be incompatible with the E6-00 if they are designed for nHD display. For example, Nokia guidelines stipulate that the user interface elements of the touch screen (accept button, virtual numpad, etc. ...) should be at least 7mm × 7mm. The high pixel density of the Nokia E6-00 means that the elements will need to be proportionately larger in pixels.

Compared to other recent Symbian^3 devices, the Nokia E6-00 has two extra homescreens bringing the total to 5 homescreens. This is to give users the same opportunity for customization as other devices with smaller displays accommodating 3 widgets per homescreen.

The Nokia E6 has WiFi coverage of the full spectrum of channels 1–13 in the crowded 2.4 GHz waveband (compared to just channels 1–11 on the E63 for example). It does not support the newer 5 GHz WiFi frequencies.

== See also ==
- List of Nokia products
- Nokia X7-00

Charging LED workaround for notifications
