= Nokia 8600 Luna =

Mobile phone model

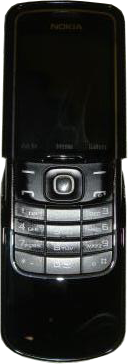
- Manufacturer: Nokia
- Availability by region: 2007
- Discontinued: 2012
- Predecessor: Nokia 8800
- Successor: Nokia N97
- Compatible networks: EDGE/GPRS/GSM 850/900/1800/1900
- Form factor: Slider
- Dimensions: 107 x 45 x 15.9 mm (4.21 x 1.77 x 0.63 inches)
- Weight: 140 g (4.9 oz)
- Operating system: Series 40 3rd Edition, Feature Pack 1
- Memory: 128MB
- Battery: BP-5M 900mAh 3.7V
- Rear camera: 1600 x 1200 px (2 MP)
- Display: TFT, 16.7 million colors, 240 x 320 pixels, 2 inches
- Connectivity: Bluetooth 2.0 +EDR, MicroUSB
- Data inputs: Keypad

The Nokia 8600 Luna is a mobile phone produced by Nokia. It has a stainless steel body, and weighs 140 grams.

Features include: TFT display (240 x 320 pixels), 2 megapixel camera, video recording and streaming, digital music player, and FM radio.
