= Samsung SGH-i550w =

Mobile phone model

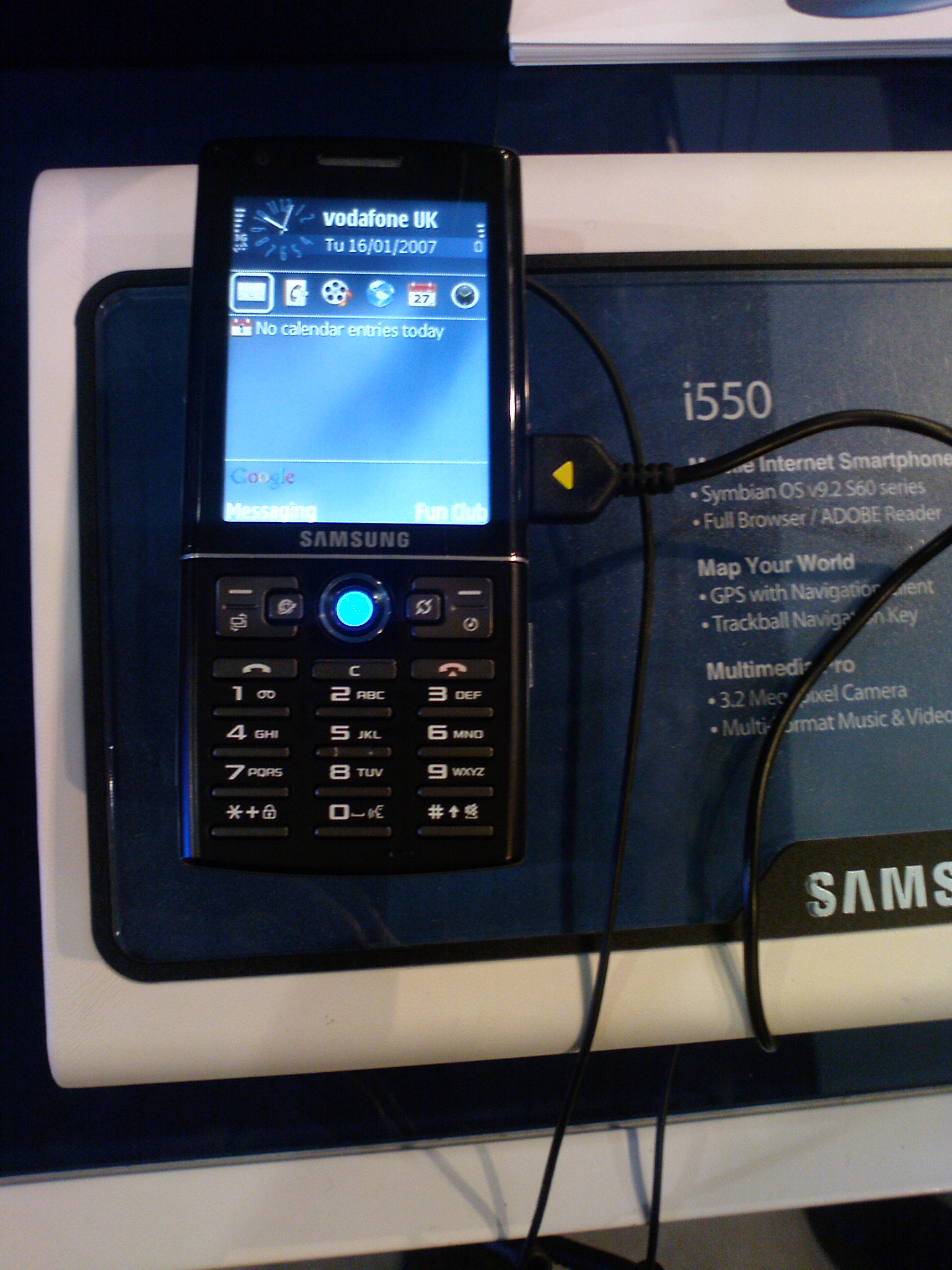

The Samsung SGH-i550w is a mobile phone from Samsung that belongs to their infotainment class. It has both Wi-Fi and 3.5G connectivity. It can play various multimedia formats. It has a 3.2 megapixel camera. It runs on S60 software, 3rd Edition, Feature Pack 1.
