= Nokia 3230 =

2004 cell phone model manufactured by Nokia

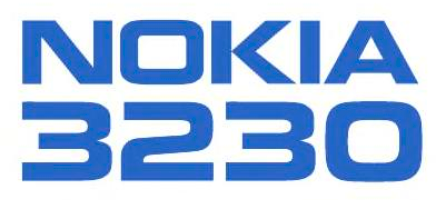

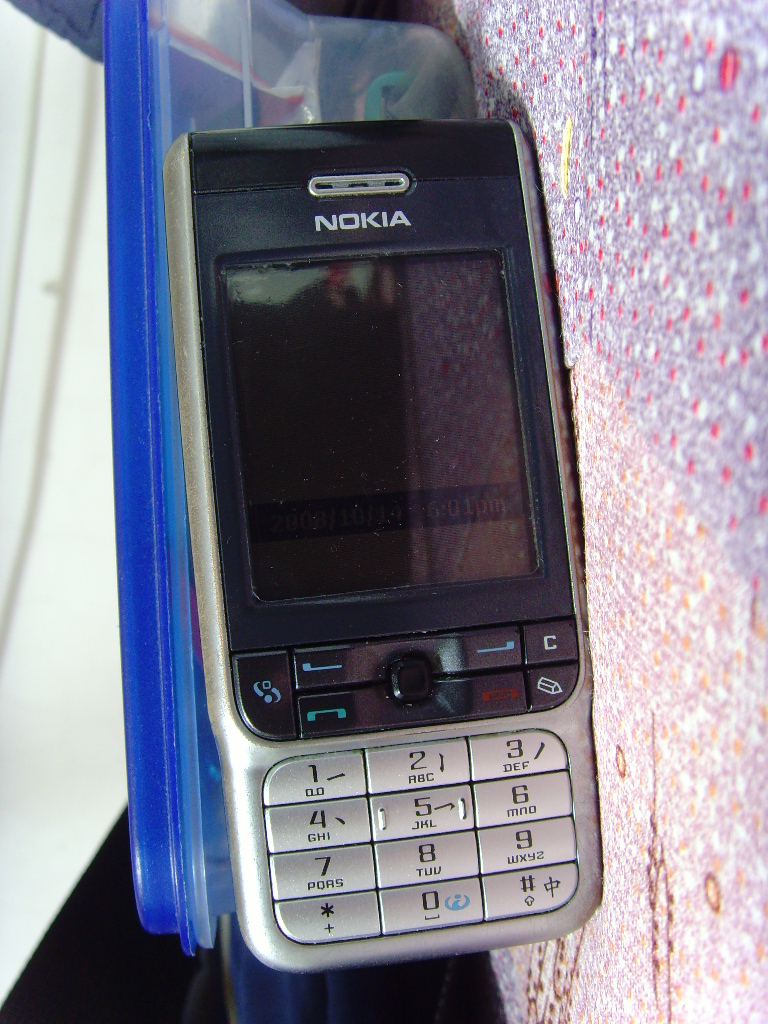
- Manufacturer: Nokia
- Availability by region: Q4 2004
- Predecessor: Nokia 3220; Nokia 3660
- Successor: Nokia 3250; Nokia 6120 classic
- Compatible networks: GSM 900/1800/1900
- Form factor: Candybar
- Operating system: Symbian OS 7.0s Series 60 2.1
- CPU: 32-bit RISC CPU based on ARM-9 series, 123 MHz
- Removable storage: RS-MMC (32 MB included)
- Battery: BL-5B Lithium Ion, 760 mAh
- Rear camera: 1.23 Mp
- Display: 16 bit, 176 x 208 pixels
- Connectivity: Bluetooth, IrDA
- Data inputs: Keypad

The Nokia 3230 is a Symbian Series 60 mobile phone announced on November 2, 2004. It was billed as the first Series 60 phone aimed at the mass-market rather than the higher-end Series 60 devices with a relatively low cost of 350 euros when released in Q4 2004. This phone was designed as a replacement for two previous youth-oriented Nokia phones - the Nokia 3660 Series 60 smartphone and the Nokia 3220 feature phone. No variant of this phone was released for the United States market.

It runs on Series 60 2nd Edition Feature Pack 1 (Version 2.1), based on Symbian OS 7.0s. It features several games (including multiplayer Bluetooth games), a 1.23-megapixel camera, Nokia Lifeblog, a 32 MB RS-MMC to store extra images and applications, Push to Talk, a 176×208 pixel 65,536-colour screen, multimedia messaging, and RealPlayer.

The Nokia 3230 is one of the first with Push to Talk over Cellular (PoC), a walkie-talkie style method of communicating, and also Visual Radio, which enhances a normal radio receiver with extra info about artists and songs delivered over GPRS.

For data transfer, the phone can use EDGE to upload up to 35.2 kbit/s and download up to 178.6 kbit/s, and is a GPRS multislot class 10, up to 80 kbit/s.

== Known issues ==
It has been frequently reported that fine dust get into the space between the LCD screen and the transparent plastic cover. The dust can be manually removed by opening the plastic case.

In common with many phones of this type, the battery life is not as much as you would expect on older models of phones. Less than 2 days is typical whereas older 'mono screen' phones can often manage a week between recharging.

Users also reported that before the call ringtone sound, the 3230 would give a loud "beep" sound, with no way to turn it off or control its volume. The device would beep even on silent mode. This issue was most common in the early models of the phone.

Other users have reported slow response times for the camera, sudden screen blackouts and random reboots.
