= Nokia C6-00 =

Smartphone made by Nokia Corporation

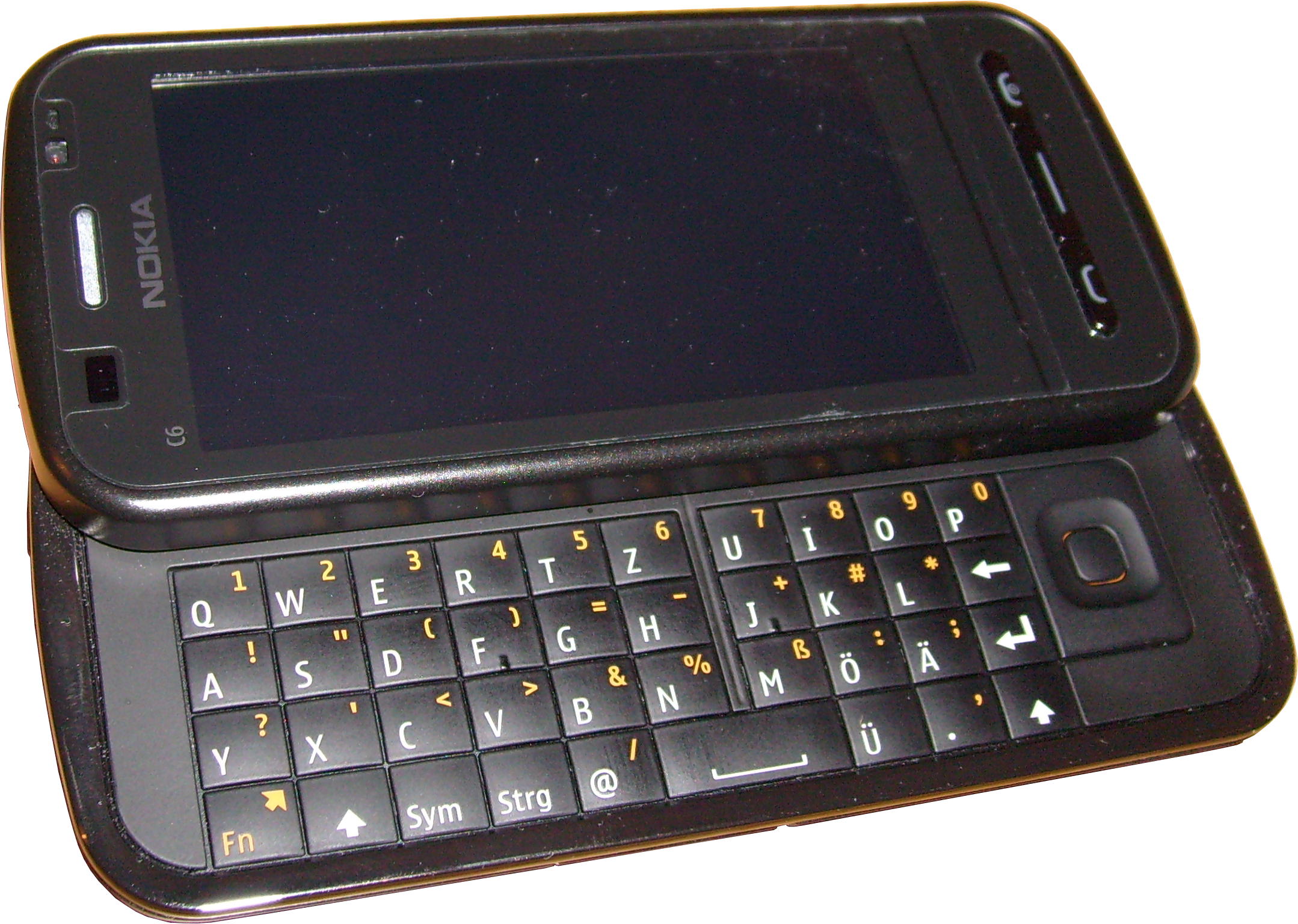
- Manufacturer: Nokia
- Series: Nokia Cseries
- Availability by region: 13 July 2010
- Predecessor: Nokia N97 Mini; Nokia E75; Nokia 6760 slide
- Successor: Nokia C7-00; Nokia C6-01
- Related: Nokia X6
- Compatible networks: GSM, GPRS, WCDMA, HSDPA
- Form factor: Slider
- Dimensions: 113.4 by 53 by 16.8 millimetres (4.46 in × 2.09 in × 0.66 in)
- Weight: 150 g (5 oz) (0.33 lb)
- Operating system: Symbian OS version 9.4; S60 5th edition
- CPU: ARM 11 (434 MHz)
- Memory: ROM: 512 MB NAND; RAM: 128 MB
- Storage: Maximum user storage: 240 MB
- Removable storage: Micro SD (up to 16 GB)
- Battery: BL-4J 3.7 V 1200 mAh
- Rear camera: 5-megapixel camera (2,584 × 1,938 pixels) 30 fps
- Front camera: Camera for video calls (QVGA)
- Display: LCD transmissive 3.2" resistive single touch screen (24-bit 16.7 million colours)
- External display: 640 × 360 (nHD)
- Connectivity: Local Connectivity: Bluetooth 2.0 +EDR; Bluetooth Stereo Audio; MicroUSB; MTP (Multimedia Transfer Protocol); Nokia AV 3.5 mm Nokia microUSB Cable CA-101; USB 2.0 High-Speed; USB Mass Storage; Bluetooth Profiles: A2DP, AVRCP, BIP, DUN, FTP, GAP, GAVDP, GOEP, HFP, HID, HSP, OPP, PBAP, SAP, SDP, SPP; Other: WLAN support 802.11b/g WEP; WPA; WPA2 (AES/TKIP); GPS/A-GPS
- Data inputs: Full backlit slide-out keyboard with navigation key; Cover keys (Home key, Send/End keys); Touch screen; Dedicated camera and volume keys; Side-mounted Lock key Accelerometer
- Development status: Discontinued

The Nokia C6-00 is a smartphone manufactured by Nokia, running the Symbian S60v5 operating system. It was announced on April 13, 2010. It is the fifth Symbian-based Nokia device featuring a slide-out QWERTY keyboard. It shares most of its hardware and software specifications as the N97 mini . One of the differences is that the sliding mechanism is flat, unlike the upward angle in the N97 and more similar to the Nokia E75. The phone has a 5-megapixel camera, though unlike the N97 mini, it lacked the Zeiss optics. It also has a secondary camera in front for video calls. The Nokia C6-01 is the successor to the C6-00 featuring the newer Symbian^3 operating system, but omitted the keyboard.

All applications for similar devices like the N97, the N97 Mini, the 5800 XpressMusic, and the 5230/5530 are compatible with the C6-00.

== Reviews ==
Cnet UK wrote that 'The C6 suffers from the worst excesses of the N97's software, without the saving grace of its solid hardware, resulting in a phone that's disappointing at any price.' Cnet Asia wrote that though the user interface is slow and outdated. However, they like the improved connectivity features, free real-time navigation with Ovi Maps and the generally well-built chassis.

T3 magazine said that 'This is a decent phone, but unlikely to convert anyone to Symbian, making it a handset for Nokia fans, with the priority of texting and emailing'. while techradar.com gave it three out of five stars and stated that while the phone had useful widgets and a nice screen that those features were countered by general usability frustrations. Stuff.TV also gave the phone three out of five stars and said that the C6 was an 'efficient enough phone' but felt outdated. Electricpig gave the phone two out of five stars and wrote that loved the sturdy nature of the phone and Nseries specifications but that they hated the unresponsive screen and bad button design.

Nokia C6-00 is currently non upgradeable to Symbian Belle Operating system.
