= Daxian N97 =

Chinese version of a Nokia cell phone

The Daxian N97 is a Chinese version of the Nokia N97 cell phone. It comes with a 3.0-megapixel camera, TV, FM radio, full qwerty keyboard, and many other features. The phones does not work in the United States but works in Europe. It is not as slim as the Nokia version.
