= Nokia 6760 Slide =

Symbian Series 60 mobile phone

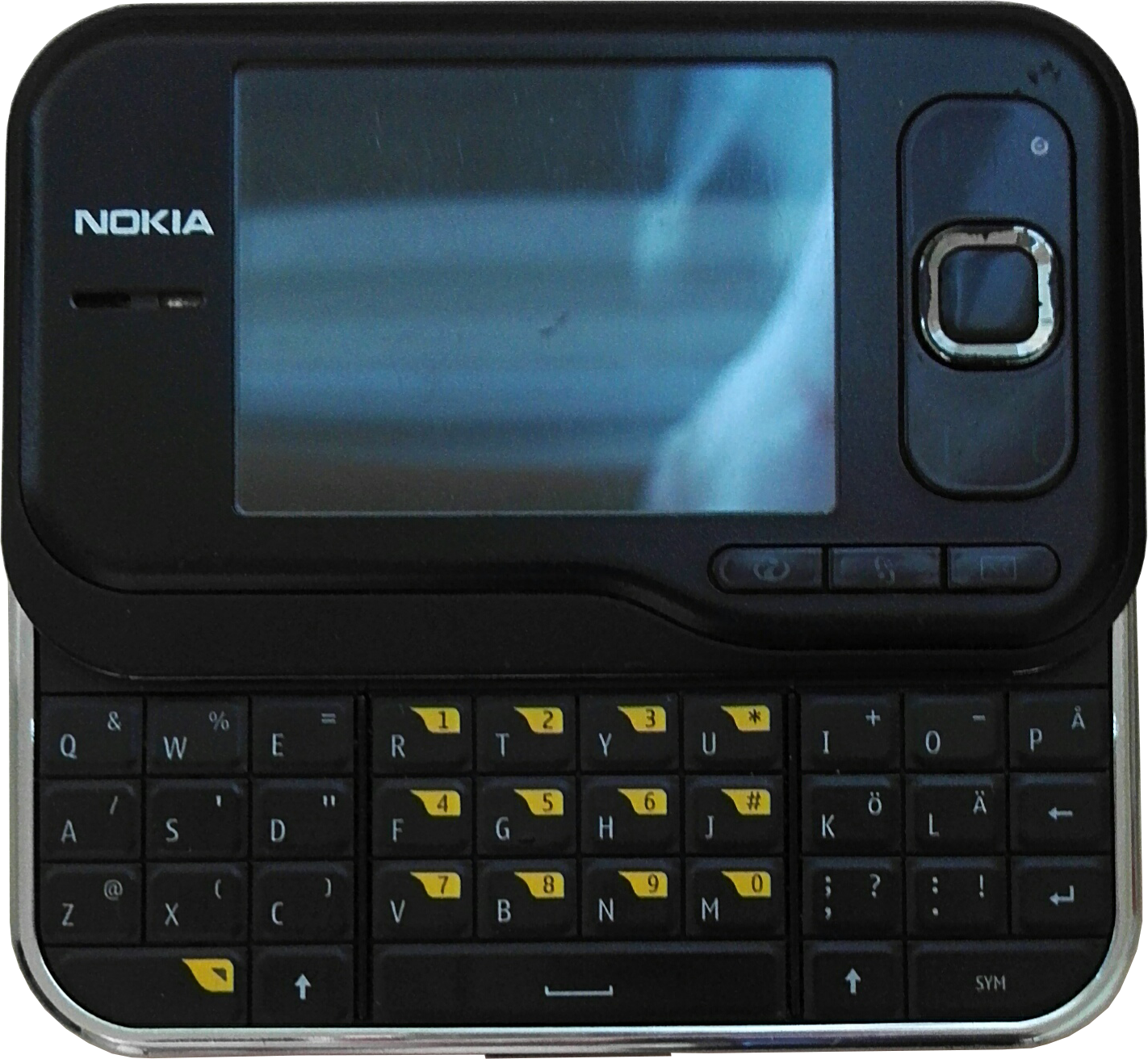
- Manufacturer: Nokia
- Discontinued: Yes
- Successor: Nokia C6-00; Nokia X5
- Related: Nokia E75; Nokia 5730 XpressMusic
- Compatible networks: HSDPA (3.5G) 900 / 1900 / 2100 (European) 850 / 1900 / 2100 (North American), Quad band GSM / GPRS / EDGE GSM 850, GSM 900, GSM 1800, GSM 1900
- Form factor: One-way slider
- Dimensions: 97.6×58×15.6 mm (3.84×2.28×0.61 in)
- Weight: 124.3 g (4 oz)
- Operating system: Symbian OS 9.3, S60 rel. 3.2
- CPU: ARM v4 192 MHz processor
- Memory: 128 MB internal
- Removable storage: MicroSD, up to 8 GB supported w/ microSDHC support
- Battery: BP-4L 1500 mAh Li-Polymer battery
- Rear camera: 3.2 Megapixels
- Display: 240x320 px, 2.4 in.
- Connectivity: USB 2.0 via MicroUSB, Bluetooth 2.0
- Data inputs: Keyboard

The Nokia 6760 Slide is a Symbian Series 60 mobile phone, unveiled in July 2009. One of its main selling points was its SMS messaging capabilities.

The phone was listed as a Messaging phone. It was also good for internet browsing, but was criticized for lacking Wi-Fi.

Nokia 6790 Surge (also known as Nokia Surge) was a US sibling of Nokia 6760 slide.

== Features ==
Designed for messaging on the move, the 6760 slide sports a full slide-out QWERTY keyboard.

Nokia messaging was standard which gave access to a range of popular email services, along with Mail for Exchange support and Message Reader. Google Talk and Windows Live Instant Messaging services were supported. It offered access to Facebook, Twitter and MySpace.

== Availability ==
The 6760 slide was released during the third quarter of 2009 for €199 before subsidies and taxes. It was initially available in black.
