= Nokia C6-01 =

Mobile phone by Nokia

- Manufacturer: Nokia
- Type: Smartphone
- Series: Cseries
- Availability by region: 4 November 2010
- Predecessor: Nokia E66; Nokia C5-00
- Successor: Nokia 701
- Related: Nokia C6-00; Nokia C7-00
- Compatible networks: HSDPA (Pentaband) (3.5G) 850 / 900 / 1700 / 1900 / 2100; Quad band GSM / GPRS / EDGE GSM 850, GSM 900, GSM 1800, GSM 1900
- Form factor: Monoblock
- Dimensions: 103.8 × 52.5 × 13.9 mm (4.09 × 2.07 × 0.55 in)
- Weight: 131 g (4.6 oz)
- Operating system: Symbian^3, upgradeable to Nokia Belle Refresh (111.040.1511)
- CPU: ARM11 684MHz processor
- Storage: up to 340 MB internal memory
- Removable storage: 2 GB Hot swap microSD included; up to 32 GB supported w/ microSDHC support
- Battery: BL-5CT 1050 mAh Li-Ion battery
- Rear camera: 8 Megapixels (main), 16:9 720p video, 25 FPS
- Front camera: VGA, for video calling
- Display: 640 × 360 px (nHD), 3.2" capacitive, multi-touch AMOLED display with the Nokia ClearBlack technology
- Connectivity: USB 2.0 via MicroUSB; USB On-The-Go; Bluetooth 3.0; 3.5mm jack; Wi-Fi 802.11b/g/n; GPS with A-GPS
- Data inputs: Capacitive multi-touch display; External functional hardware keys; Virtual keyboard; multiple text-entry options
- Development status: Retail Availability in Q4 2010

The Nokia C6-01 is a Symbian^3 smartphone from the Nokia Cseries. The C6-01 features a 3.2in AMOLED (640 × 360-pixels) display with capacitive touchscreen capabilities and Nokia's ClearBlack technology for improved outdoor visibility. The smartphone was released on November 4, 2010 for €260, excluding taxes and subsidies. Unlike its predecessor, Nokia C6-00, the C6-01 does not have a slide-out QWERTY keyboard, therefore making it similar to the higher-end models Nokia N8 and Nokia C7-00.

== Design ==
=== Dimensions ===
- Size: 103.8 × 52.5 × 13.9 mm
- Weight (with battery): 131 g (4.6 oz)
- Volume: 65 cm^{3} (4.0 cu in)

=== Keys and input methods ===
- Physical keys (Menu key, Call and End key, Power key, Lock key, Volume keys and a Two-Step Camera key)
- Finger touch support for text input and UI control
- On-screen alphanumeric keypad and full keyboard

=== Appearance ===
- Available in silver grey and black (colour availability varies by country).

=== Display and user interface ===
- Screen size: 3.2"
- Resolution: 16:9 nHD (640 × 360 pixels)
- Capacitive touchscreen with Active-matrix OLED technology
- The new ClearBlack technology for improved outdoor visibility.
- Orientation sensor
- Digital Compass (Magnetometer)
- Proximity sensor
- Ambient light detector

=== Personalisation ===
- Up to six customisable home screens (with Symbian Belle)
- Widgets
- Themes
- Customisable profiles
- Ring tones: MP3, AAC, eAAC, eAAC+, WMA, AMR-NB, AMR-WB
- Video ring tones
- Themed icons, wallpapers, screensavers
- Changeable colour themes

== Hardware ==
- CPU: ARM11 680 MHz (ARMv6 Architecture).
- RAM: 256 MB SDRAM.
- GPU: 2D/3D Graphics HW Accelerator with OpenVG1.1 and OpenGL ES 2.0 support.
- ROM: 1 GB internal NAND, up to 320 MB available to user.
- microSD memory card slot, hot swappable, 2 GB microSD included; up to 32 GB supported with microSDHC support.

=== Power management ===
- BL-5CT 1050 mAh Li-Ion battery.
- Talk-time (maximum):
  - GSM 690 mins
  - WCDMA 270 mins
- Standby time (maximum):
  - GSM 408 h
  - WCDMA 372 h
- Video playback time (maximum): 6 h
- Video recording time (maximum): 4 h
- Music playback time (maximum): 50 h

=== Data network ===
- GPRS/EDGE class B
- HSDPA Cat9, maximum speed up to 10.2 Mbit/s, HSUPA Cat5 2.0 Mbit/s
- WLAN IEEE 802.11 b/g/n
- TCP/IP support

=== Connectivity ===
- 2 mm connector
- Bluetooth 3.0
- Micro USB connector and charging
- High-Speed USB 2.0 (micro USB connector)
  - USB On-The-Go
- 3.5 mm Nokia AV connector
- FM radio

=== Operating frequency ===
- Quadband GSM/EDGE 850/900/1800/1900
- Pentaband WCDMA 850/900/1700/1900/2100
- Automatic switching between WCDMA & GSM bands
- Flight mode

== Software and applications ==
=== Software platform and user interface ===
The C6-01 runs the Symbian^3 operating system. Symbian^3 supports three home screens, each with up to six widgets that the user can customize. First software update Symbian Anna with major improvements was released. Again, Symbian Anna was replaced with Nokia Belle on February 7, 2012 which brings major improvements in user interface and core functions.

=== Applications ===
- PC Applications: Nokia Ovi Suite, Nokia Ovi Player
- Online applications: Nokia Ovi Store, internet, messaging, Maps, Web TV, Mail, Chat

=== Personal information management (PIM) ===
- Detailed contact information
- Calendar
- To-do list
- Notes
- Recorder
- Calculator
- Clock

== Navigation ==
- Integrated GPS, with A-GPS functionality
- Ovi Maps with free car and pedestrian navigation

== Photography ==
=== Camera ===
- 8 megapixel Digital camera Fullscreen 16:9 viewfinder with easy-to-use touchscreen parameters
- Still images file format: JPEG/Exif
- Smart Zoom up to 2× (digital) for still images
- Smart Zoom up to 3× (digital) for video
- Secondary camera for video calls (VGA, 640×480 pixels)
- Face recognition software

=== Image capture ===
- Automatic location tagging of images and videos
- Photo editor

=== Other ===
- Internal memory: up to 340 MB
- 2 GB MicroSD memory card included, hot swappable, up to 32 GB
- High-Speed microUSB to PC connectivity
- Processor:680Mhz

== Video ==
=== Video cameras ===
- Main camera
  - Video capture in 720p 25 fps with codecs H.264, MPEG-4
- Secondary VGA camera for video calls

=== Video sharing and playback ===
- HD 720p Video playback
- Video call and video sharing support (WCDMA network services)

== Music and audio ==
=== Music features ===
- Flick scroll user interface to browse the albums in your music collection
- Music codecs: MP3, WMA, AAC, eAAC, eAAC+, AMR-NB, AMR-WB

=== Radio ===
- Stereo FM radio (Wired headphones must be plugged in as they are used as the antenna)(FM Transmitter not included)
