= Nokia C7-00 =

Smartphone model

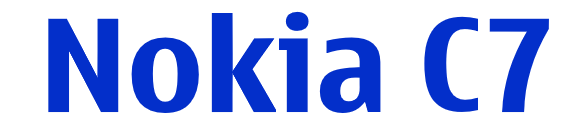

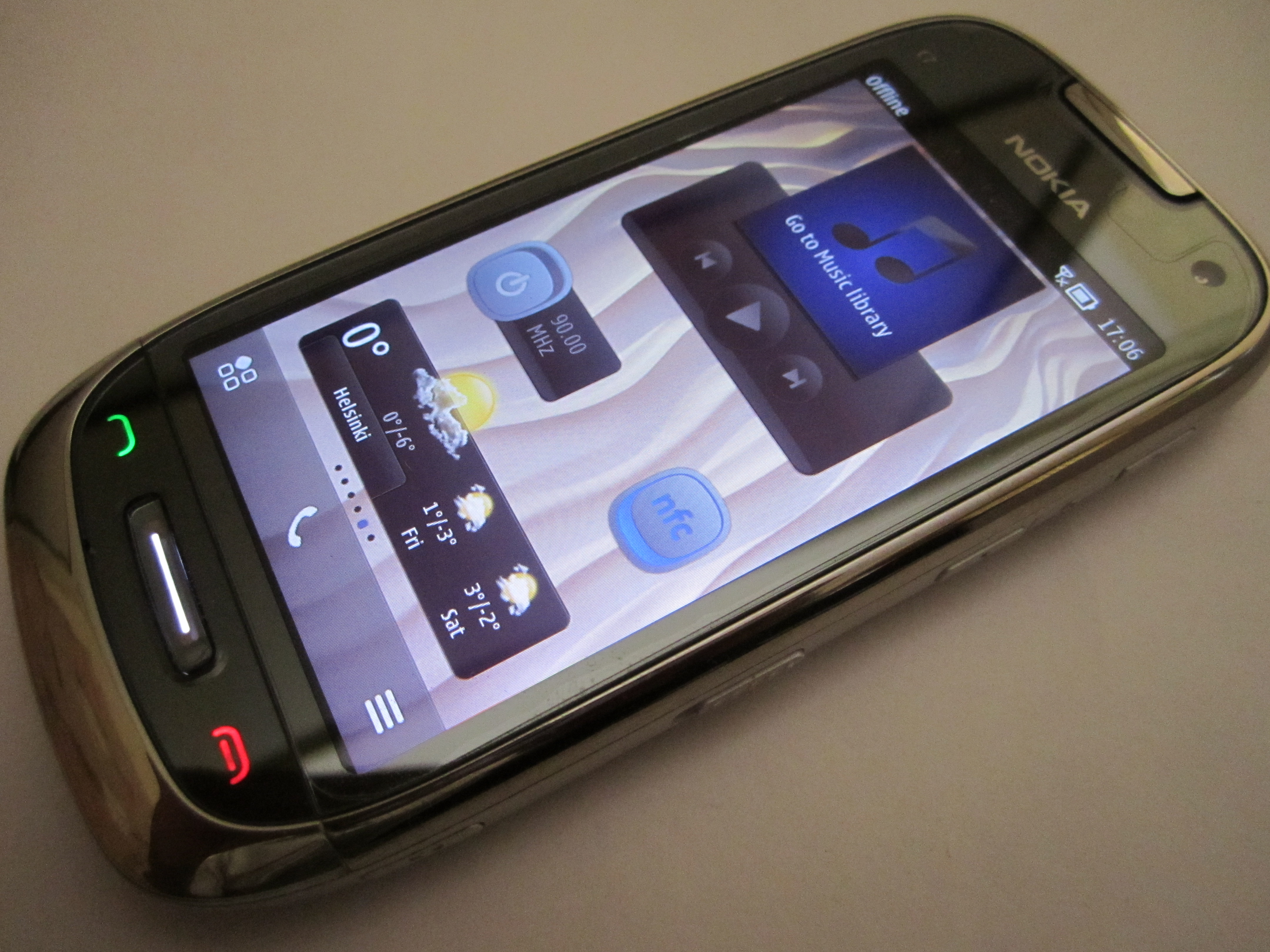
- Nokia C7
- Manufacturer: Nokia
- Series: Cseries
- Availability by region: 11 October 2010
- Predecessor: Nokia E66; Nokia 5800 XpressMusic; Nokia C6-00; Nokia N97 Mini
- Successor: Nokia 701, Nokia Lumia 710
- Related: Nokia N8, Nokia E7, Nokia C7 Astound, Nokia X7-00
- Compatible networks: HSDPA (Pentaband) (3.5G) 850 / 900 / 1700 / 1900 / 2100; Quad band GSM / GPRS / EDGE GSM 850, GSM 900, GSM 1800, GSM 1900
- Form factor: Monoblock
- Dimensions: 117.3 × 56.8 × 10.5 mm (4.62 × 2.24 × 0.41 in)
- Weight: 130 g (4.6 oz)
- Operating system: Symbian^3, upgradeable to Nokia Belle Refresh (111.040.1511)
- CPU: ARM11 680MHz processor
- Storage: up to 350 MB internal memory; 8 GB on-board memory; 1 GB ROM
- Removable storage: microSD, up to 32 GB microSDHC
- Battery: BL-5K 1200 mAh Li-Ion battery
- Rear camera: 8 Megapixels (main), 16:9 720p video, 30 FPS
- Front camera: VGA, for video calling
- Display: 640 × 360 px (nHD), 3.5" capacitive, multi-touch display with AMOLED technology
- Connectivity: USB 2.0 via MicroUSB; USB On-The-Go; Bluetooth 3.0; Wi-Fi 802.11b/g/n; GPS with A-GPS; NFC; DLNA
- Data inputs: Capacitive multi-touch display; External functional hardware keys; Virtual keyboard; multiple text-entry options
- Development status: Retail Availability in Q4 2010

The Nokia C7-00 is a mid-range smartphone from the Nokia Cseries. It was introduced on 14 September 2010 and released in Q4 2010. The C7-00 features a 3.5-inch (89 mm), 640 x 360 pixel capacitive touchscreen and features 720p video recording, and was the first smartphone to have NFC capability. The C7 shipped with Symbian^3 and is updatable to Symbian Belle (update made available on 7 February 2012).

The C7's round design has similarities to the Nokia E71. Nokia's mobile phone business head Anssi Vanjoki called it the "sleekest" device in the world. Unlike the Nokia N8 flagship, the C7 has physical call and hangup buttons.

== Variants ==
The Nokia C7 Astound was also released for the T-Mobile USA, but has only one casing colour available, and omits 1900 MHz HSDPA (3G) band.

On 25 May 2011 the premium Nokia Oro was announced, which has the same internal specifications and even looks exactly like the C7, but has 18-carat gold plating, leather and sapphire crystal materials. It shipped with the "Anna" Symbian update.

== NFC ==
The C7 shipped with an NFC chip built-in, but the chip was not enabled until the following year, with the release of Symbian Anna, a new version of the OS. The feature could be used to pair with headsets, read NFC tags, or, through AirTag e-commerce software, be used to accumulate loyalty points or pick up discount coupons.

== Firmware versions ==
The C7-00 runs the Symbian operating system, originally shipping with Symbian^3 and updatable to Anna and later Belle. Nokia Belle supports six home screens, each with re-sized widgets that the user can customise. Nokia released the Nokia Belle update via Nokia Suite (v3.3.86 or higher), with Anna previously released through FOTA or Nokia Suite (for PC or Mac) or Nokia Software updater on 18 August 2011. Nokia (Symbian) Belle v.111.030.0609 has been made available on 7 February 2012, along with other devices in the original Symbian^3 line-up. Several countries do not have the Belle update available for the Nokia C7. There is no current release date scheduled and it is not clear if the update will be released for the countries that do not currently have it available. If a phone has an IMEI indicating it is from one of these markets, it can not be updated to a Belle release.

== Specifications ==
=== Dimensions ===
- Size: 118.3 × 56.8 × 10.5 mm
- Weight (with battery): 130 g (4.6 oz)

=== Keys and input methods ===
- Touch screen
- On-screen alphanumeric keypad and full keyboard

=== Personalisation ===
- Six customisable home screens (in Nokia Belle)
- Widgets
- Themes
- Customisable profiles

=== Personal information management ===
- Detailed contact information
- Calendar
- To-do list
- Notes
- Recorder
- Clock

=== Navigation ===
- Integrated GPS, with A-GPS functionality
- Nokia Maps with free car and pedestrian navigation

=== Photography ===
==== Camera ====
- 8 megapixel (3264 x 2448 pixels) camera
- Aperture: f/2.8
- Focal length: 4.3 mm
- Fixed-focus lens with Extended Depth of Field (EDoF), marketed as "full focus"
- Still images file format: JPEG/Exif
- Secondary camera for video calls (VGA, 640×480 pixels)
- Face recognition software (in Nokia Store for older phones)

==== Image capture ====
- Automatic location tagging of images and videos
- Photo editor

=== Other ===
- Built-in memory: 8 GB
- MicroSD memory card slot, up to 32 GB
- NFC enabled

=== Video ===
==== Video cameras ====
- Main camera
  - Video capture in 720p 30 fps (after update to Nokia Belle) with codecs H.264, MPEG-4
  - Dual microphones for stereo audio recording
- Secondary VGA camera for video calls

==== Video sharing and playback ====
- HD 720p, 30 fps video playback
- Web TV
- Video call and video sharing
- DivX and Xvid support

=== Music and audio ===
- Music codecs: MP3, WMA, AAC, eAAC, eAAC+, AMR-NB, AMR-WB
- Short-range FM transmitter
