= Nokia E75 =

Mobile phone model

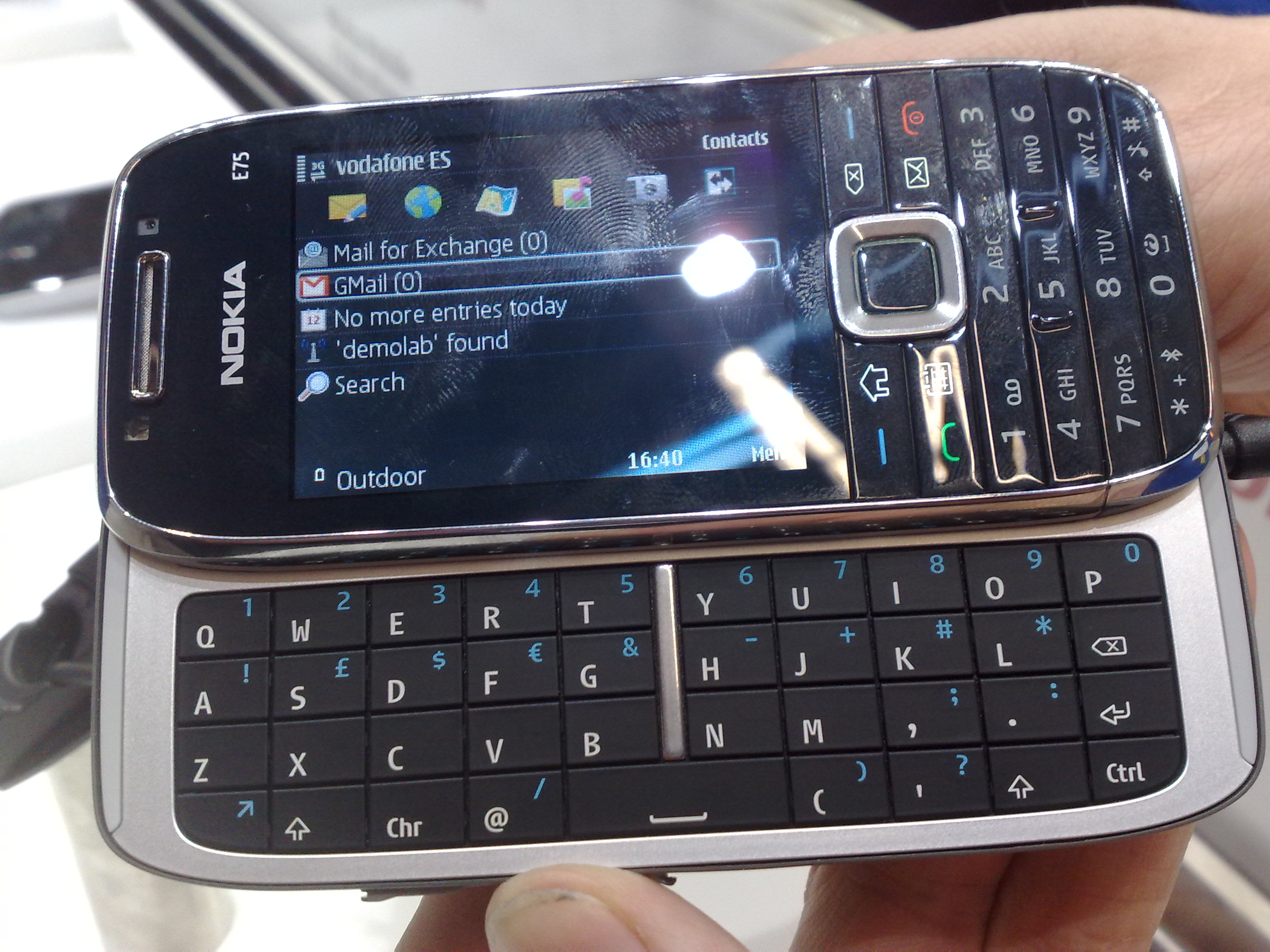
- Manufacturer: Nokia
- Availability by region: 15 February 2009
- Predecessor: Nokia E70; Nokia E90 Communicator
- Successor: Nokia C6-00; Nokia E7-00
- Related: Nokia 5730 XpressMusic; Nokia 6760 slide Nokia N97 Mini
- Compatible networks: Quad band GSM / GPRS / EDGE: GSM 850 / 900 / 1800 / 1900; Dual band UMTS / HSDPA
- Form factor: Side slider with full keyboard
- Dimensions: 111.8 × 50/80 × 14.4 millimeters
- Weight: 139 g (5 oz) Volume: 69 cc
- Operating system: S60 3rd Edition Feature Pack 2
- CPU: ARM11 369 MHz Freescale MXC300-30 processor
- Memory: 50 MB Internal user storage ROM: 256 MB; SDRAM: 128 MB; ~71 MB Free Executable RAM
- Removable storage: MicroSDHC Hot-swappable
- Battery: BL-4U, 3.7V 1000 mAh lithium-polymer
- Rear camera: 3.2 megapixel with auto focus and flash
- Front camera: Front-facing
- Display: 240 × 320 px, 2.4 in, up to 16 million colors
- Connectivity: WLAN Wi-Fi 802.11 b,g, Integrated & Assisted GPS, Bluetooth 2.0, microUSB, 3.5 mm Nokia AV connector
- Data inputs: QWERTY sliding keyboard, keypad, five-way joystick
- Other: FOTA (Firmware update Over The Air)

The Nokia E75 is a Symbian-powered smartphone by Nokia with both a side sliding QWERTY keyboard and a numerical keypad. It is compatible with the Nokia Mobile TV Headset (SU-33W).

== See also ==
- Nokia Eseries
- Nokia 5730 XpressMusic, another Nokia device with an identical form factor released in 2009.
- List of Nokia products
