= Nokia E7-00 =

Cell phone model

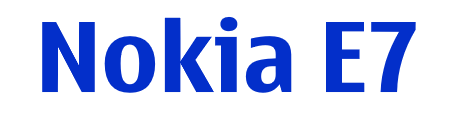

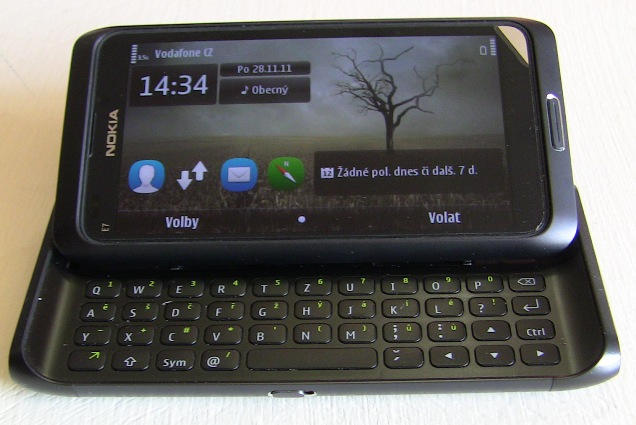
- Manufacturer: Nokia Finland
- Series: E-series
- Availability by region: 7 February 2011
- Predecessor: Nokia E75; Nokia E90 Communicator; Nokia N97
- Successor: Nokia 808 PureView
- Related: Nokia N8; Nokia N900
- Compatible networks: HSDPA (Pentaband) (3.5G) 850 / 900 / 1700 / 1900 / 2100; Quad band GSM / GPRS / EDGE GSM 850, GSM 900, GSM 1800, GSM 1900
- Dimensions: 123.7 mm (4.87 in) H 62.4 mm (2.46 in) W 13.6 mm (0.54 in) D
- Weight: 176.0 g (6.21 oz)
- Operating system: Symbian^3, upgradeable to Nokia Belle Refresh (111.040.1511)
- CPU: ARM 11 @ 680 MHz
- Storage: 16 GB external mass storage, 256 MB RAM, 1 GB ROM
- Removable storage: none
- Battery: BL-4D (1200mAh) Li-Ion battery (removable by service); micro-USB charging
- Rear camera: 8 Megapixels (main), 16:9 720p video, 35 FPS. Dual LED flash (can be used as flashlight by holding the Lock key).
- Front camera: VGA, for video calling
- Display: 640 × 360 px (nHD), 4" capacitive, multi-touch ClearBlack AMOLED
- Data inputs: Capacitive multi-touch display; QWERTY thumb keyboard
- Development status: Discontinued
- SAR: 0.56 W/kg (head)

The Nokia E7-00, also known as Nokia E7, is a smartphone by Nokia with a QWERTY keyboard that was marketed as part of the business-oriented Nokia Eseries. It was announced at Nokia World in September 2010 together with the Nokia C6-01 and Nokia C7 and started shipping in February 2011, retailing for 495€ / HK$4898 / £375. As with the other two, it ships with the Symbian^3 operating system.

Aside from the addition of the physical keyboard, many of the E7's specifications are similar to the more multimedia-focused Nokia N8. Differences include the lack of a memory card slot, no FM transmitter, a less advanced camera with extended depth-of-field, instead of autofocus as in the N8 and the Nokia E90. However, it retains the N8's HDMI connection and a non-removable battery. The slide features a similar upward-facing mechanism as the Nokia N97. While it was not part of the Nokia Communicator, many regional marketing literature unofficially considers it as such, being the spiritual successor of the E90.

Compared to the N97 and E90, the E7 has a multitouch capacitive touchscreen. Unlike the N8, N97, and the E90, the E7 has an AMOLED ClearBlack display with a slightly lower resolution than the E90's primary display. Vlasta Berka, general manager of Nokia Singapore, Malaysia and Brunei, talked about the trend of users who are using their smartphones for business.

== Design ==
=== Dimensions ===
- Size: 123.7 mm × 62.4 mm × 13.6 mm (4.87 in × 2.46 in × 0.54 in)
- Weight (with battery): 176 g (6.2 oz)
- Volume: 97.8 cm^{3} (5.97 cu in)

=== Keys and input methods ===
- Full QWERTY keyboard
- Home key, power key, lock key, camera key, volume key
- Finger touch support for text input and UI control
- On-screen alphanumeric keypad and full keyboard
- Possibility to use capacitive stylus
- Full screen handwriting recognition
- Handwriting recognition for Chinese

=== Appearance ===
- Anodised aluminium casing available in dark grey, silver white, blue, green and orange

=== Display and user interface ===
- Screen size: 4"
- Resolution: 16:9 VGA(640 × 360 pixels) AMOLED
- 16 million colours
- Capacitive touch screen
- Orientation sensor (Accelerometer)
- Compass (Magnetometer)
- Proximity sensor
- Ambient light detector

=== Personalisation ===
- Up to three customisable home screens: menu, widgets, themes, shortcuts, icons, customisable profiles (with an update of Symbian Belle you got a six home screens with some new and enlarged widgets)
- Ringtones: MP3, AAC, eAAC, eAAC+, WMA, AMR-NB, AMR-WB
- Video ringtones
- Themes: wallpapers, screensavers, audio themes & pre-installed themes
- Changeable colour themes

== Hardware ==
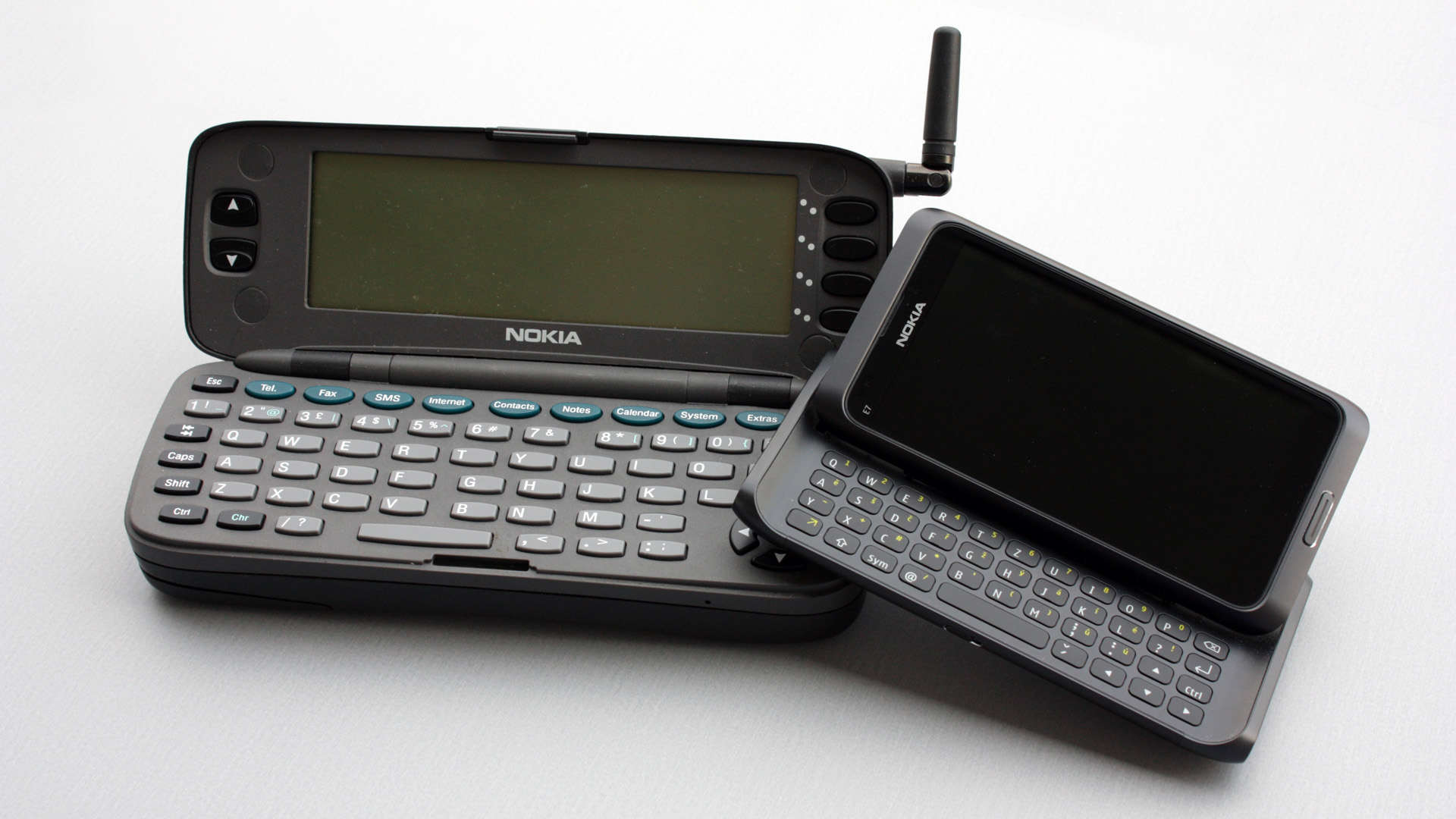
Nokia E7 beside the first communicator, Nokia 9000 Communicator.

=== Power management ===
- BL-4D 1,200 mAh Li-ion battery
- Talk time (maximum):
  - GSM up to 540 mins (9 h)
  - WCDMA up to 300 mins (5 h)
- Standby time (maximum):
  - GSM up to 430 h (17 d, 22 h)
  - WCDMA up to 470 h (19 d, 14 h)
- Charging port:
  - Micro-USB

=== Data network ===
- GPRS/EDGE class B, multislot class 33
- HSDPA Cat9, maximum speed up to 10.2 Mbit/s, HSUPA Cat5 2.0 Mbit/s
- WLAN IEEE 802.11 b/g/n
- Capability to serve as data modem
- Support for Microsoft Outlook synchronisation of contacts, calendar and notes

=== Memory ===
- Internal memory: 16 GB, not expandable.

=== Operating frequency ===
- GSM/EDGE 850/900/1800/1900
- WCDMA 850/900/1700/1900/2100
- Automatic switching between WCDMA and GSM bands
- Flight mode

=== Connectivity ===
- Bluetooth 3.0
- HDMI
- High-Speed USB 2.0 (micro USB connector)
- Micro-USB connector and charging
- USB On-the-Go
- Standard 3.5 mm AV connector
- FM Radio
- Built-in wireless b/g/n connectivity adapter

== Criticism ==
The Parliament of Finland bought 200 E7s in spring 2011; by late April 2012, over 50 of these phones had been serviced under warranty. Most of them were fixed by an OS update.

The E7's battery is not user-removable, although unofficial online tutorials on how to replace the battery exist.

Being one of Nokia's first phone designs without a dedicated connector for charging, the USB connector in the E7 is also used for charging, and is a common point of failure.
