= Nokia C7 Astound =

Smartphone model

- Manufacturer: Nokia
- Type: AMOLED capacitive touchscreen
- Availability by region: unknown
- Compatible networks: GSM 850/900/1800/1900 MHz, HSDPA 900/2100 MHz
- Form factor: bar
- Dimensions: 117.3×56.8×10.5 mm (4.62×2.24×0.41 in), 64 cc
- Weight: 130 g (4.59oz)
- Operating system: Symbian OS 3, upgradable to Symbian Belle
- Memory: 8 GB, 256 MB RAM, CPU 1 GHz
- Removable storage: microSD expandable up to 32GB
- Battery: 1200 mAH (BL-5K) Li-Ion, Standby -555 h, Talktime- 9h 30min
- Rear camera: 8 MP, 720p, VGA, 3264x2448 px, secondary 0.3 MP, VGA
- Display: 3.5" 360x640 px, TFT, 16M color
- Development status: not available

Nokia C7 Astound was a smartphone running on Symbian 3 OS. The device came with many modern features and was available in three colors: Frosty Metallic, Charcoal Black and Mahogany Brown.

== Features ==
The device included Bluetooth v3.0 with support in A2DP and EDR. Unlike previous versions of Nokia Symbian, it came with A-GPS, wi-fi 802.11 b/g/n and 3G connectivity. The device had a primary camera of 8 megapixels with dual LED flash, 2x digital zoom, and fixed focus. Internet access was via HTML browser. Connectivity was via USB, GPRS, EDGE and 3G. The device supported Java MIDP 2.1. The device had a Corning Gorilla Glass screen. It had three sensors: accelerometer, proximity sensor and a compass.

== Music, Video and radio ==
The device supported a wide range of music formats including MP3, WMA, AAC, eAAC, eAAC+, AMR-NB and amp, WB, E-AC-3. It supported active noise control. The device had stereo FM radio with FM recording, RDS and FM transmitter.

The video camera included recording 720p at 25 fps, later upgraded to 30 fps. It supported 3GP, DivX, Xvid, MP4, H.264 and WMV.

== Software ==
Nokia C7 Astound supported Java MIDP v2.1, with Java applications including Web TV and TV Out. It had Ovi Maps 3.0. For office use and education it had Quick Office Document Viewer and Adobe Reader. The document viewer supported Word, Excel, PowerPoint and Office access. Adobe Flash Lite was preinstalled for better browsing.
