= Anssi Vanjoki =

Finnish businessman

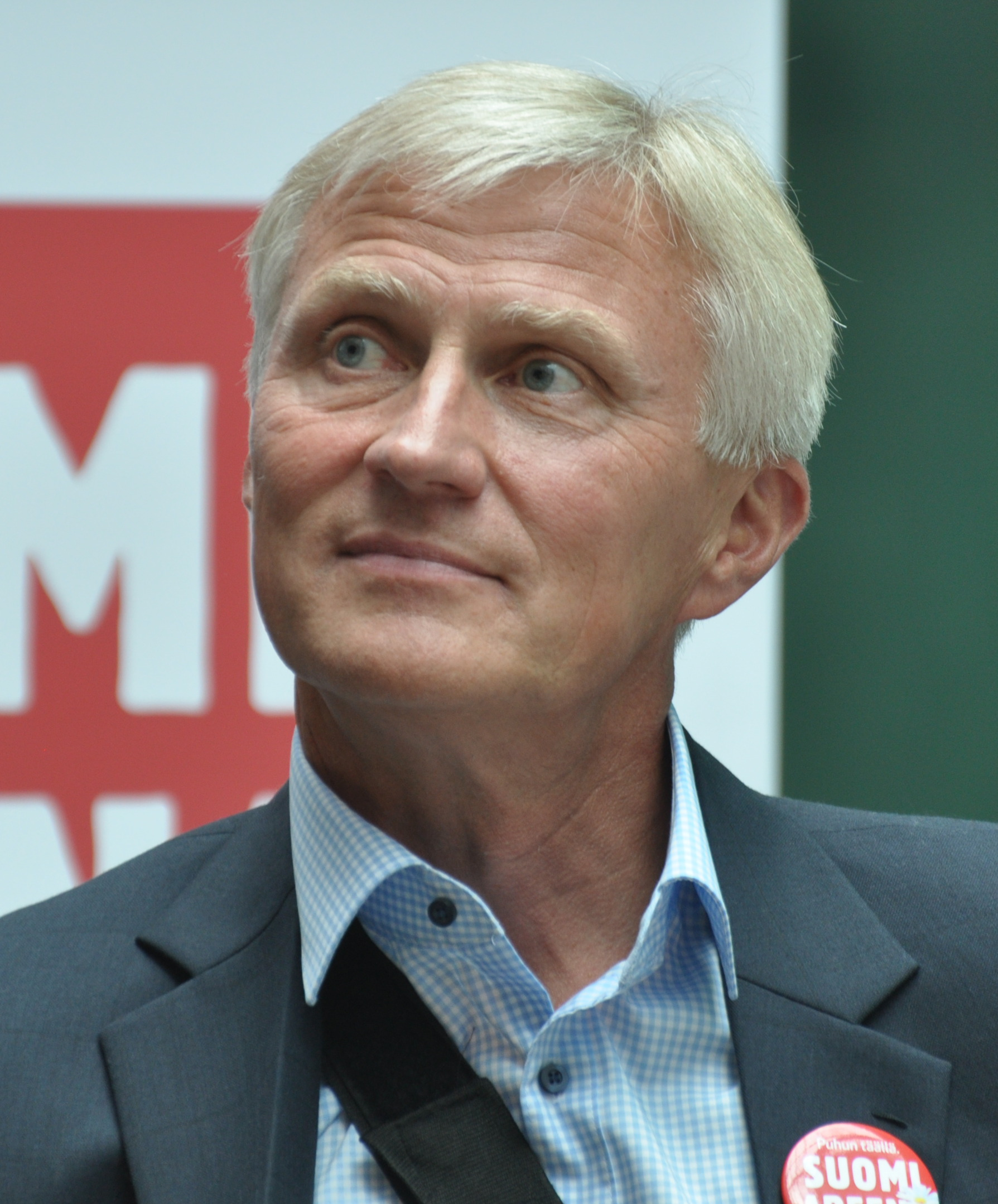
- at SuomiAreena in Pori, Finland, 2014.
- Born: Anssi Markku Kaleva Vanjoki; 13 September 1956 (age 69); Helsinki, Finland
- Education: Helsinki School of Economics and Business Administration
- Occupation: Businessman
- Title: former Executive Vice President of Nokia
- Term: 1998–2010
- Board member of: Elisa

Anssi Markku Kaleva Vanjoki (born 13 September 1956) is a Finnish businessman who was Executive Vice President of Nokia and member of the executive board from 1998 to 2010.) Vanjoki is the director of Rantakesä-RKBS Oy, which provides business management consulting services, and the CEO of Aqsens Oy, which manufactures measurement, testing and navigation equipment. He serves on the board of the Järvelä-based wood processing company Koskinen and the Helsinki-based patent company Atacama Labs Oy. In addition, Vanjoki has served as the chairman of the board of Amer Sports, on the boards of the Oulu earlight company Valkee Oy and the Basware software company from Espoo. Vanjoki has served as chairman of the board of Oriola in 2015–2020 and chairman of the board of Elisa since 2019.

== Career ==
Vanjoki served on the board of Nokia since 1998 and he worked for Nokia since 1991. He worked, among other things, as director of the Markets unit, director of the Multimedia business group and director of Nokia Mobile Phones. Vanjoki was a member of the group assembled by CEO Jorma Ollila, the so-called "dream team". Vanjoki has been the chairman of the board of Amer Sports Oyj and a member of the board of Sonova Holding AG. Vanjoki has a master's degree in business administration.

Vanjoki is the former director of Nokia's wireless services unit. Vanjoki left the company in September 2010. He was nominated as Nokia's new CEO to replace Olli-Pekka Kallasvuo, but the company chose Canadian Stephen Elop as its director. Vanjoki started at Lappeenranta University of Technology as a professor (Professor of Practice) in the fall of 2013.

After Nokia, at the end of 2010, Vanjoki invested in the earlight company Valkee Oy company. In January 2011, Vanjoki invested in Apple's iPhone Game Book service intended for golf players, and at the same time became a board member of Free Drop Innovations Oy Ltd. Vanjoki considered Nokia's alliance with Microsoft in autumn 2011 unnecessary. In 2012, he gave up Nokia's stock. He considered the transfer of Nokia's phone unit to Microsoft in September 2013 shameful.

== Personal life ==
In October 2001, Vanjoki received a fine for speeding, i.e. 690 000 marks (about 116 000 euros). The fine sparked a social debate and, among others, according to the Minister of Justice Johannes Koskinen, "the entire system of fines has to be revised due to the shortcomings written into the law". In February 2002, the Helsinki District Court reduced Vanjoki's fine to 35 000 marks (about 5 900 euros), because according to the salary statements submitted by Nokia, Vanjoki's income had decreased.

Vanjoki is the father of basketball players Anselmi and Viljami Vanjoki.
