= Nokia X5 =

Mobile phone model

Nokia X5-00/01
- Manufacturer: Nokia
- Series: Nokia Xseries
- Availability by region: June 2010 (China), September 2010 (Worldwide)
- Predecessor: Nokia 6760 slide Nokia E63; Nokia C3-00
- Successor: Nokia X7-00
- Compatible networks: TD-SCDMA (model-00), HSDPA (3.5G) (model-01), Quad band GSM / GPRS / EDGE GSM 850, GSM 900, GSM 1800, GSM 1900
- Form factor: Candybar (model-00), QWERTY slider (model-01)
- Dimensions: 113.0 × 49.8 × 14.7 mm (model-00), 74.3 × 66.4 × 16.8 mm (model-01)
- Weight: 120 g (4 oz) (model-00), 129 g (model-01)
- Operating system: Symbian OS v9.3 (S60 (software platform)) 3rd Edition FP2
- CPU: ARM11
- Memory: 256 MB flash memory (model-00), 200 MB (model-01)
- Storage: microSDHC (up to 8 GB for model-00 and 32 GB for model-01)
- Battery: BL-5F (950 mAh)
- Rear camera: 5.0-megapixel with dual LED flash
- Display: 240×320 4:3 2.4-inch (6.1 cm) TFT LCD screen for model-00, 320×240 2.36-inch (6.0 cm) for model-01
- Connectivity: WLAN 802.11b/g with UPnP (model-01 only), USB 2.0, Bluetooth 2.0, GPS, aGPS
- Data inputs: Keypad, proximity sensor, accelerometer

Nokia X5-00/01 are a pair of smartphones in the X-Series of Nokia's mobile phones. The original China model comes with Symbian OS 9.3, while the worldwide model uses S60 3rd Edition FP2. Both models feature different designs; the X5-00 is a candybar with T9 alphanumeric keypad, while the X5-01 is a slider with a QWERTY keyboard. Due to the inclusion of the QWERTY keyboard, the X5-01 is considered a successor to the S40-based Nokia C3-00.

== Release history ==
The X5-00 was released in China in the second quarter of 2010 as the X6 could not be released in that region. This is due to China is still using the partial-3G TD-SCDMA mobile network for their mobile phones unlike other selected countries which started to use the 3.5G HSDPA mobile network. Although the original version of the X5 is China's alternative version of the original X6, it does not have a large on-board memory and the Comes with Music service.

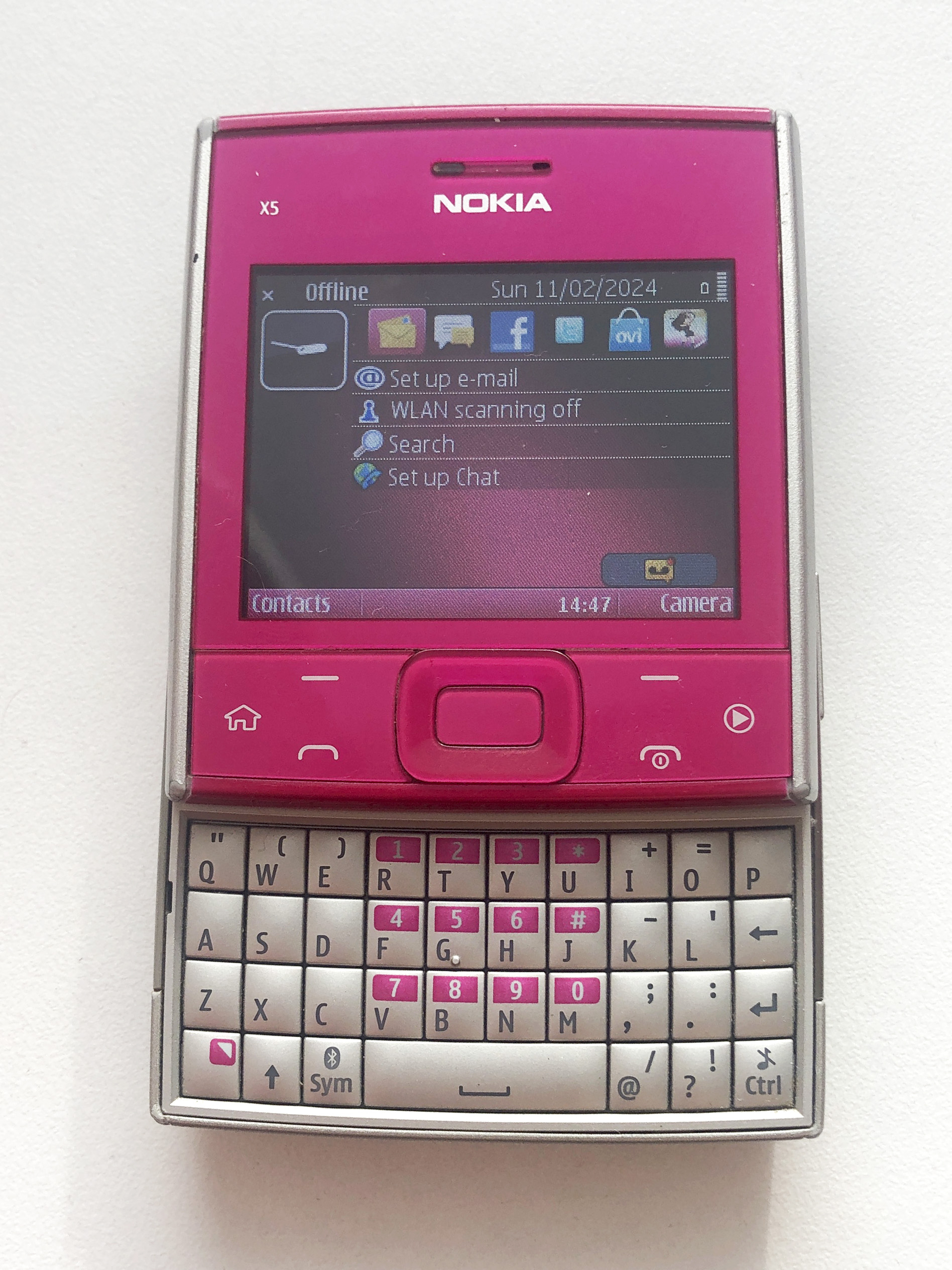
A purple Nokia X5-01 with its keypad slid

Later in June 2010, Nokia announced that the X5 will gain a release in countries other than China. Named the X5-01, it features a wider but smaller 2.36-inch screen, better microSDHC support (up to 32 GB SDHC) and will use the HSDPA network mode. It was released in September 2010.

In July 2018, HMD global released a new Android phone with the same name, Nokia X5 (2018).

== Features ==
The original X5 is a candybar mobile phone with an alpha-numeric keypad and features a Carl Zeiss 5-megapixel camera equipped with a dual LED flash, 256 MB internal memory and can use up to an 8 GB microSD card while Nokia X5-01 is a slider mobile phone with a QWERTY/QWERTZ keypad (depending on country of sale) and features the same five megapixels camera with the same LED flash, ARM 11 600 MHz processor, 200 MB internal memory and up to 32 GB microSD (2 GB card included with sales package). Only the X5-01 has Wi-Fi and both phone models have Bluetooth connectivity, running the Symbian OS 9.3, Series 60 v3.2 UI.

== Design ==
While the design of the original X5 having mixed reviews despite it being a China-only release, the design of the X5-01 has come under great criticism as being vastly deficient.

The dimensions of the phone are 74.3 × 66.4 × 16.8 mm with a weight of 129 grams and a display of 2.36". The phone comes with a full QWERTY keypad and is available in six colors: Yellow, Green, Purple, Pink, Azure and Graphite Black. The phone comes with an additional 3 labeled soft keys, Media Keys, Volume Keys and Navi Keys.
