= 9500 =

9500 may refer to:

- The year 9500, in the 10th millennium.
- 9500 Camelot, an asteroid belt
- ATI Radeon 9500, a computer graphics card series
- NVIDIA GeForce 9500, a computer graphics card series
- Nokia 9500 Communicator, a smartphone
- Power Macintosh 9500, a computer
