= Nokia Communicator =

Smartphone model series by Nokia

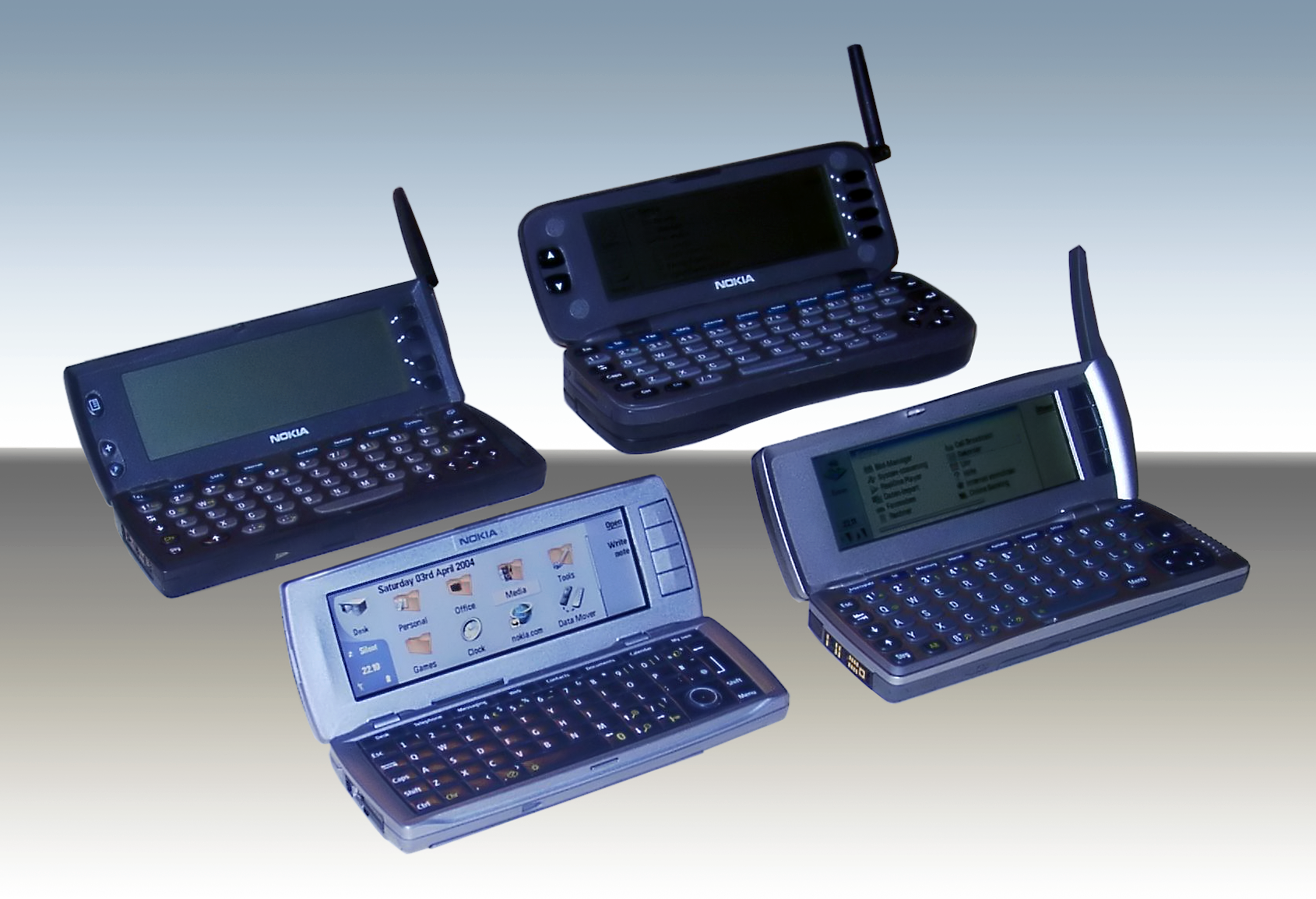
Four devices of the Communicator series, all unfolded: Nokia 9000, 9110, 9210 and 9500

The Nokia Communicator is a series of business-optimized smartphones marketed by Nokia Corporation, featuring a laptop-like form factor, which opens in a clamshell format to access its QWERTY keyboard and an LCD screen nearly the size of the device footprint.

Nokia Communicators have Internet connectivity and clients for Internet and non-Internet communication services. The series introduced features that would become staples in modern smartphones. The final Communicator model, the Nokia E90, is part of the Nokia Eseries. The Nokia E75 (2009) and Nokia E7 (2010), were considered spiritual successors to the Communicator series.

== Models ==
Model		Nokia 9000 Communicator, 9000i	Nokia 9110 Communicator, 9110i	Nokia 9210 Communicator, 9210i, 9290	Nokia 9300 Communicator, 9300i, 9500	Nokia E90 Communicator
Released		1996	1998	2001	2004	2007
Operating system		PEN/GEOS 3.0		Symbian OS version 6.0, Series 80 v1.0	Symbian OS version 7.0s, Series 80 v2.0	Symbian OS version 9.2, S60 3rd Edition
Processor	Model	Intel 80386BX	AMD Élan SC450 Am486	ARM920T	Ti OMAP 1510	Ti OMAP 2420
Processor	clock speed	24 MHz	33 MHz	52 MHz	150 MHz	332 MHz
Memory	RAM (accessible)	4 MB (4×2^{20} bytes)	4 MB	8 MB	64 MB (39.6 MB)	128 MB (110 MB)
Memory	ROM (accessible)	4 MB (2 MB)	4 MB (2 MB)	16 MB (2 MB)	128 MB (79.8 MB)	256 MB (136 MB)
Screen	Internal	4.5 in (110 mm) 640×200 monochrome STN, 8 grayscales	4.5 in (110 mm) 640×200 backlit monochrome STN, 8 grayscales	4.5 in (110 mm) 640×200 color transflective TFT, 4,096 scales	4.5 in (110 mm) 640×200 color transflective TFT, 4,096 scales	3.9 in (99 mm) 800×352 color transflective TFT, 16,777,216 scales
Screen	External	50×38 backlit monochrome STN, 2 grayscales	1.3 in (33 mm); 80×48 backlit monochrome STN, 2 grayscales	1.3 in (33 mm); 84×48 backlit monochrome STN, 2 grayscales	1.3 in (33 mm); 84×48 backlit monochrome STN, 2 grayscales	2 in (51 mm); 240×320 color transflective TFT, 16,777,216 scales
Weight		397 g (14.0 oz)	253 g (8.9 oz)	222 g (7.8 oz)	222 g (7.8 oz)	210 g (7.4 oz)

The Nokia 9300 and 9300i (running Symbian OS version 7.0s and Series 80 v2.0) are very similar to the Nokia 9500 but were not marketed under the Communicator name by Nokia. Likewise, the Nokia N97 and Nokia E7 (running Symbian^3) from 2009 and 2011 respectively are also similar to the Communicator series, but not marketed as it.

== In popular culture ==
- The first Nokia smartphone in the movies was Nokia Communicator 9000: Val Kilmer as The Saint used the device to foil the plans of a villainous Russian oligarch back in 1997.
- In Terminator 3: Rise of the Machines the Terminatrix (T-X), played by Kristanna Loken, hijacks a silver Lexus SC 430 and uses a Nokia 9210 inside the car to dial-up a remote link to a local phone systems server.
- In Bad Company (2002) the special phone used by Chris Rock is the Nokia 9210.
- In Dilemma (Nelly song) music video, singer Kelly Rowland attempts to send a text to her love interest Nelly using Microsoft Excel spreadsheet on a Nokia 9210. The absurdity of this led to online mockery.

== Gallery ==
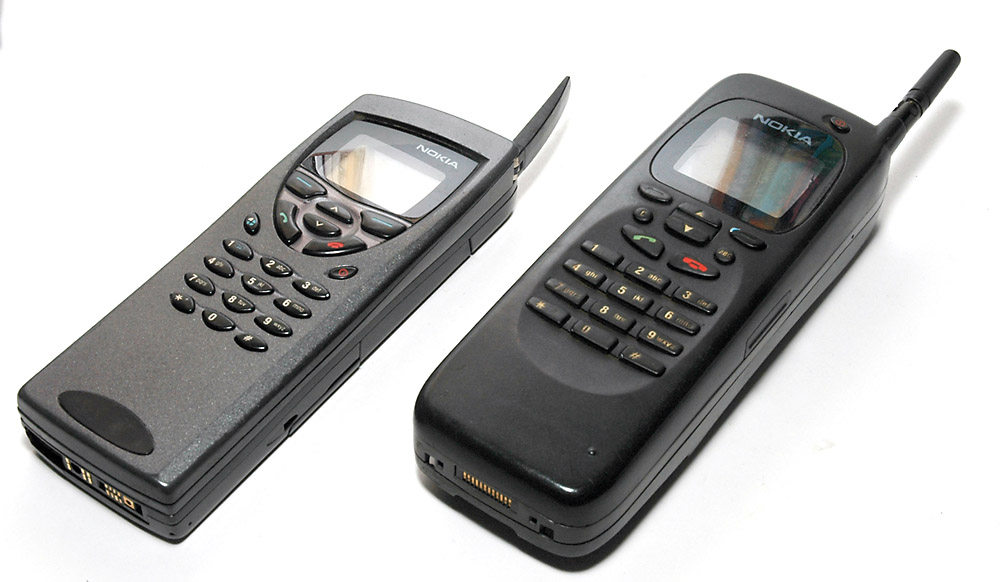
Nokia 9000 Communicator (right)
Nokia 9110 Communicator (left)

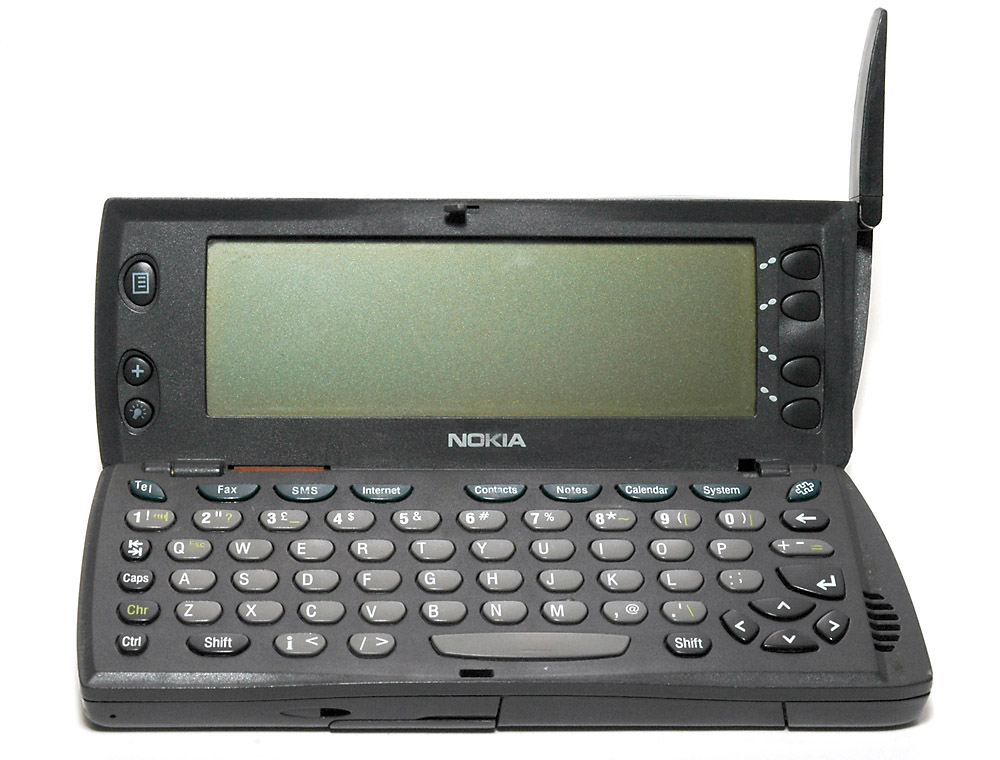
Nokia 9110 Communicator

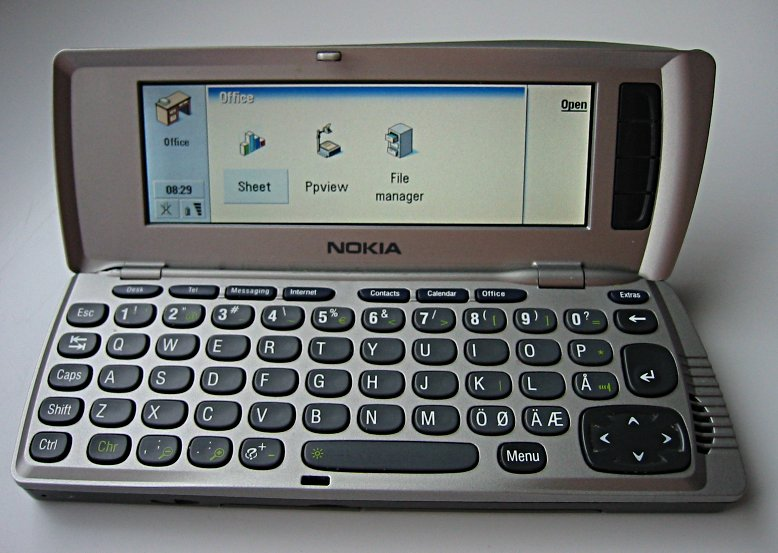
Nokia 9210 Communicator

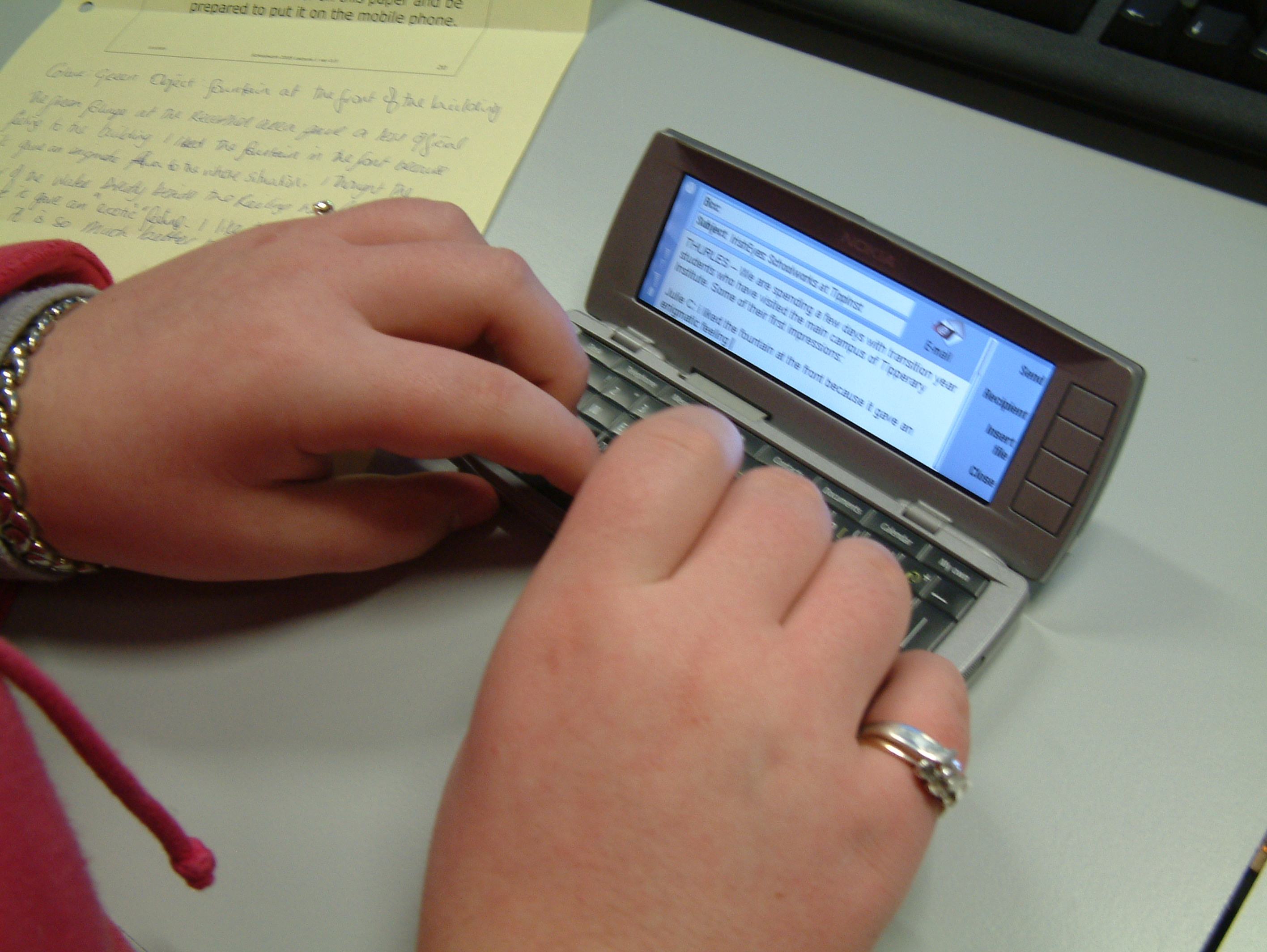
Nokia 9500 Communicator

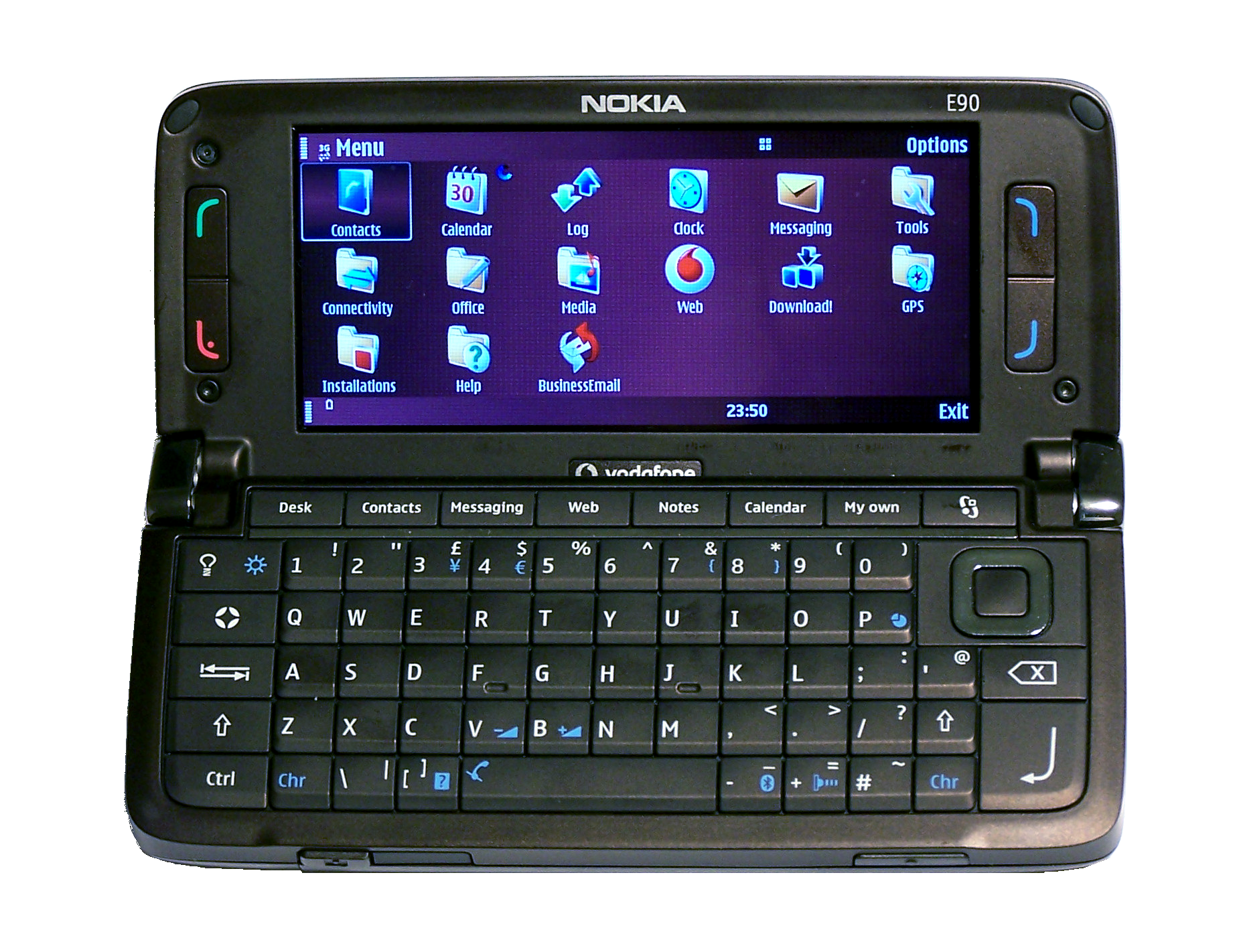
Nokia E90 Communicator

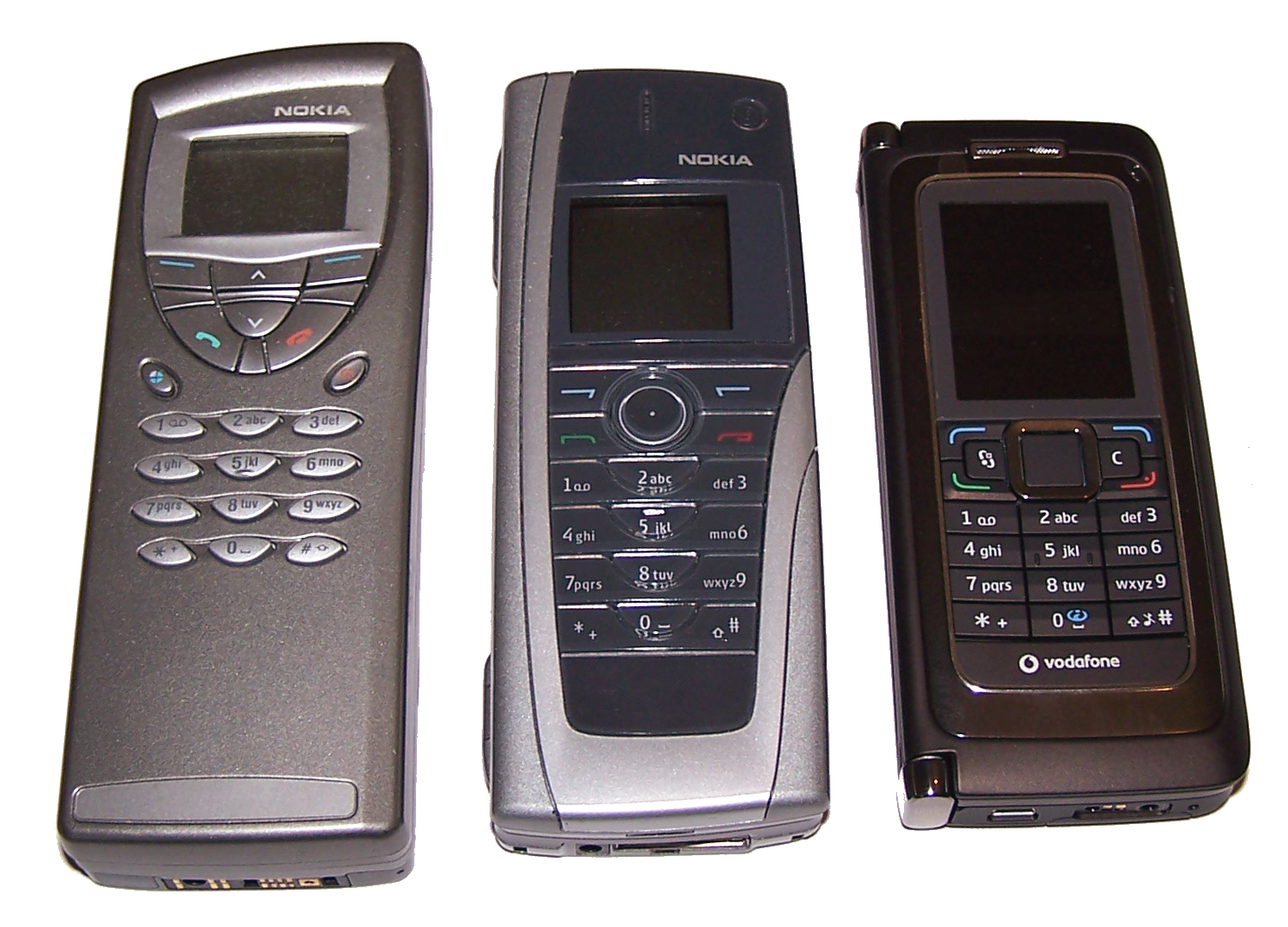
Nokia 9210i, 9500 and E90 Communicators

== See also ==
- "Communicator" (Star Trek)
- Nokia Eseries
- Nokia PC Suite
- OpenSync
- Series 80 (software platform)
- Asus M930w and Toshiba G910 / G920, adopted Nokia's design
- Cosmo Communicator, adopted Nokia's design and name
- List of Nokia products
