= Nokia 9500 Communicator =

Cell phone model

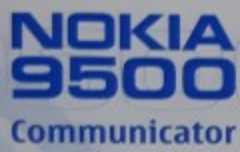

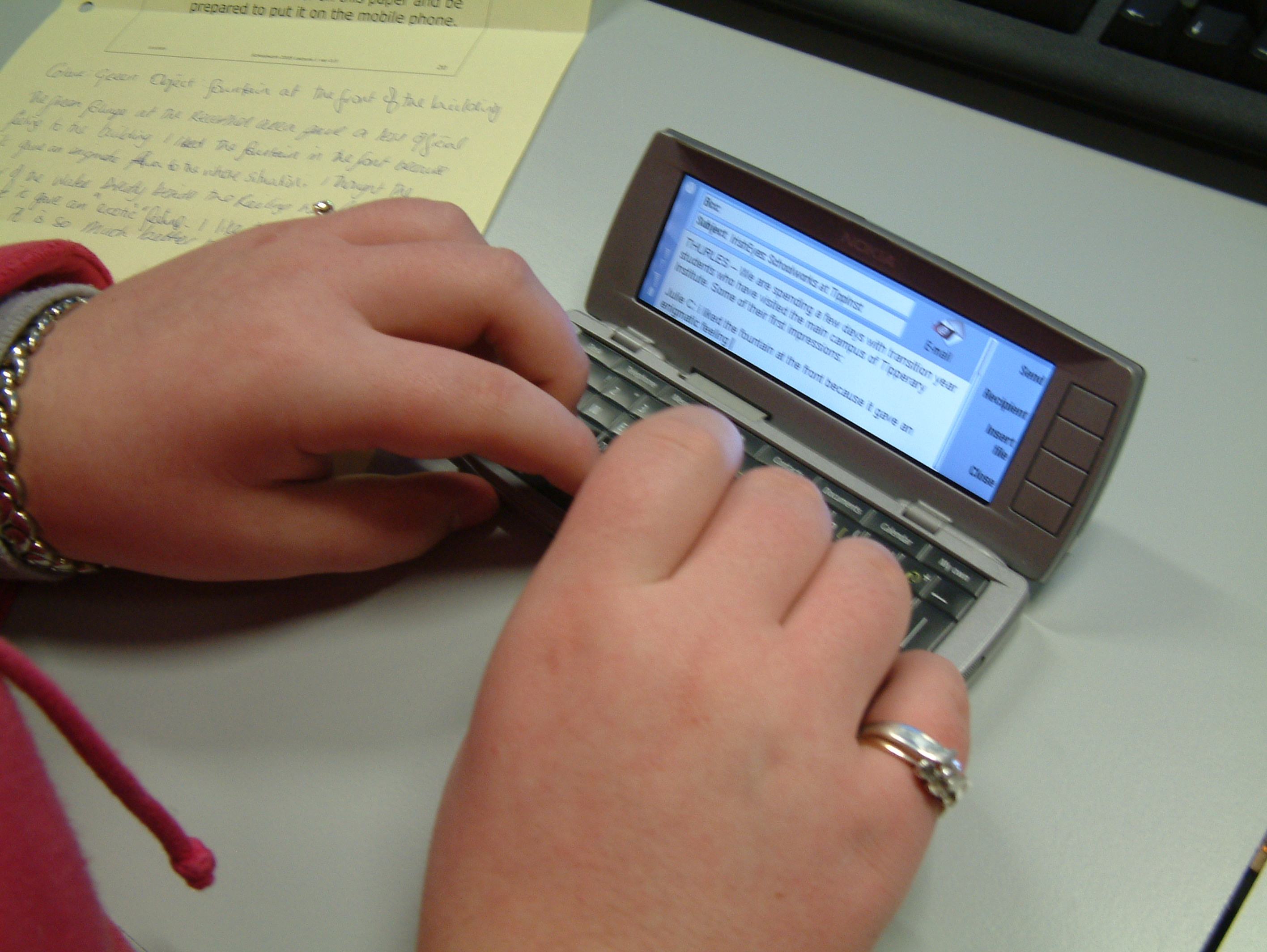
- Manufacturer: Nokia
- Predecessor: Nokia 9210 Communicator
- Successor: Nokia E90 Communicator; Nokia E71; Nokia E75
- Related: Nokia 9300; Nokia E70; Nokia E61
- Compatible networks: GPRS, EDGE
- CPU: TI OMAP 150MHz
- Removable storage: MultiMediaCard
- Connectivity: Bluetooth, IrDA, 802.11b

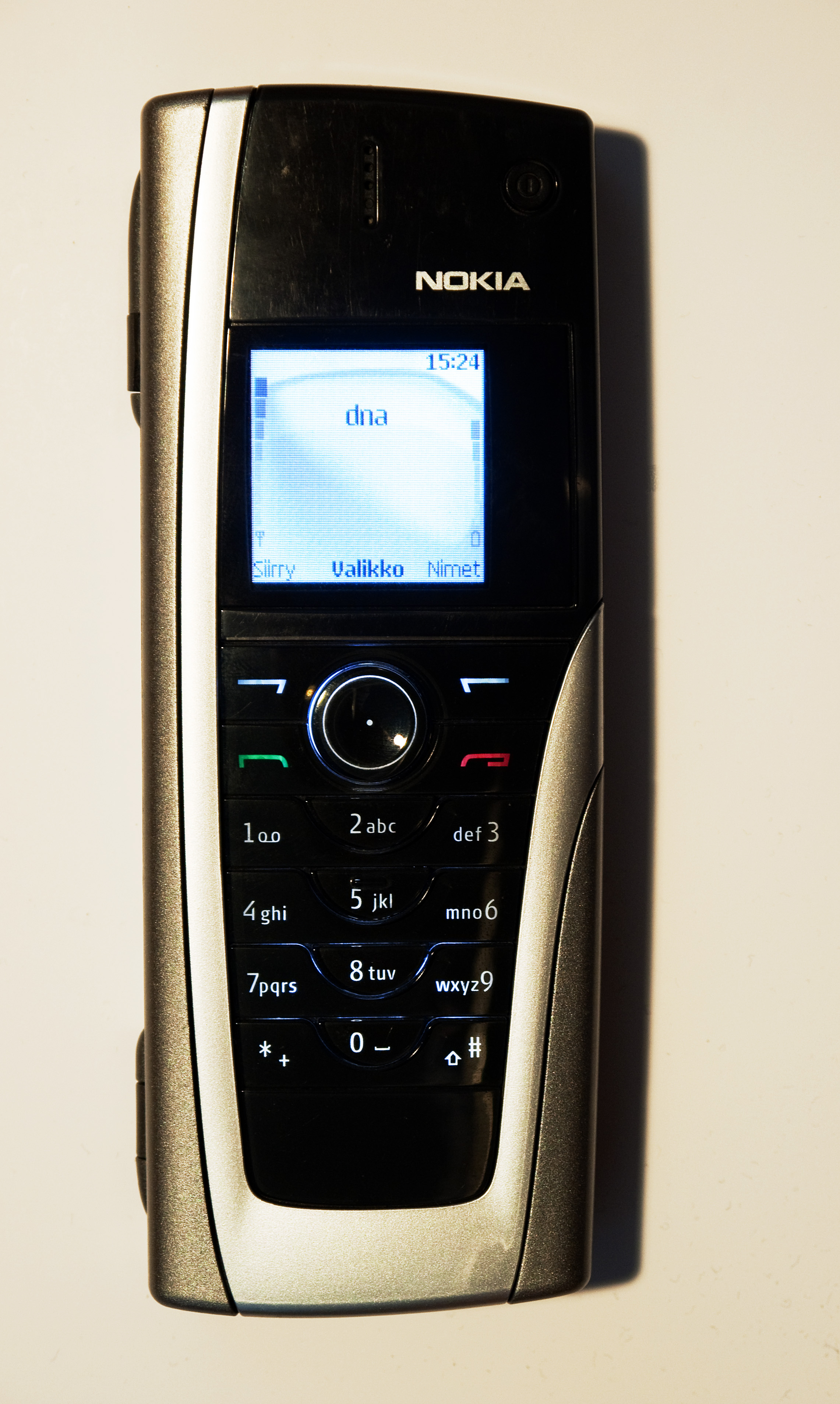
Nokia 9500 closed

Nokia 9500 Communicator is a mobile phone produced by Nokia, introduced on 24 February 2004 and released in November 2004. It runs on the Symbian-based Series 80 platform.

The 9500 is equipped with a 150 MHz Texas Instruments OMAP processor and 64 megabytes of SDRAM. It features two screens – a fully functional interior screen, and a restricted-function external screen, which operates on a stripped-down Series 40 user interface.

Connectivity features of the 9500 include: Bluetooth, infrared, USB, Wi-Fi (Nokia's first device with Wi-Fi), CSD, HSCSD, GPRS and EDGE. It has send and receive fax facilities (without scanner) and multi-account POP3/IMAP email client.

The built-in Web browser, a Nokia-branded version of Opera, is able to render both WAP and HTML Web pages. Like others in the Communicator series, the 9500 has a full QWERTY keyboard.

Built-in software includes a word processor, spreadsheet and presentation program, which are compatible with the Microsoft Office suite equivalents; also featured is an MP3 player. In addition to the software applications provided by Nokia, a large range of third-party software is available; many programs written for older Nokia Communicators are compatible with the 9500 and new software can be written in C++ or OPL.

The 9500 also runs Java ME applications, but some do not make full use of the unusually large and wide screen, so that many existing Java games will run, but only use the top left hand corner of the screen. It supports storage on a Multimedia Card (MMC) of up to 2 GB (on later firmware versions).

The 9500 is only available with 900 MHz, 1800 MHz and 1900 MHz radios. There were many rumors that a U.S. version with 850 MHz radio capability was going to be made, but it never materialized. Nokia was producing simultaneously the 9500 and its related version, the 9300, so they decided to make a U.S. version of the 9300 instead.

== See also ==
- Nokia 9210, predecessor (2002)
- Nokia 9300, a device with similar specs, except smaller and without Wi-Fi and camera.
- Nokia E90 Communicator, successor to the 9500
- List of Nokia products
