= 9300 =

9300 may refer to:

- The year 9300, in the 10th millennium.
- NVIDIA GeForce 9300, a computer graphics card series
- Nokia 9300, a smartphone
