= Nokia E72 =

Cell phone model

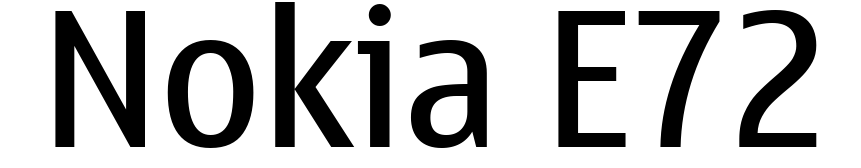

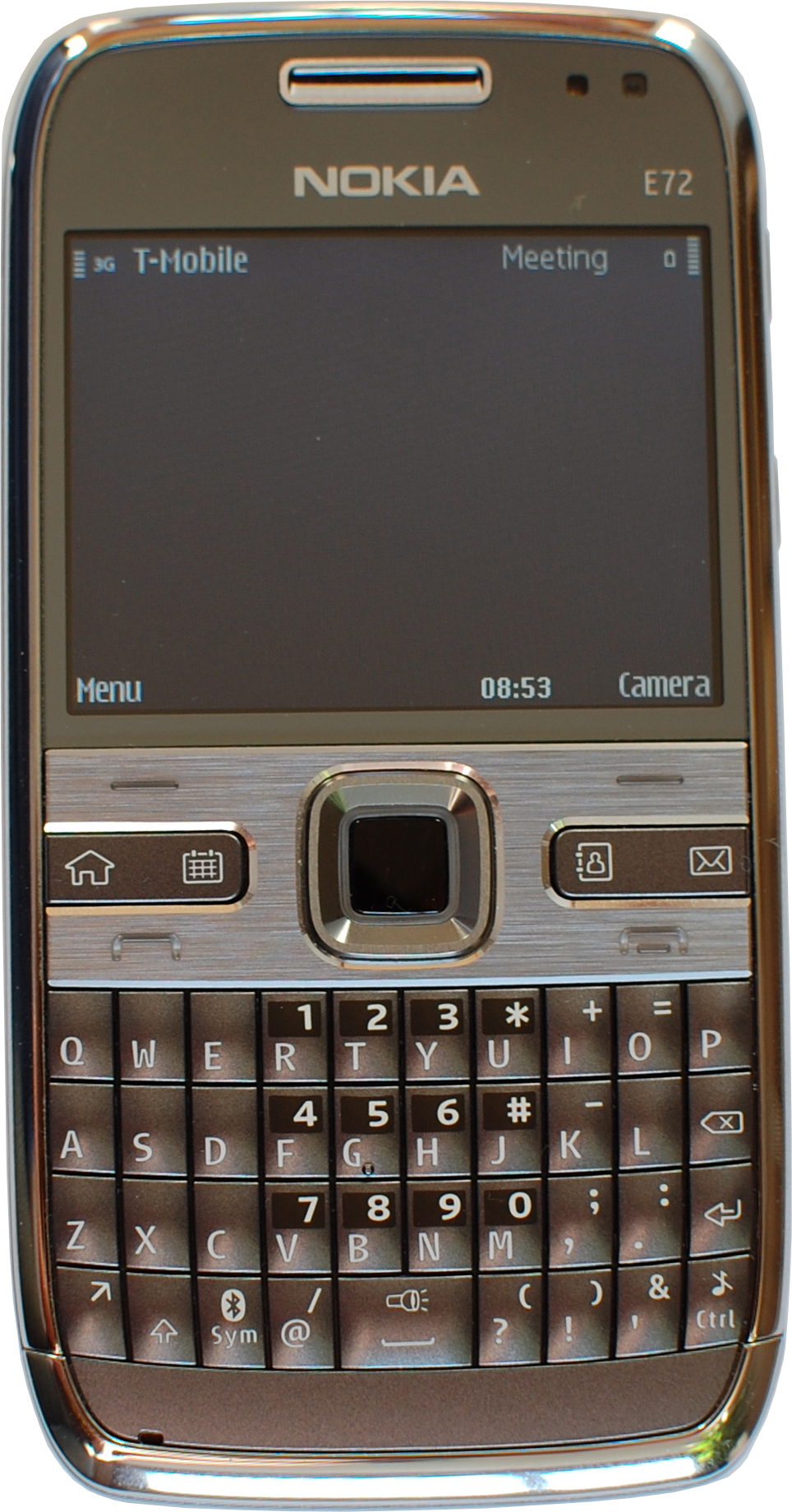
- Manufacturer: Nokia
- Type: Candybar smartphone
- Availability by region: October 2009
- Predecessor: Nokia E71
- Successor: Nokia E6; Nokia E73 Mode
- Related: Nokia E52/E55; Nokia E63; Nokia 6720 classic
- Compatible networks: GSM 800/900/1800/1900 MHz Tri Band UMTS/HSPDA/HSUPA/850/1900/2100 MHz (North American version)
- Form factor: Bar
- Dimensions: 114×59.5×10.1 mm (4.49×2.34×0.40 in)
- Weight: 128 g (5 oz) (with battery)
- Operating system: S60 3rd Edition Feature Pack 2 UI on Symbian OS v9.3
- CPU: 600 MHz ARM11 processor
- Memory: 250 MiB internal user storage ROM: 512 MiB; SDRAM: 128 MiB; ~45 MiB free executable RAM
- Removable storage: MicroSDHC Hot-swappable, support for up to 32 GiB
- Battery: BP-4L, 3.7V 1,500 mAh lithium-polymer
- Rear camera: 5-megapixel (2592 × 1944 pixels) with autofocus and LED flash Video recording in AVI format VGA (640x480)
- Front camera: VGA (0.3 megapixel)
- Display: 320 × 240 px (0.1 megapixels), 2.36 in, up to 16.7 million colours
- Connectivity: WLAN Wi-Fi 802.11 b, g, Integrated & Assisted GPS, Bluetooth 2.0, micro USB, 3.5 mm audio jack
- Data inputs: QWERTY thumb keyboard, optical navigation key
- Other: FOTA (Firmware update over the air) accelerometer sensor ambient light sensor magnetometer sensor digital compass

The Nokia E72 is a smartphone that was marketed as part of Nokia's Eseries range of business-oriented products. The Nokia E72 was announced on June 15, 2009 at the Nokia Connections 2009 event in Singapore. It is the successor to the Nokia E71 and is based on a similar design and form factor, and offers a similar feature set. It has standard features including mobile email, calendar and instant messaging among many others with its Symbian-based S60 3rd Edition Feature Pack 2 operating system. The E72 was manufactured in Finland. It was succeeded by Nokia E6 in 2011.

The Nokia E72 has a new Optical Navi Key feature in addition to the standard D-pad used on many other Nokia devices including the Nokia E71 – this is said to improve the ease of scrolling through menus, emails, web pages, and images as it is an optical sensor in addition to a series of closely spaced buttons. In comparison to its predecessor, the Nokia E72 is said to have a higher level of performance (likely due to the faster 600 MHz ARM processor) and also includes a 5-megapixel auto focusing camera. Other changes and improvements are software-based including changes to the user interface and built-in messaging application among others.

== Firmware ==
The current firmware of this device is 91.004 published on 2 June 2012 (to check the current firmware, one may dial *#0000#).

== Variants ==
The Nokia E73 Mode is a USA feature phone for T-Mobile USA, with support for T-Mobile's UMA service and Band IV support for 3G. It is a different piece of hardware internally from the E72.

A Chinese domestic market variant is Nokia E72i, lacking WiFi connection.

The Vertu Constellation Quest from 2010 is based on the E72 design.

== Features and enhancements from E71 ==
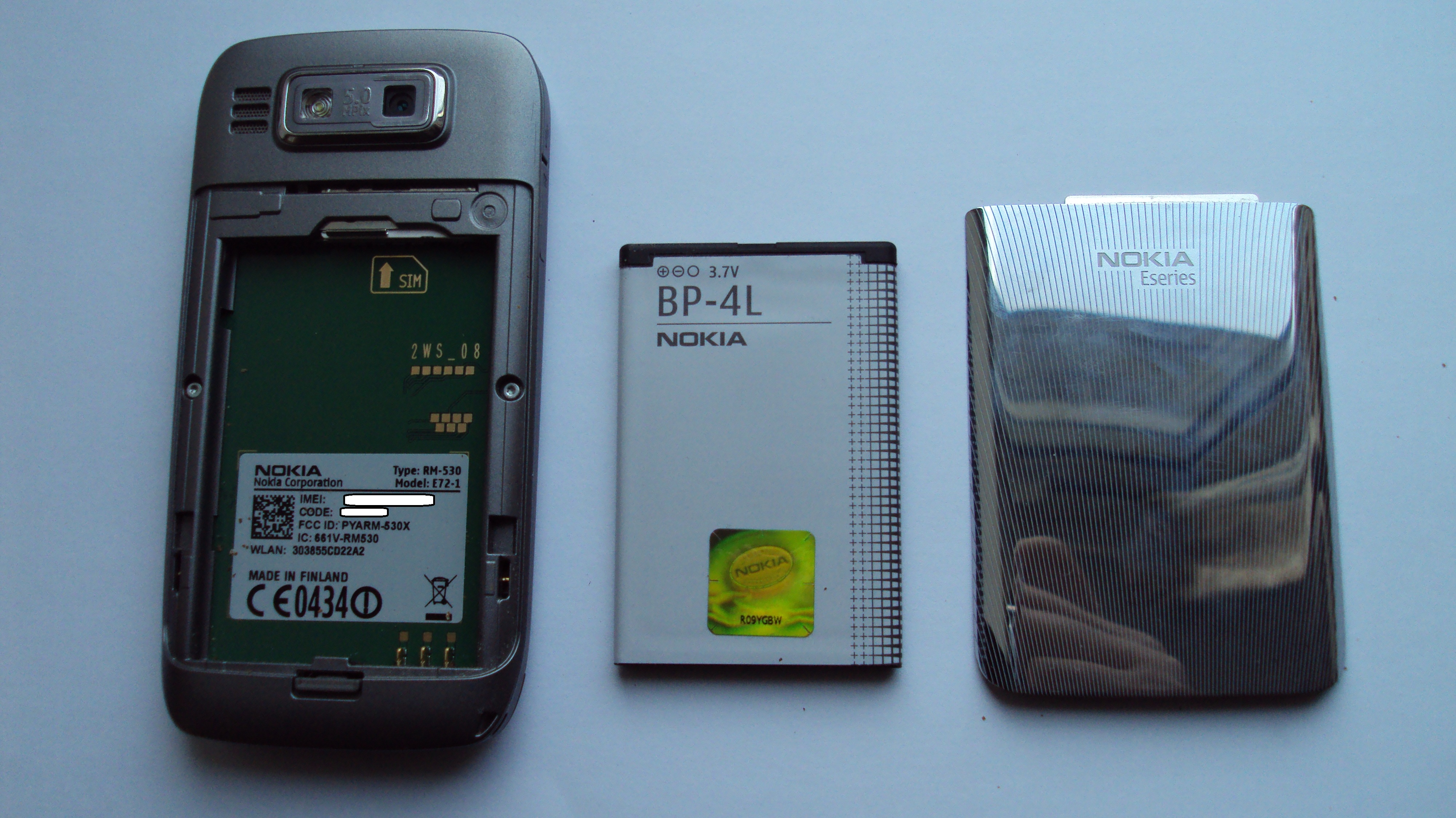
5-megapixel camera, lithium-ion battery and stainless steel cover of the Nokia E72

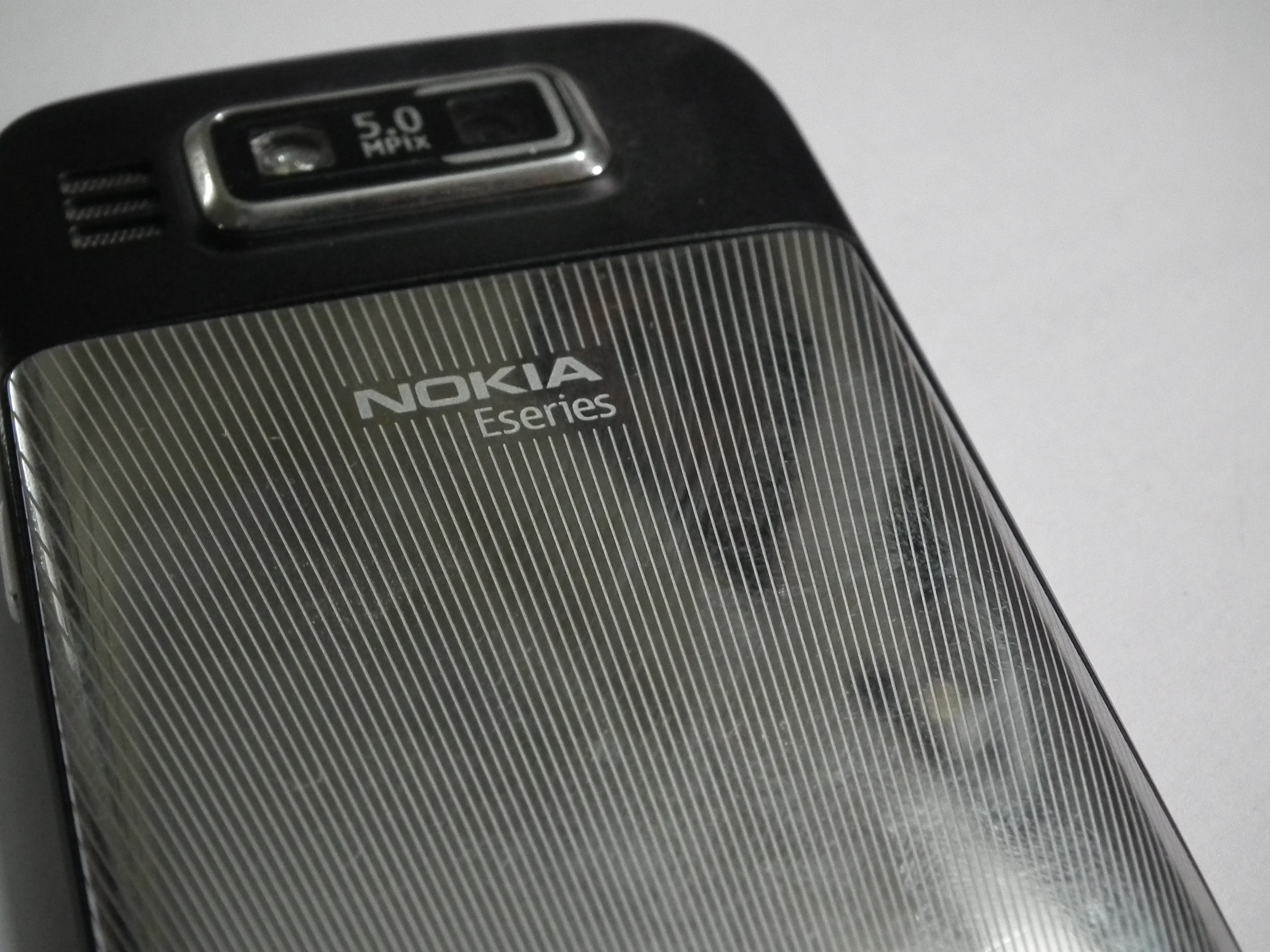
Back

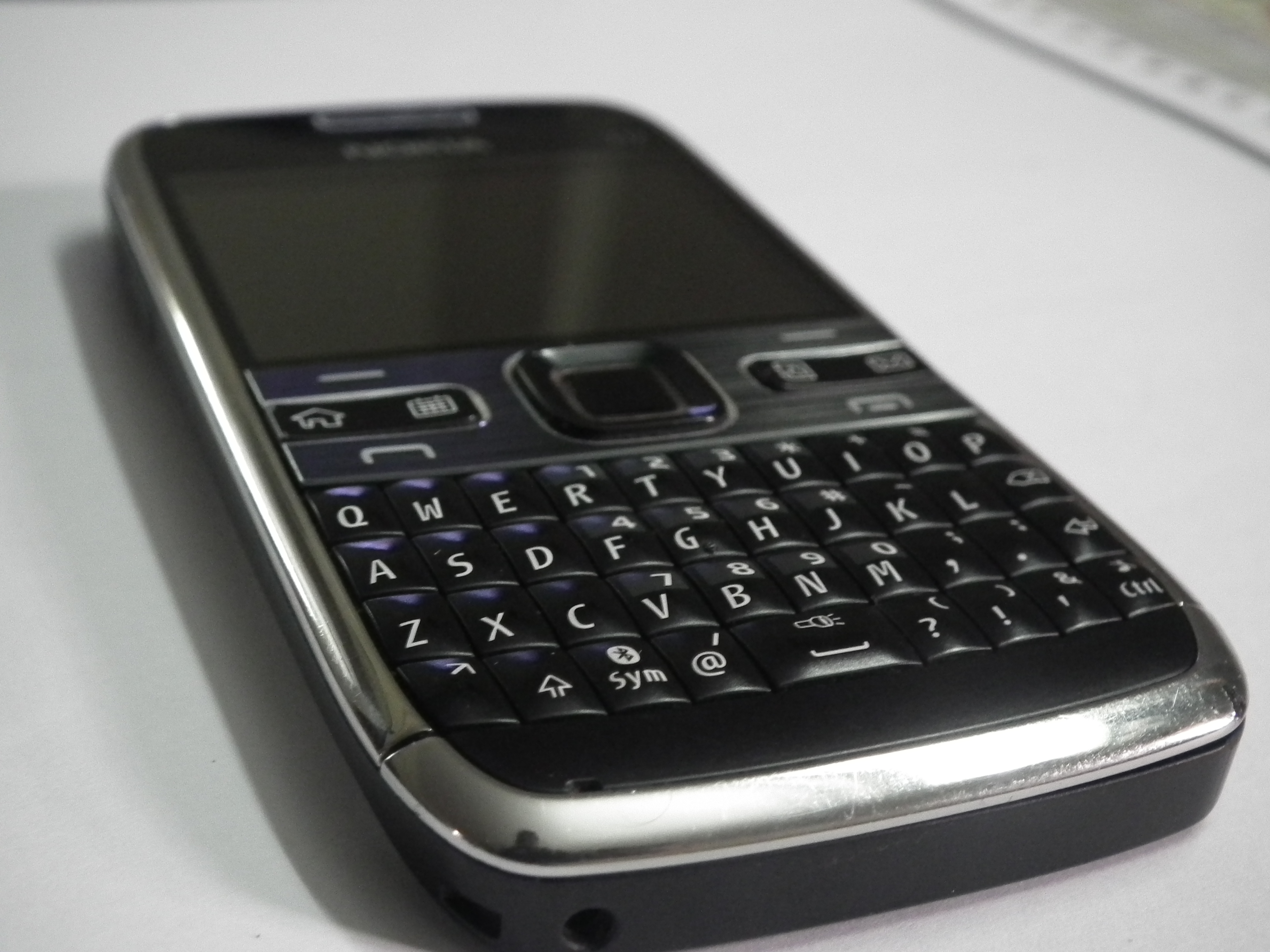
Black E72

=== New features ===
- Symbian OS 9.3, Series 60 v3.2 UI, Feature Pack 2.
- Optical navi key, along with the conventional D-Pad
- 3.5 mm audio jack
- Ovi Maps with free lifetime drive and walk voice assisted navigation
- Lifetime free Nokia Messaging service (discontinued)
- Use of front-facing camera (video call, VGA, QVGA snapshots and QCIF videos for 15 seconds)
- USB charging
- Magnetometer sensor and digital compass
- RDS support
- PictBridge
- uPnP media streaming support (not present on E73)
- UMA (E73)

=== Improvements ===
- Modified design and look compared to E71.
- 3.5 mm jack in contrast to the 2.5 mm jack used in the E71.
- 12 hours of talktime (2G) instead of the E71's 10 hours (2G).
- Tri-band UMTS/HSDPA/HSUPA instead of dual-band
- HSDPA support of up to 10.2 Mbit/s instead of 3.6
- Added HSUPA at 2.0 Mbit/s
- Improved CPU clock speed from 369 MHz to 600 MHz
- Real time Push e-mail HTML
- Improved reception from the E71's fluctuating signal reception
- 5-megapixel camera (up from 3.2)
- VGA 640x480 at 15 frames per second (E72) rather than QVGA 320x240 at 15 frames per second (E71)
- New flashlight feature (it can be activated by holding down the space bar)

== See also ==
- Nokia Eseries
- Nokia E5-00 Reduced-cost version of the E72
- Nokia N72
- Nokia E73 Mode
