= Nokia E73 Mode =

Mobile phone model

- Manufacturer: Nokia
- Type: Smartphone
- Predecessor: Nokia E72
- Compatible networks: 2G, 3G
- Form factor: Bar
- Dimensions: 2.4 inches, 17.8 square-cm (~26.8% screen-to-body ratio)
- Weight: 127.6 g (4.48 oz)
- Operating system: Symbian OS v9.3, Series 60 v3.2
- CPU: 600 MHz ARM11 processor
- Memory: 250 MB internal storage ROM: 512 MiB; SDRAM: 128 MiB; ~45 MiB free executable RAM
- Removable storage: MicroSDHC support for up to 16GiB
- Battery: BP-4L, 3.7V 1,500 mAh lithium-polymer
- Rear camera: 5 Megapixels with autofocus and LED flash
- Front camera: VGA videocall camera
- Display: 320 × 240 pixels, 4:3 ratio (~167 ppi density)
- Connectivity: WLAN Wi-Fi 802.11 b, g, Integrated & Assisted GPS, Bluetooth 2.0, micro USB, 3.5 mm audio jack
- Data inputs: QWERTY thumb keyboard, optical navigation key

The Nokia E73 Mode is a mobile phone from the Nokia Eseries range manufactured by Nokia. It is the successor to the Nokia E72. The Nokia E73 Mode is an enterprise-based smartphone (as all Nokia Eseries devices) and has standard features including mobile email, calendar and instant messaging among many others like the Nokia E72.

== See also ==
- Nokia E72
