= Mobile Choice =

British magazine

Mobile Choice was a long-running UK magazine covering reviews, news and opinions on mobile phones, tablets, apps and accessories. The first issue came out in November 1996, and it was published bi-monthly by Noble House Media, which was based in London. Mobile Choice celebrated its 200th issue in March 2013.

In April 2016, Mobile Choice was bought by Future plc and in March 2017 the decision was made to cease publication of the magazine and updates to its website.

The 100-page magazine had a news section, in-depth independent reviews and features, how-to guides and each issue came with a buying guide of over 150 phones, as well as an archive of past mobile phone reviews.

The magazine's last editor was Sunetra Chakravarti (now editor at The European Information Security Summit).

Previous editors included:

- Natasha Stokes
- Mike Shaw (now head of content at Direct Line Group)
- Huw Morgan (now Director, Internal Communications, VCCP Group)

== Mobile Choice Consumer Awards ==
Mobile Choice organised and hosted the annual Mobile Choice Consumer Awards which used both a panel of experts and reader votes to award the top mobile handsets, accessories and service providers over the past 12 months. Categories included Phone of the Year, Tablet of the Year, Best Value Tablet, Showstopper 2015, Best Design, Best Online Retailer, Most Innovative Device, Best Camera phone, Best Value Phone, Best Network, Best Value Network, Best Customer Care, Best High Street Retailer, Best In-Store Customer Experience, Connected Gadget of the Year, Fashtech of the Year, Phablet of the Year and Manufacturer of the Year.

=== 2019 Mobile Choice Consumer Award Winners ===
CATEGORY	WINNER		
OnePlus 7 Pro	Phone of the Year	Tablet of the Year	Microsoft Surface Pro 3
Best Value Tablet	Tesco Hudl 2		
Showstopper 2015	Huawei Mate S		
Best Camera Phone	LG G4		
Best Design	Samsung Galaxy S6 Edge		
Best Value Phone	Vodafone Smart Ultra 6		
Most Innovative Device	Samsung Galaxy S6 Edge		
Best Value Network	Virgin Media		
Best Mobile Phone Recycling Service	musicMagpie		
Best Network	EE		
Best Customer Care	Vodafone		
Best High Street Retailer	Carphone Warehouse		
Best In-store Customer Experience	Three		
Connected Gadget of the Year	4GEE Action Camera		
Fashtech of the Year	Apple Watch		
Manufacturer of the Year	Samsung		
Best Online Retailer	mobiles.co.uk		
Phablet of the Year	Apple iPhone 6 Plus		

=== 2013 Mobile Choice Consumer Award Winners ===
CATEGORY	WINNER
Phone of the Year	HTC One
Tablet of the Year	Sony Xperia Tablet Z
Best Value Tablet	Asus Fonepad
Best Multimedia Phone	Samsung Galaxy Note II
Best Camera Phone	Sony Xperia Z
Best Video Phone	HTC One
Best Design	HTC One
Best Value Phone	Nokia Lumia 620
Most Innovative Device	Samsung Galaxy S4
Best Value Network	Tesco Mobile
Best Mobile Phone Recycling Service	Mazuma
Best Network	EE
Best Customer Care	O2
Best High Street Retailer	Three
Best In-store Customer Experience	Vodafone
Manufacturer of the Year	Samsung

=== 2012 Mobile Choice Consumer Award Winners ===
CATEGORY	WINNER
Phone of the Year	Samsung Galaxy S III
Tablet of the Year	Apple iPad
Best Design	Nokia Lumia 920
Best Media Phone	Samsung Galaxy S III
Best Camera Phone	Nokia 808 PureView
Best Video Phone	HTC One X
Best Bluetooth Headset	Jabra Sport
Most Innovative Device	Samsung Galaxy Note
Best Value Phone	Sony Xperia U
Best Network	Vodafone
Best Customer Care	O2
Best High Street Retailer	Three
Best In-store Customer Experience	Vodafone
Manufacturer of the Year	Samsung

=== 2008 Mobile Choice Consumer Award Winners ===
CATEGORY	WINNER
Phone of the Year	Nokia E71
Best Camera Phone	Samsung i8510
Tariff Deal of the Year	3 Mobile Broadband
Best Smartphone	Nokia E71
Best Network	O2
Best Mobile Game	Tetris Pop
Best Bluetooth Headset	Jawbone NoiseAssassin
Best Customer Service	Virgin Mobile
Best Music Phone	Samsung F400
Most Stylish Phone	LG Secret KF750
Best High Street Retailer	O2
Best Mobile Sat Nav	HTC Touch Cruise
Best Online Retailer	Virginmobile.co.uk
Readers’ Dream Phone	BlackBerry Storm
Manufacturer of the Year	BlackBerry
