= Nokia 9000 Communicator =

Mobile phone model

Nokia 9000/9000i Communicator
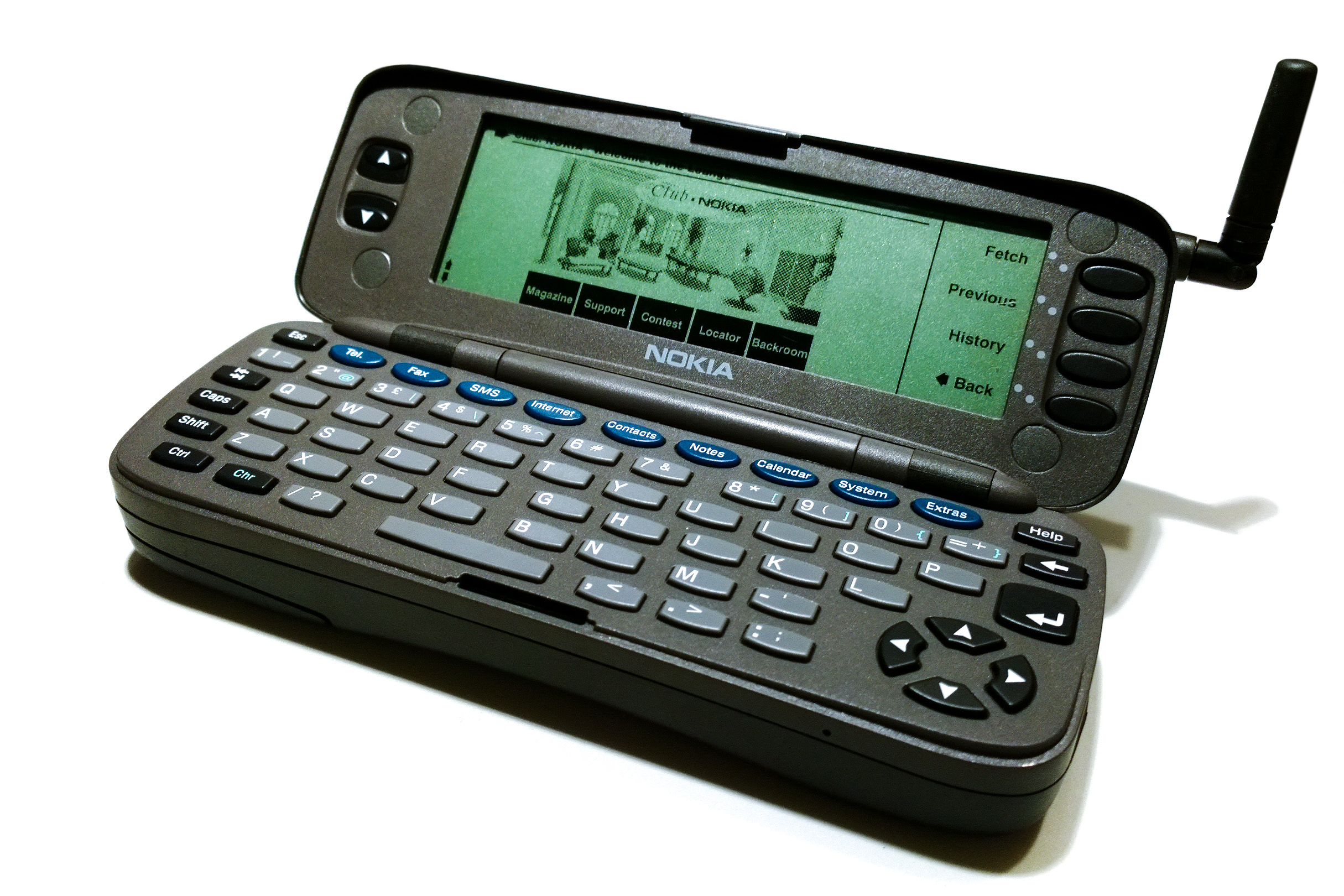
- Manufacturer: Nokia
- First released: August 15, 1996; 30 years ago
- Availability by region: Discontinued
- Predecessor: Nokia 2170 (9000/9000i)
- Successor: Nokia 9210 Communicator (9110); Nokia 9210i Communicator (9110i)
- Related: List of Nokia products
- Compatible networks: GSM-900
- Dimensions: 173 mm × 64 mm × 38 mm (6.8 in × 2.5 in × 1.5 in)
- Weight: 397 g (14.0 oz)
- Operating system: GEOS (on the PDA side)
- CPU: Intel 386
- Memory: No
- Removable storage: No
- Display: Monochrome partly-graphic LCD

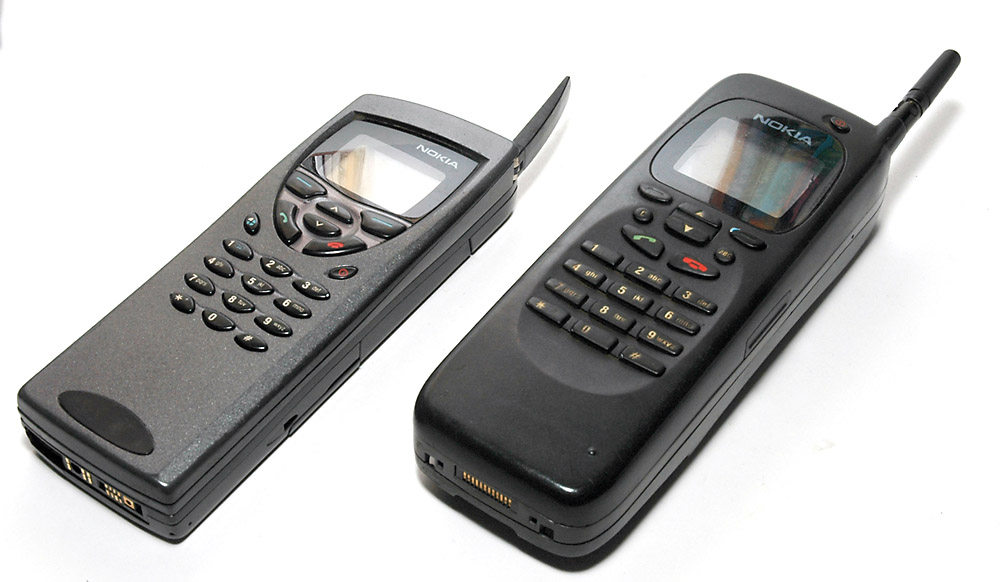
The Nokia 9000 on the right and its 1997 upgraded model 9110 on the left.

The Nokia 9000 Communicator mobile device is the first product in Nokia's Communicator series, announced at CeBIT 1996 and introduced into the market on five months later, 15 August 1996. It is powered by a 24 MHz Intel i386 CPU, with 8 MB of memory, divided between applications (4 MB), program memory (2 MB) and user data (2 MB), running PEN/GEOS 3.0.

The Communicator, with its digital GSM cellular telephone, was one of the earliest smartphones on the market, after the IBM Simon in 1994 and the HP OmniGo 700LX, a DOS-based palmtop PC with integrated cradle for the Nokia 2110 cellular mobile phone, announced in late 1995 and shipped in August 15, 1996.

The Communicator was highly advanced at the time, featuring sending and receiving e-mail and fax via its CSD (Circuit Switched Data) modem, to transmit data over the GSM network at a bitrate of 9.6 kbit/s, printing documents using its IrDA port, and it also had a web browser and business programs. It is formed of a clamshell design that opens up to reveal a monochrome LCD with a 640 × 200 resolution and a full QWERTY keyboard similar to a Psion PDA, and weighing 397 grams (14.0 oz). It was priced £1,000 in the UK upon launch (equivalent to £2,000 in 2025).

== Specifications ==
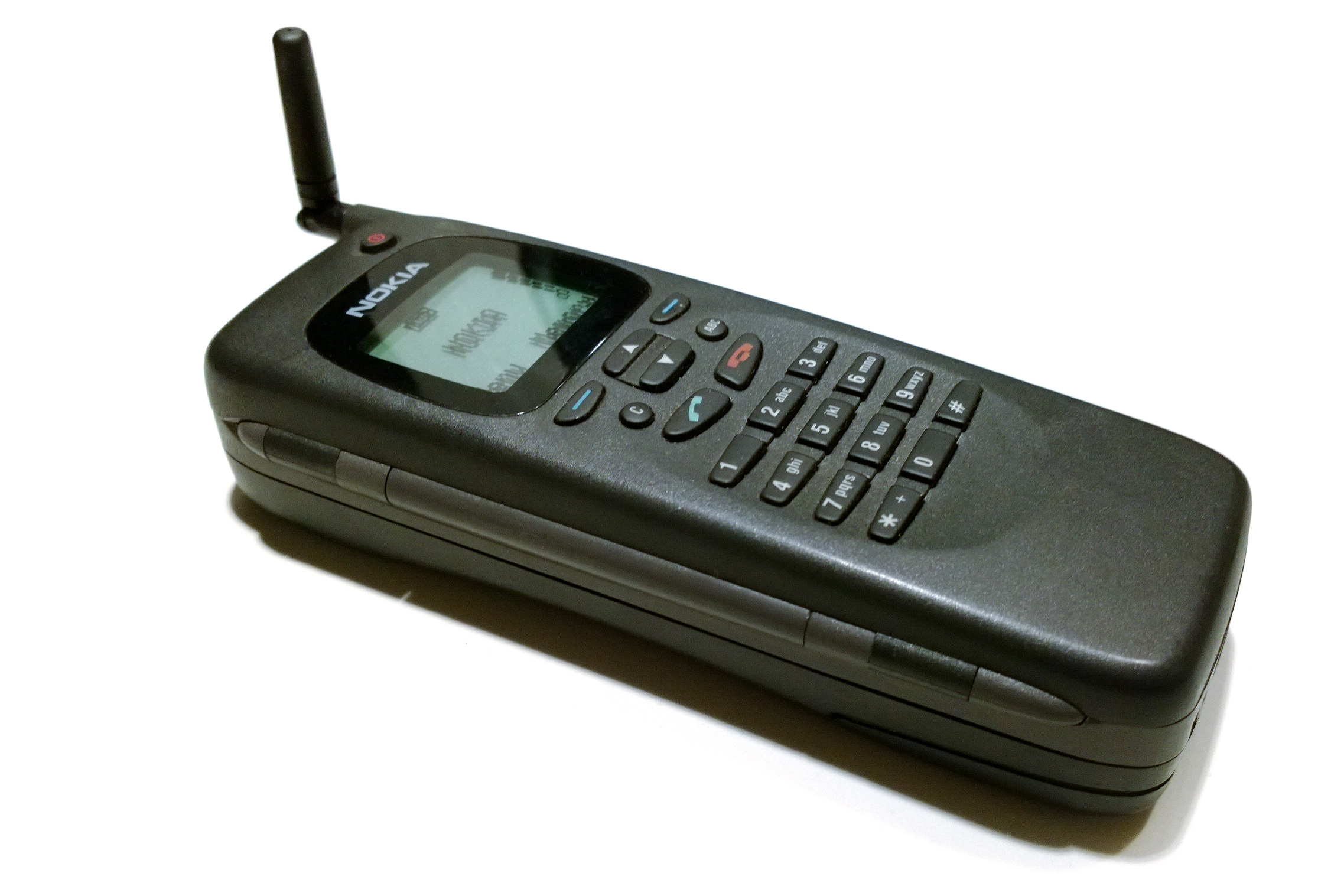
Nokia 9000 Communicator closed.

- Operating system: GEOS (running on top of ROM-DOS) on the PDA side
- Main applications: Fax, short messages, email, Wireless imaging: digital camera connectivity, Smart messaging, TextWeb, Web browser, Serial Terminal, Telnet, Contacts, Notes, Calendar, Calculator, world time clock, Composer.
- Display: 640 × 200 Pixels
- Size: 158 mm × 56 mm × 27 mm
- Weight: 253 g
- Processor: Embedded AMD Élan SC450 Am486 processor at 33 MHz
- Memory: 8 MB total, 4 MB Operating System and applications, 2 MB program execution, 2 MB user data storage, MMC card.

== Reception and legacy ==
Then-CEO of Nokia, Jorma Ollila, said in 2012 regarding the device: "We were five years ahead."

=== Awards ===
The Nokia 9000 Communicator received several awards including:

- GSM World Award (for innovation) at GSM World Conference 1997
- Best Technological Advance by Mobile News UK
- Best New Product 1997 by Business Week magazine

=== Successors ===
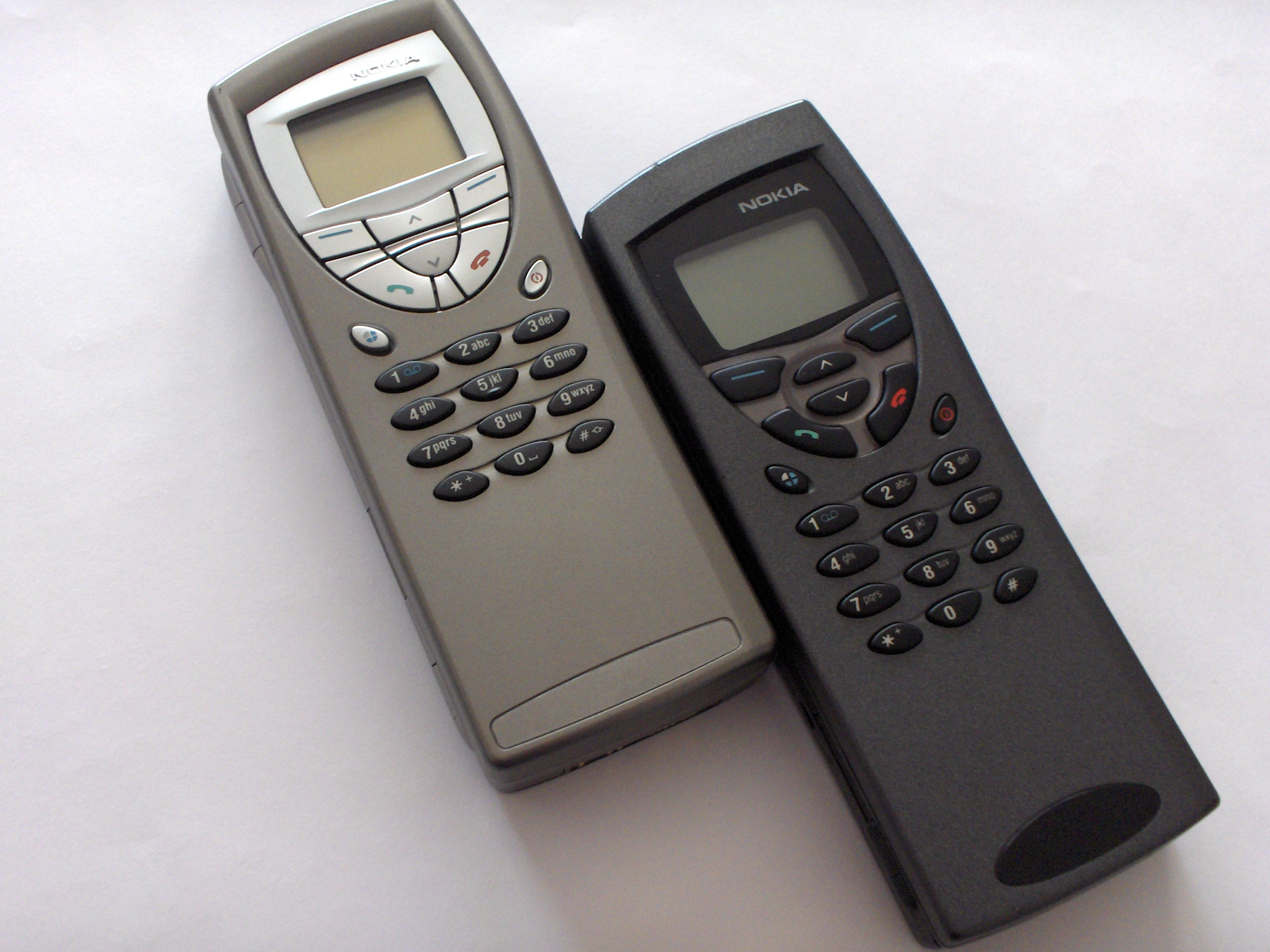
The Nokia 9110 on the right and 9210 on the left.

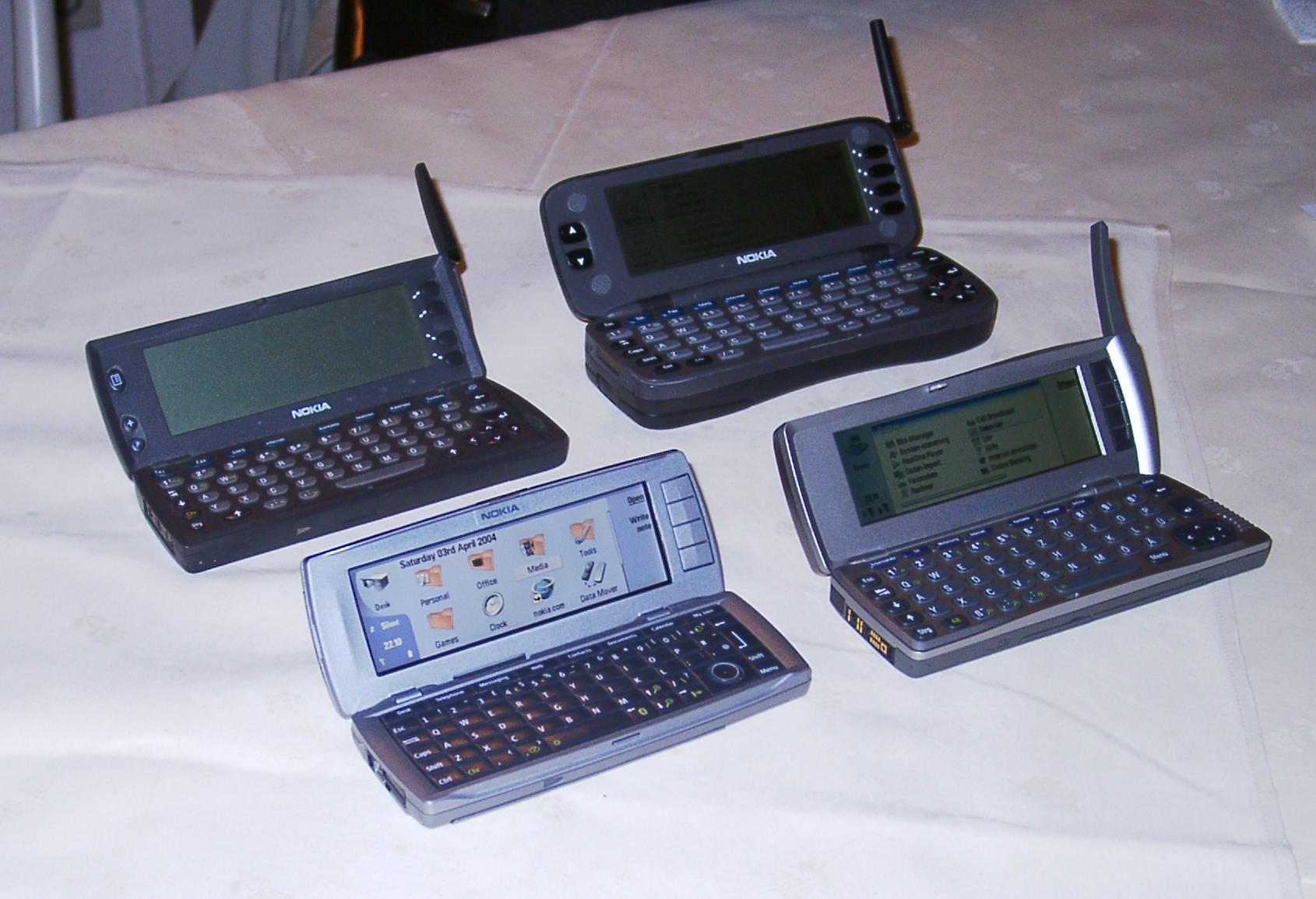
All four Nokia Communicator phones, side-by-side, opened.

The Nokia 9110 Communicator is the updated model of the Nokia 9000 Communicator in the Communicator series. Its biggest change from the 9000 was that it weighed much less, but also had a newer i486-based processor. It was introduced in 1997 and produced until 2000 with the introduction of Nokia 9210 Communicator which introduced a wide TFT colour internal screen, 32-bit ARM9-based RISC CPU at 52 MHz, 16 MB of internal memory, enhanced web abilities and most importantly saw the operating system change to the Symbian operating system. The 9210i launched in 2002 increased the internal memory to 40 MB, video streaming and flash 5 support for the web browser.

The 9xxx Communicators introduced features which later evolved into smartphones.

== In popular culture ==
The Nokia 9000 is used by Val Kilmer when he played Simon Templar in the 1997 remake of The Saint, and by Anthony Hopkins and Chris Rock in the action comedy Bad Company.

The phone is also mentioned in Bret Easton Ellis' book Glamorama.
