= Nokia E90 Communicator =

Smartphone model

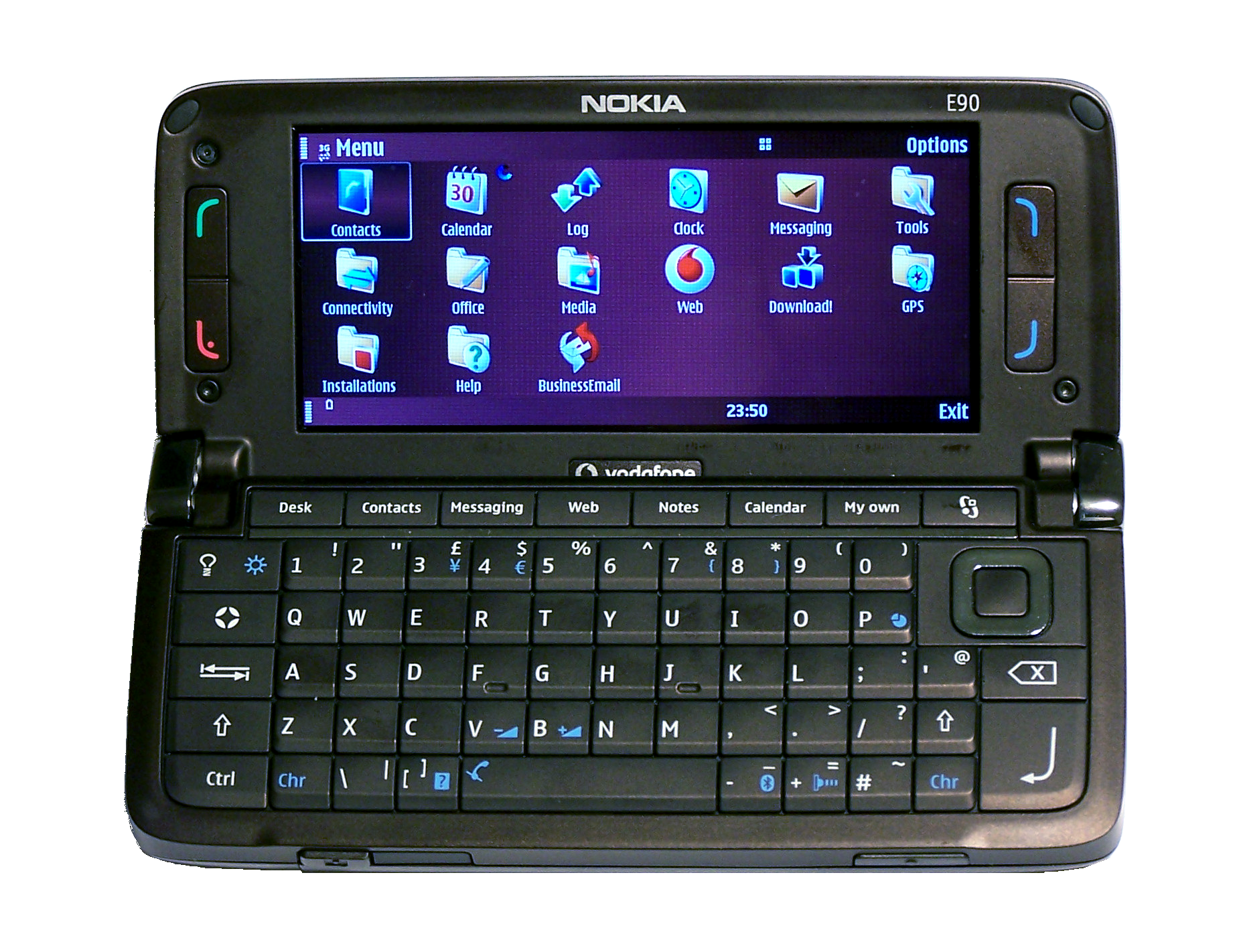
- Predecessor: Nokia 9500 Communicator
- Successor: Nokia N97/N97 Mini; Nokia E75; Nokia E7-00
- Compatible networks: WCDMA 2100; HSDPA; GSM 850/900/1800/1900
- Dimensions: 132×57×20 mm (5.20×2.24×0.79 in)
- Weight: 210 g (7 oz)
- Memory: 256 MB Internal NAND flash 128 MB RAM (80–90 MB user accessible)
- Display: Main display: 800 × 352 pixels, 4-inch, with 16.7 million colours Cover display: 240 × 320 pixels, 2 inch, with 16 million colours
- Connectivity: Bluetooth 2.0; USB 2.0 Compliant; Wi-Fi; IrDA

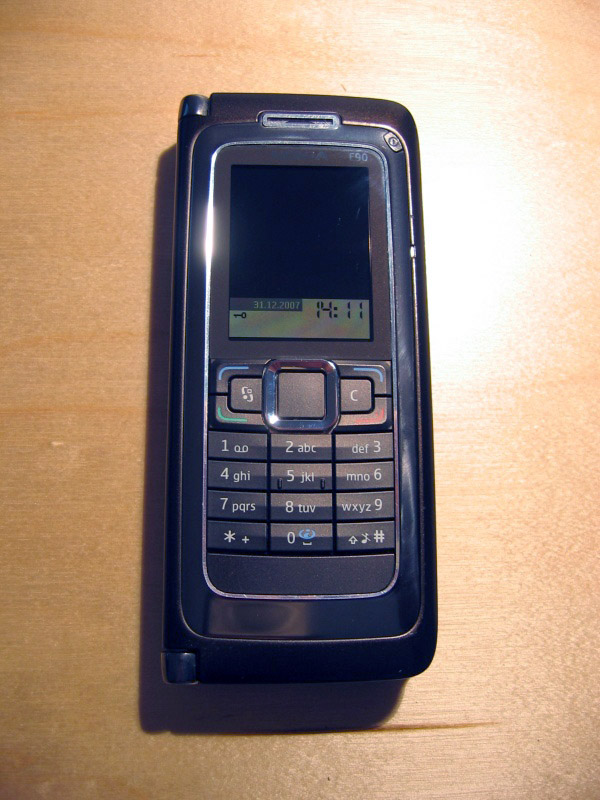
Nokia E90, when closed

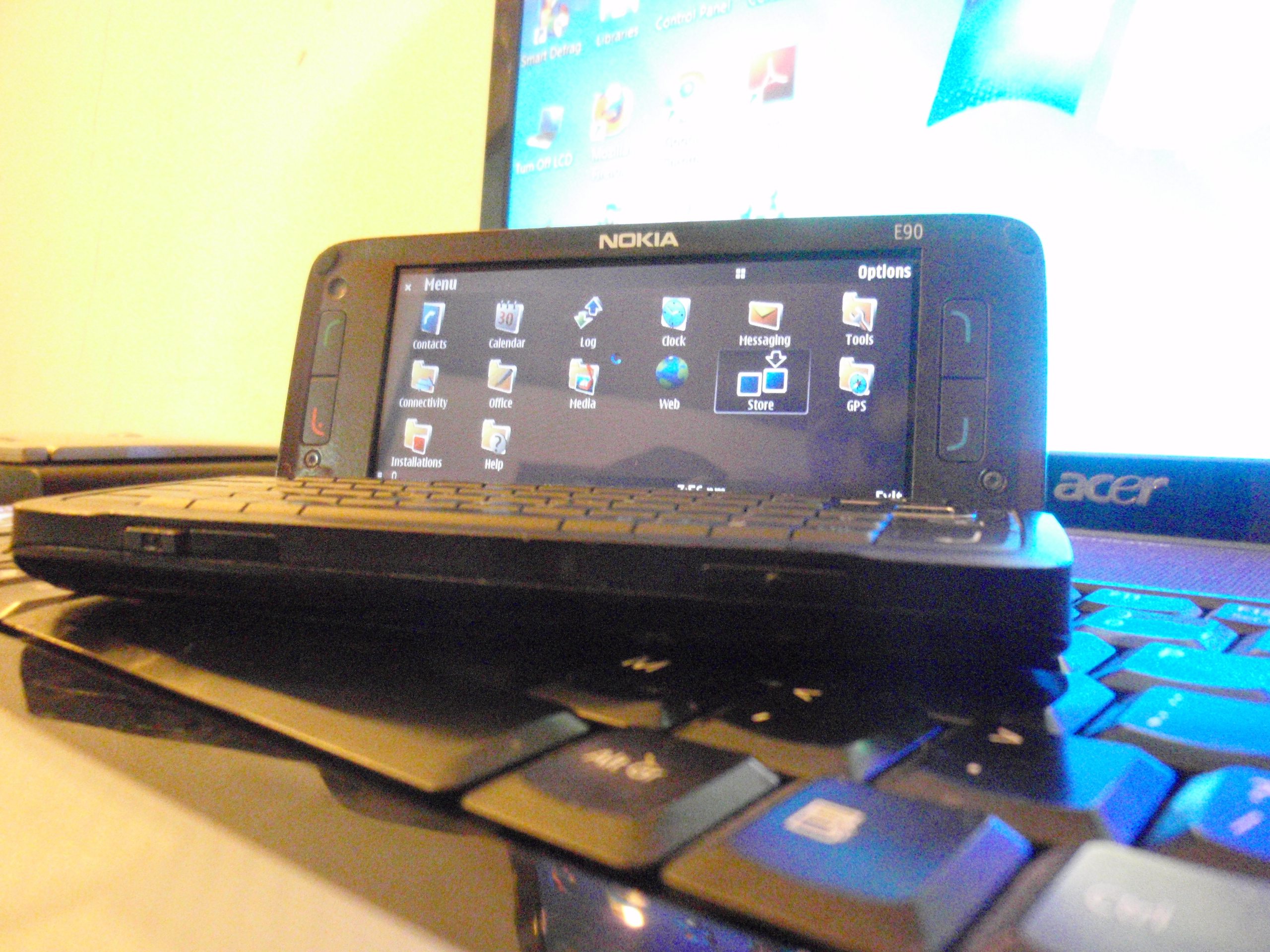

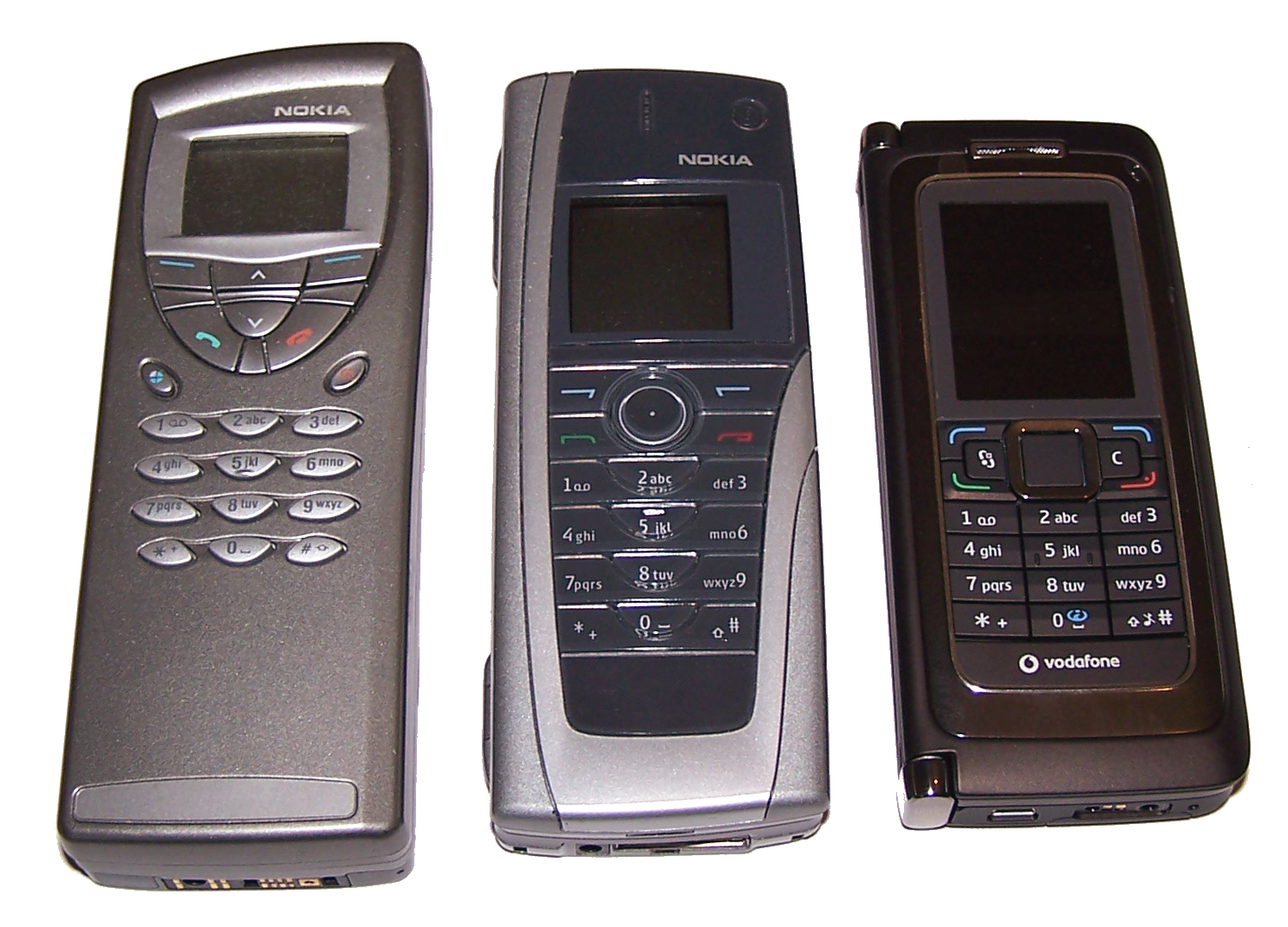
Nokia 9210i, 9500 and E90 Communicators

Nokia E90 Communicator is a high-end 3G smartphone from Nokia, the fifth generation and final Communicator, also part of the Eseries. It was announced on 11 February 2007 at the 3GSM show in Barcelona. It succeeded the Nokia 9500 Communicator as the company's flagship business-oriented device. Its clamshell form and design are reminiscent of older palmtop computers.

Unlike its predecessors, the E90 runs on the S60 platform of Symbian OS (3rd Edition Feature Pack 1 and v9.2 respectively). Previous Communicators meanwhile have been based on either GeOS or Symbian-based Series 80. The move to the common S60 was essential for software compatibility, but it did get rid of some exclusive Series 80 UI behaviours. The E90 is also the first Communicator to have UMTS/HSDPA connectivity and integrated GPS. It features OSGi and eRCP, Eclipse RCP for embedded systems.

The first Nokia E90 unit was sold in an auction in Jakarta, Indonesia on 17 May 2007 for Rp. 45,000,000 (5,000 US$), which was sold to Hartono Gunawan, an Indonesian businessman. Indonesia being one of the largest market share for Nokia's communicator series is cited as a reason for the unit's first launch location.

Early user-feedback and reviews highlighted a defect in the microphone of the Communicator. Nokia initially denied the existence of the defect, but Nokia Europe later acknowledged it in the Q3 earnings report released on 18 October 2007, and stated that the issue had been fully resolved.

The replacement of the QWERTY-ridden interface of Series 80 with the S60 software, which is designed to be used with one thumb, was criticised by some people.

The Communicator's firmware version 7.40.1.2, released in late October 2007, added support for A-GPS and improved GPS performance. This version also upgraded the Maps application. As of June 2009, the Communicator's most recent firmware version is 400.34.93. The free navigation program Ovi Maps is also available for this Communicator (currently just without the free navigation itself).

== Specification sheet ==
(Source)

Platform
Operating System	Symbian OS v9.2 S60 Platform, 3rd Edition, Feature Pack 1
CPU	ARM11 (OMAP2420 @ 330 MHz)
RAM (built in)	128 MB shared
Expandable memory	Originally stated as 2 GB maximum- this has now been changed to 4 GB on the Nokia website specifications. microSD/microSDHC hot-swappable . However, 16 GB has been observed to work . Tested working with 32 GB
Phone Features
Messaging	SMS, MMS, Email (IMAP4, POP3, SMTP), Instant Messaging
Voice Recognition	Yes
Speakerphone	Yes
Video calls	Yes (QCIF camera)
Push to talk	Yes
Vibration	Yes
Call log	Yes (maximum of 30 days)
Connectivity
GSM	Yes (Quadband 850/900/1800/1900 MHz)
CDMA	Yes (WCDMA 2100 MHz with simultaneous voice and packet data)
3G	Yes (UMTS 2100 with HSDPA of 3.6 Mbit/s).
GPRS	Yes
EDGE	Yes
WLAN	Yes (Wi-Fi 802.11b/g)
VOIP	Yes
GPS	Yes (integrated)
FM radio	Yes (requires included headset)
Bluetooth	Yes (v2.0 with Enhanced Data Rate & A2DP)
Infrared	Yes
USB	Yes (v2.0 miniUSB)
Fax	No
BlackBerry	Yes (with BlackBerry Connect v4.0 Software, including over the air activation)
Misc.
Offline mode	Yes, However Bluetooth and WiFi may be switched on independently.
Office Suite	Quickoffice (Microsoft Office compatible)
Web browser	WAP 2.0, xHTML, HTML (limited Adobe Flash support)
Java support	Yes (MIDP 2.0, CLDC 1.1)
PDF viewer	Yes (Adobe Acrobat Reader LE 1.5.0)
GPS Integration	Nokia Maps; Google Maps; Garmin
Camera	3.2 megapixels (with autofocus and LED flash), video at (up to) VGA (640 × 480), up to 30 frame/s
Video player	Yes (built-in RealPlayer)
Displays
Exterior screen	TFT, 16M colours, 240 × 320 pixels, 2 inch
Internal screen	TFT, 16.7M colours, 800 × 352 pixels, 4 inch
Battery
Removable battery	Yes
Battery Type	BP-4L, Li-Ion 1500 mAh
Stand-by time	Up to 14 days
Talk time	Up to 5.8 hours
Physical
Form factor	Clamshell with full QWERTY keyboard
Dimensions	132 × 57 × 20 mm
Weight	210 gram

- The Nokia E90 does not support fax as fax services are not included in the 3G Specifications. It does however support fax through Content Beamer application.
- Supports Microsoft Exchange email via the Nokia "Mail for Exchange" software application. This program does not support folders or native HTML mail.
