= Nokia 9210 Communicator =

Cell phone model

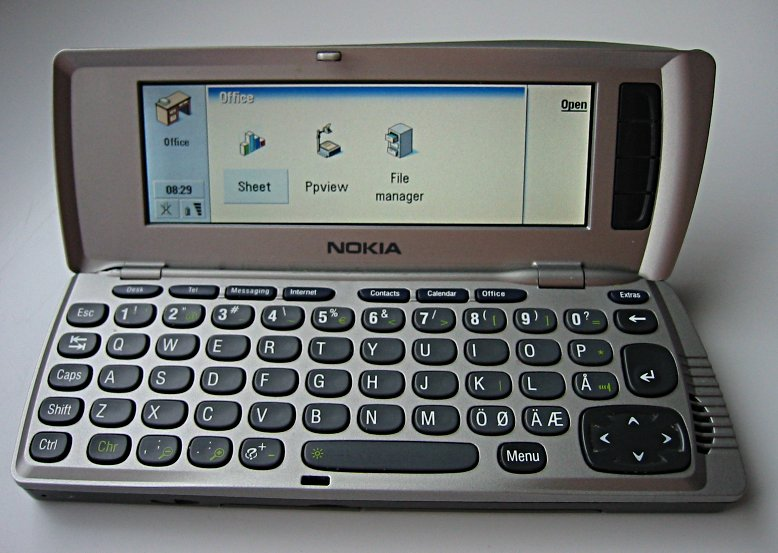
- Nokia 9210's exterior screen UI menu icon
- Manufacturer: Nokia
- First released: June 2001
- Predecessor: Nokia 9110 Communicator (9210/9290); Nokia 9110i Communicator (9210i)
- Successor: Nokia 9300 (9210); Nokia 9300b (9290); Nokia 9300i (9210i); Nokia 9500 Communicator (9210/9210i); Nokia 9500b Communicator (9290)
- Compatible networks: EGSM 900/1800 and HSCSD (43.2 kbit/s)
- Dimensions: 158×56×27 mm (6.2×2.2×1.1 in)
- Weight: 244 g (9 oz)
- Memory: Application 14 MB, user 2 MB
- Removable storage: 16 MB Multi Media Card
- Battery: BLL-3 (1300 mAh)
- Display: 4096-color 640 × 200 LCD screen
- External display: Monochrome 84 × 48 pixels

The Nokia 9210 Communicator is the third-generation Communicator series mobile phone produced by Nokia, announced on 21 November 2000 and released in June 2001. It greatly improved on the second-generation Nokia 9110 Communicator, providing a colour main screen and using an ARM processor. It is one of the few mobile phones able to send and receive fax.

It was the first device to run on the Symbian OS platform, version 6, succeeding version 5 of EPOC. It also introduced Nokia's Series 80 interface, which was the result of Symbian Ltd.'s 'Crystal' design.

It is used as a normal though bulky mobile phone in closed mode; when it is flipped open it can be used like a very small notebook computer with a 640 × 200 screen. The earpiece and microphone are located on the back so one must hold it with the front screen and keypad facing out to make a call. The phone also has speakerphone functionality.

The 9210 Communicator's success helped Nokia overtake both Palm and Compaq to become the leading 'mobile data device' vendor in Western Europe in the third quarter of 2001, when it had a 28.3 percent share in the market.

== Specifications ==
- Main applications: mobile phone, desk application, messaging (SMS, fax, email), Internet (web, WAP), contacts (address book), calendar, office (word processor, spreadsheet, presentation viewer, file manager)
- Extra applications: calculator, clock, games, recorder, and unit converter. In addition, 3rd party software developers could freely implement new applications for the Nokia 9210 Communicator and offer them for download by the users.
- Processor: 32-bit 66 MHz ARM9-based RISC CPU
- Total memory: 24 MB
  - Application memory: 14 MB
  - User memory: 2 MB
  - Execution memory: 8 MB (SD-RAM)
  - 16 MB Multi Media Card in the sales package
- Operating frequency: GSM-900/1800 networks in Europe, Africa, Asia
- Radio: foldout antenna for improved reception.
- Operating system: Symbian OS v6.0, Series 80 v1.0
- Interface: IrDA but no Bluetooth, Serial port cable for PC.
- Audio: Stereo-headset, mp3-player software is optional, additional internal speaker for music and full-duplex speakerphone functionality.
- Includes PC Suite for the Nokia 9210 Communicator, running on Windows platform.
- Vibrating alert: not implemented.

== Variants ==
=== 9210i ===
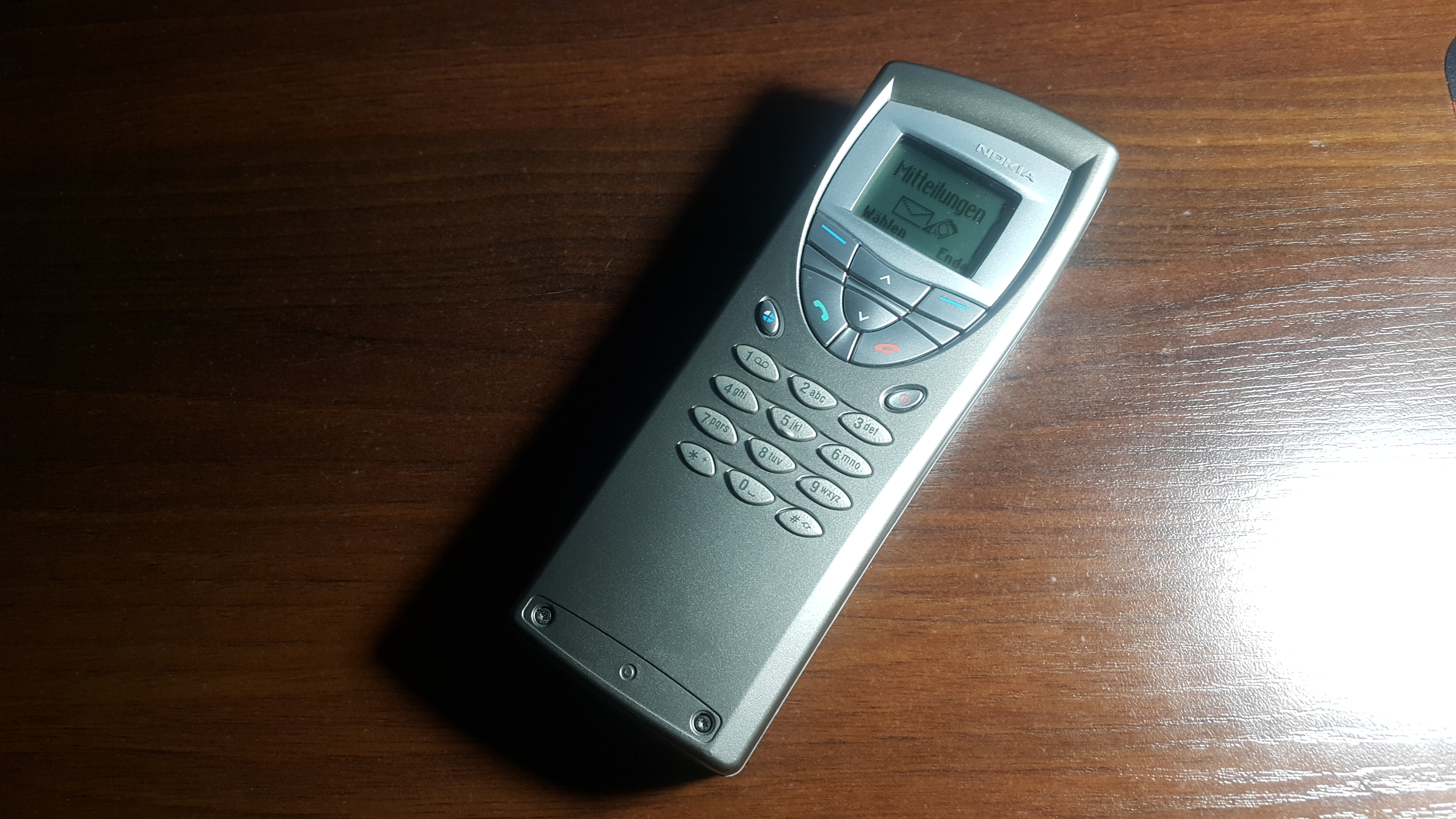
A German 9210i Communicator, closed position.

The 9210i launched in 2002 increased the internal memory to 40 MB and adds the RealPlayer for video streaming. The web browser now supports Flash 5 and HTML 4.01 instead of HTML 3.2 on the 9210. The main screen backlight was also changed from high voltage CCFL tube light to white LED backlight, which was quite new technology at the time.

- Total memory: 40 MB
  - Application memory: 16 MB
  - User memory: 16 MB
  - Execution memory: 8 MB (SD-RAM)
  - 64 MB Multi Media Card in the sales package

=== 9290 ===
The American variant of the 9210i is the Nokia 9290 supporting GSM-1900, first introduced on 5 June 2001 and eventually, after a year-long delay, was released in June 2002.

== Replacement models ==
Nokia replaced the 9210 in first quarter of 2005 with:

- Nokia 9500 – has additional features (Wi-Fi and camera) but is smaller 148 mm × 57 mm × 24 mm) and lighter (222 g), and has an updated Symbian Series 80 operating system.
- Nokia 9300 – is smaller (132 mm × 51 mm × 21 mm) and lighter (167 g) than Nokia 9210, with similar features and the same operating system as the Nokia 9500.

Both new models include other improvements such as: EDGE, colour external displays and Bluetooth.

== Legacy ==
The phone received a resurgence in interest in the 2010s when it was pointed out that a scene in the music video for "Dilemma" by Nelly featuring Kelly Rowland shows Rowland's character typing a text message in her Nokia 9210 using a spreadsheet application. (Note: While most sources identify the application as "Microsoft Excel", the software used by Rowland was the default Sheet application included with the Symbian operating system on the Nokia 9210; the phone is however compatible with Microsoft Excel spreadsheets.) Nelly naively defended the use of the application in an interview with Australian talk show The Project in November 2016, explaining that it was used during the time despite eventually becoming outdated. In subsequent interviews, Rowland admitted to not knowing what Microsoft Excel was, which elicited a response from the application's official Twitter account.

== See also ==
- Ericsson R380
- Nokia 7650
- List of Nokia products
