= Nokia 9300 =

Cell phone model

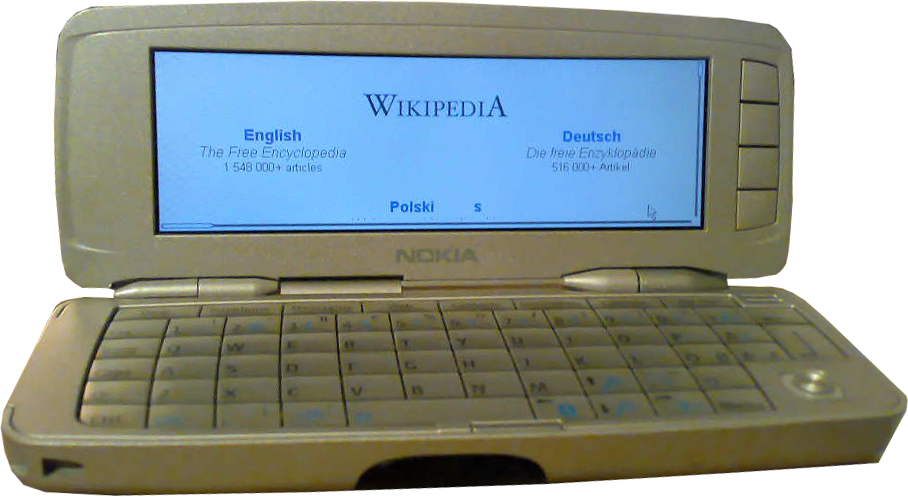
- Manufacturer: Nokia
- Predecessor: Nokia 9210 Communicator (9300); Nokia 9210i Communicator (9300i); Nokia 9290 Communicator (9300b)
- Successor: Nokia E61 (9300); Nokia E61i (9300i); Nokia E63
- Compatible networks: GPRS, EDGE
- Dimensions: 132×51×21 mm (5.20×2.01×0.83 in)
- Removable storage: MultiMediaCard
- Battery: 970 mAh
- Connectivity: Bluetooth, IrDA, Wi-Fi (9300i only)

The Nokia 9300 is a Nokia Series 80 Symbian mobile phone introduced in 2004. It is used as a normal though bulky mobile phone in closed mode, when it is flipped open it can be used like a very small notebook computer with a 640×200 screen. The phone also has speakerphone functionality, which is activated automatically when the phone is flipped open. An MP3 player is also built into the phone. It didn't have vibration motor due to its shape.

The Nokia 9300 was released shortly after the Nokia 9500 Communicator.

Although very similar to the 9500 Communicator, this less expensive model was not officially marketed under the Communicator name by Nokia.

In the United States, the 9300b was sold through Cingular's Business division.

The Nokia 9300 PDA phone was a prominent feature in Live Free or Die Hard, used by character Matt Farrell.

The Nokia 9300i is an updated version with Wi-Fi capability.

== Differences from the 9500 Communicator ==
- Smaller – 132 × 51 × 21 mm compared to the 9500's 148 × 57 × 24 mm
- Physically smaller screen with 9500's resolution that can be tilted full 180 degrees
- No Wi-Fi, except in 9300i
- No built-in camera
- Smaller battery – 970mAh BP-6M battery (later revisions of BP-6M are 1100mAh however) compared to the 9500's 1300mAh BP-5L
- Doesn't bear the traditional name "Communicator"

Other than changes listed above, it is technically the same as the 9500, with the same 150 MHz processor, MMC memory card capability, the same amount of memory and the same screen resolution and colour depth. Both phones run the same version 7 of the Symbian OS.

== Variations in the 9300 line ==
The 9300 is the World version, with 900 MHz and 1800 MHz radios, plus 1900 MHz for North America. The 9300b is the North American model, with 850 MHz and 1900 MHz radios, plus 1800 MHz for world travel. Both, the 9300 and the 9300b will work in the US, but in the US the 9300b outperforms the 9300 in its ability to work in areas with weak cell coverage.

One can tell the 9300 and the 9300b apart by looking at the back of the phone. The 9300b has a portion next to the battery cover that is raised by approximately 2 mm (1/16 in). The model number is marked on the label underneath the battery. The label on a 9300 sold in Germany reads: "NOKIA Model: 9300 Type RAE-6". On a 9300b sold in the US the label reads: "NOKIA Model 9300/b Type: RA-4", and on a 9300i sold in Germany it reads: "Nokia Model 9300i Type: RA-8". Alternatively one can type *#0000# into the phone cover keypad in standby mode to display the model number.

The 9300's successor, the Nokia 9300i, restores Wi-Fi capability without adding a camera. The 9300i is only available with 900 MHz, 1800 MHz and 1900 MHz radios. A version of the 9300i with 850 MHz radio capability was never made in any part of the world. Latest official firmware version is 6.27 (released July 2006).

All variants of the 9300 include multi-profile Bluetooth and IR for interoperability, the Opera web browser, a POP3/IMAP/BlackBerry Enterprise Server-compatible/SMS/MMS e-mail and messaging client, the ability to create, read, write and edit native Word, Excel and PowerPoint files. The external display above the twelve-key dial pad on the exterior of the phone runs Series 40 applications, so texting and simple functions can be performed one-handed without opening the clamshell. There is "T9" option while messaging. The external keypad can autolock only if an unlocking code is set. The cellphone radio can be turned off while permitting applications to run, for in-flight use.

A wide selection of third-party applications to enhance the 9300 series is available through multiple websites. The 9300 also runs Java applications but some of these are not compatible with the large and wide screen, such that many existing Java games will run, but only use the top left hand corner of the screen.
