= Series 80 (software platform) =

Symbian software platform for mobile devices

Nokia's Series 80 (formerly Crystal) is a discontinued, short-lived mobile software platform for their enterprise and professional level smartphones, introduced in 2000. It runs on the Symbian operating system (OS). Common physical properties of this Symbian OS user interface platform are a display resolution of 640×200 pixels and a full QWERTY keyboard. Series 80 used the large size of the Communicator screens to good effect, but software had to be developed for it uniquely, for a relatively small market.

The final Series 80 device was the Nokia 9300i, announced in 2005 and shipped in 2006. Nokia used S60 3rd Edition instead of the Series 80 platform on its final "Communicator" branded device, the Nokia E90 Communicator, released in 2007.

== Features ==
- Support for editing popular office documents
- Full QWERTY keyboard
- Integrated mouse for navigation
- SSL/TLS support
- Full web browser based on Opera
- VPN support

== Devices ==
S80 v1.0:

- Jun 2001 – Nokia 9210 Communicator
- Jun 2001 – Nokia 9290 Communicator
- May 2002 – Nokia 9210i Communicator

S80 v2.0:

- Nov 2004 – Nokia 9500 Communicator
- Jul 2005 – Nokia 9300 (not branded as "Communicator")
- Mar 2006 – Nokia 9300i (not branded as "Communicator")
