= Nokia E61 =

Mobile phone model

Nokia E61/E61i
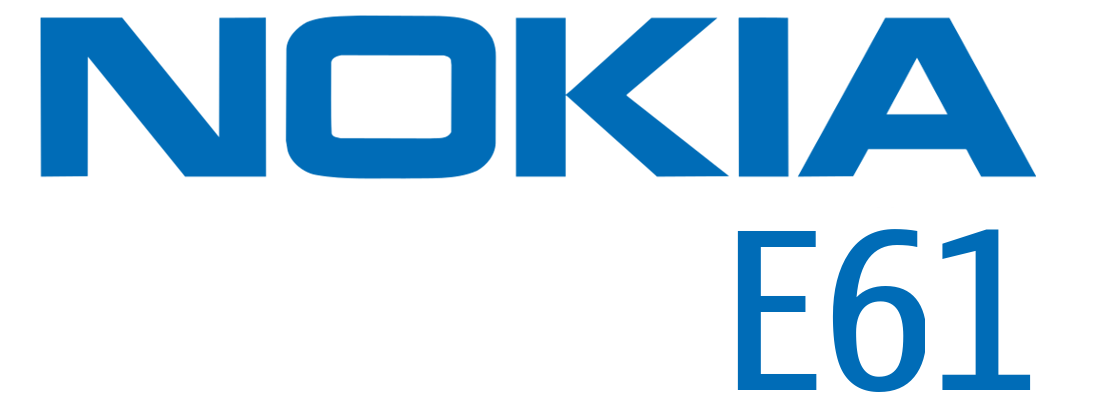

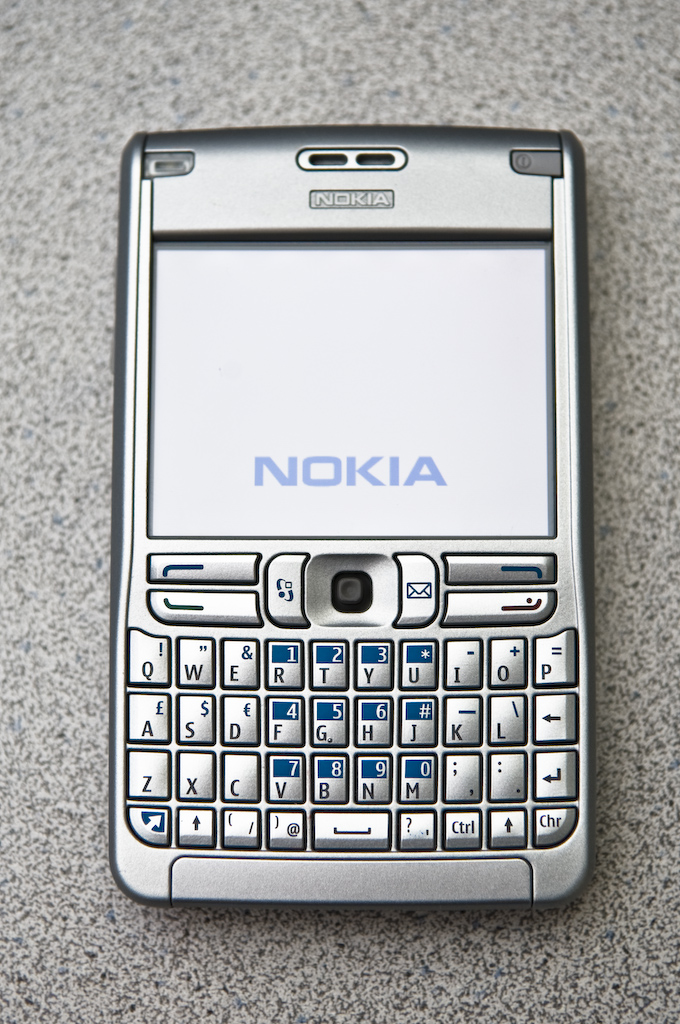
- Manufacturer: Nokia
- Availability by region: 2006 (E61), 2007 (E61i)
- Predecessor: Nokia 9300
- Successor: Nokia E63; Nokia E71
- Compatible networks: WWAN GSM/GPRS/EDGE quad band, UMTS (W-CDMA 2100)/HSCSD/CSD
- Dimensions: 117×69.7×14 mm (4.61×2.74×0.55 in)
- Weight: 144 g (5 oz) / 150 g
- Operating system: S60 platform third edition on Symbian OS
- CPU: 220 MHz ARM-9 processor TI OMAP 1710
- Memory: 64 MB internal
- Removable storage: Mini SD (replaced by Micro SD in E61i)
- Battery: 1,500 mAh lithium-polymer
- Rear camera: None (E61); 2 MPx (E61i)
- Display: Landscape QVGA 320 × 240 LCD screen, 2.8 in, 24 bits (16 million) colors
- Connectivity: WLAN Wi-Fi 54 Mbit/s 802.11g PAN Bluetooth 1.2 (723.1 kbit/s); infrared and full-speed USB
- Data inputs: 46 keys QWERTY thumb keyboard, five-way joystick
- Website: Nokia E61 on nokia.com at the Wayback Machine (archived 2007-01-11)

The Nokia E61 is a smartphone from the Eseries range, announced as part of the new business-focused line on 12 October 2005 along with the Nokia E60 and E70. The Nokia E61 is a 3G-capable smartphone running the S60 3rd Edition platform of Symbian OS. A variant, named Nokia E62, was announced on 12 September 2006 for North and South American markets. On 12 February 2007 Nokia announced the E61i as a follow-up product. The E61/E61i/E62 were altogether succeeded by Nokia E63 and Nokia E71.

== Characteristics ==
=== Additional features ===
- Base Band 5 SIM locking software
- Push to Talk over Cellular (PoC)
- PIM including calendar, to-do list and printing
- Optional Blackberry and other push e-mail service support
- 117 mm × 69.7 mm × 14 mm, 108 cc, 144 g
- Vibrating alert
- VoIP capable (integrated SIP client)
- Loudspeak
- Support for Java ME and native Symbian applications

=== Included software ===
General

- Personal Organizer / Calendar
- File Manager
- Contacts Manager

Media viewers

- Music Player (supports MP3, AAC, WAV, AMR)
- RealPlayer
- Image browser

Internet

- Web browser
- WAP browser (separate to web browser)
- Email client (POP3, SMTP, IMAP)

Office

- Word processor
- Spreadsheet
- Presentation software

=== Included accessories ===
- Mono earphone with inline microphone and answer key
- CA-44 adapter converting former Nokia 3.5 mm power plug to the new 2 mm plug
- Data cable CA-53 from Nokia Pop-Port to USB-A type male connector
- Quick start and user's guide, errata, additional applications booklet
- Charger

=== Interface and connectors ===
Front
Indicator light, Earpiece, Power key, Quarter VGA landscape display, Left selection key, Menu key, Five-way joystick, E-mail key, Right selection key, Call key, End key, 10×4 keyboard also functioning as keypad
Left side
Loudspeaker, Up-down volume keys, Voice key
Bottom
Power jack, 14 pole pop-port connector, Microphone, Infrared transceiver
Back
Battery cover release
Battery compartment
MiniSD card slot (for E61) or MicroSD slot (for E61i), 3 pole battery connector, SIM
Internal
Joystick, display (molex)

== E62 ==
As of Q4 2006, Cingular and Rogers Wireless deployed a similar yet restricted version designated the Nokia E62 in the North American and Brazilian markets. The E62 is substantially similar but without an 802.11 WiFi chipset or W-CDMA (UMTS) 3G support. E61 supports 900/1800/1900 bands, while E62 can operate in 850/900/1800/1900 in order to support American networks.

== E61i ==
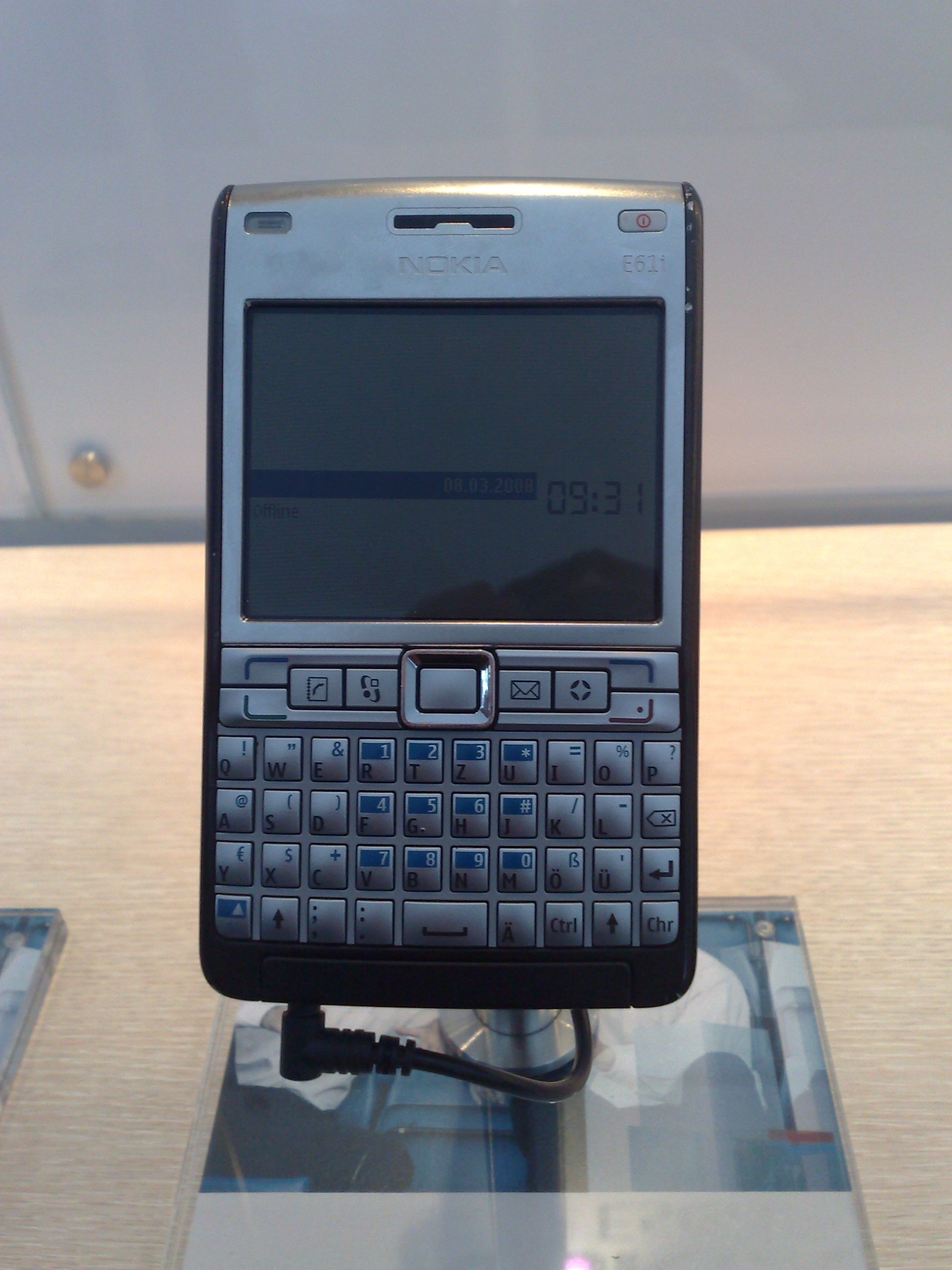
Nokia E61i

The Nokia E61i is an updated version of the E61, announced on 12 February 2007 at 3GSM World Congress.

The main differences over the E61 include:

- 2-megapixel camera
- Navi-key instead of a joystick
- Additional buttons to access quick functions
- Slimmer case design
- Updated battery
- Upgradeable to newer firmware
- External storage updated to microSD, replacing miniSD
- 64 MB of RAM
- More spaced buttons.

== See also ==
- Nokia
- Nokia Eseries
- List of Nokia products
- BlackBerry
- Nokia E71 – Successor
