= Nokia E63 =

Mobile phone model

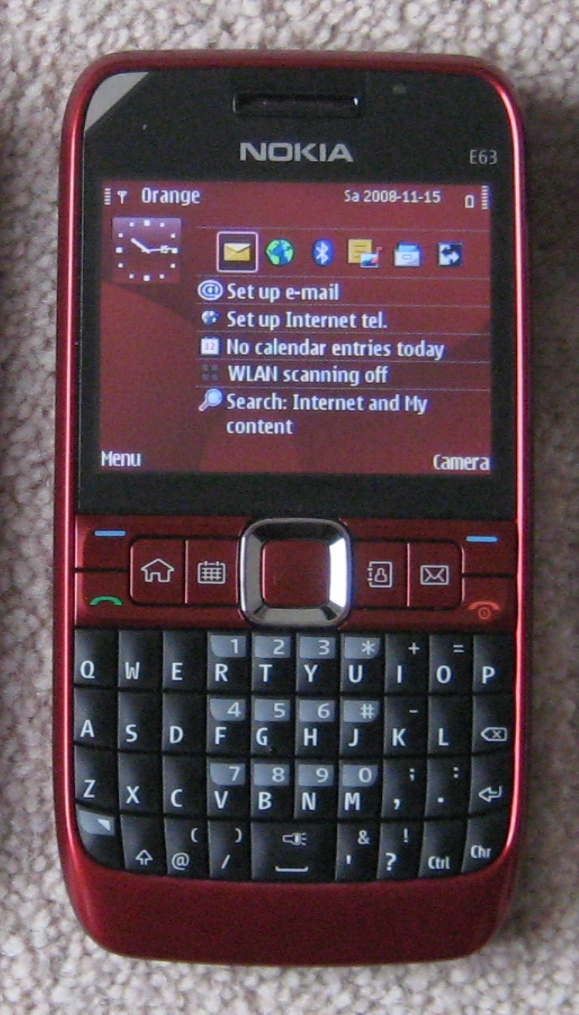
- Manufacturer: Nokia
- Series: E Series
- Availability by region: December 2008 (Worldwide)
- Predecessor: Nokia E61
- Successor: Nokia E5-00; Nokia X5-01
- Related: Nokia E51; Nokia E66; Nokia E71; Nokia E72
- Form factor: Bar
- Dimensions: 113×59×13 mm (4.45×2.32×0.51 in)
- Weight: 126 g (4 oz)
- Operating system: S60 v3.1 (3rd Edition, Feature Pack 1) UI on Symbian OS v9.2
- CPU: 369 MHz ARM11 Freescale processor
- Memory: 110 MB internal dynamic memory
- Storage: 2 GB MicroSD included
- Removable storage: microSDHC Hot-swappable max. 16 GB verified (32 GB unofficial)
- Battery: BP-4L, 3.7V 1,500 mAh lithium-polymer
- Rear camera: 2 megapixel, LED flash
- Display: TFT active matrix, 320 x 240 pixels, 2.36 inches, 16 million colors
- Connectivity: WLAN (Wi-Fi) 802.11 b/g Bluetooth 2.0, microUSB, 3.5 mm standard AV connector
- Data inputs: QWERTY thumb keyboard, Four-way directional keys with central selection key
- Development status: Discontinued

The Nokia E63 is an entry-level smartphone announced on 12 November 2008 and released later that year. It is based on Symbian's S60 software platform and is considered a budget business smartphone positioned below the Nokia E71, featuring a plastic body instead of metal.

Many of the specifications are identical to the E71 except for the lack of GPS and infrared port, a lesser RAM, lack of HSDPA and lower-resolution 2-megapixel camera with a fixed-focus lens. The E63 does come with a flashlight function using the camera flash, which is not present in the E71. It also has a more standardized 3.5 mm audio jack whereas the E71 uses a 2.52 mm jack as used on pre-2008 Nokia phones. In the European market, the E63 was originally retailed for €199 before taxes. The device was succeeded by the Nokia E5 in 2010, but remained in production in some markets until its discontinuation in late 2011 in favour of Nokia's Lumia lineup.

== Design ==
The Nokia E63 came in blue, black, and red. The E63 used plastic rather than stainless steel. The headphone socket's rubber plug was not attached to the phone.

== Specifications ==
The E63 had a QWERTY keyboard. Its display size was 2.36" at 320 × 240 px. It ran on Symbian OS9.2, S60 3.1 Edition. It had a Micro-USB connector and 3.5 mm audio jack. The E63 supported Bluetooth 2.0 and WiFi. It had 110 MB internal dynamic memory and could support up to 8 GB with a microSD memory card slot. The E63's applications included a PDF viewer and Quickoffice. It had a 2MP camera which supported video recording at 320x240px.

== See also ==
- Nokia Eseries
- List of Nokia products
