= Nokia E71 =

Mobile phone model

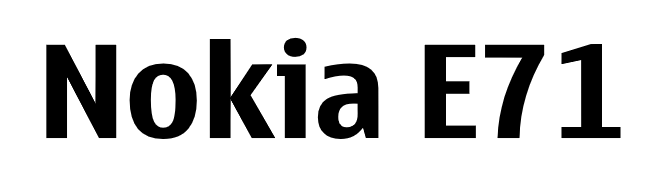

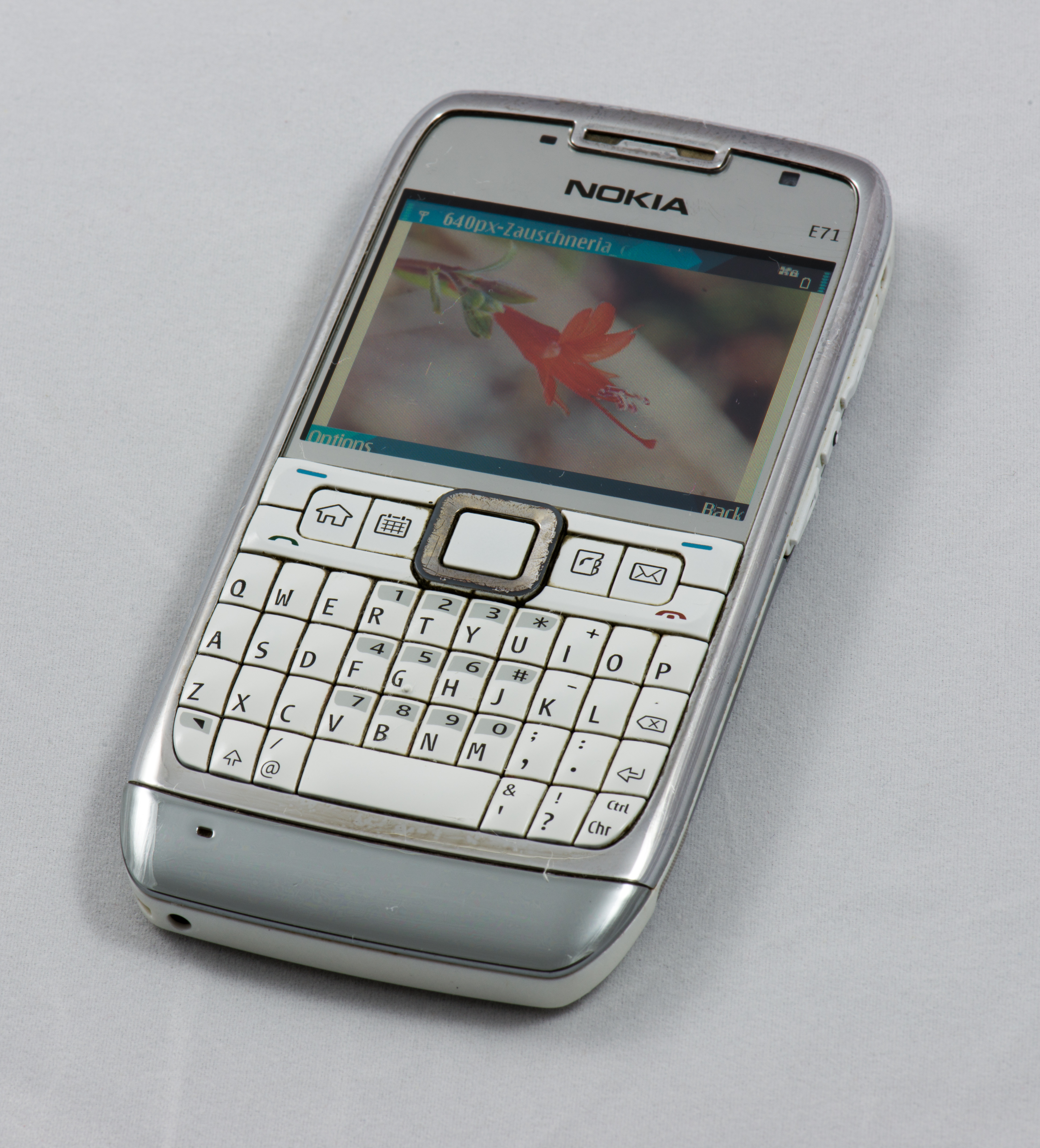
- Nokia E71 (white version)
- Manufacturer: Nokia
- Availability by region: July 2008
- Predecessor: Nokia E61
- Successor: Nokia E72
- Related: Nokia E51; Nokia E63; Nokia E66
- Compatible networks: Quad band GSM / GPRS / EDGE: GSM 850 / 900 / 1800 / 1900; Dual band UMTS / HSDPA: UMTS 900 / 2100 (E71-1) or UMTS 850 / 1900 (E71-2) or UMTS 850 / 2100 (E71-3)
- Form factor: Bar
- Dimensions: 114 × 57 × 10 mm (4.49 × 2.24 × 0.39 in)
- Weight: 127 g (4.5 oz) (with battery)
- Operating system: S60 v3.1 (3rd Edition, Feature Pack 1) UI on Symbian OS v9.2
- CPU: 369 MHz ARM11 Freescale MXC-300-xx processor
- Memory: 110 MB Internal user storage ROM: 256 MB; SDRAM: 128 MB; ~71 MB Free Executable RAM
- Removable storage: MicroSDHC Hot-swappable max. 32 GB
- Battery: BP-4L 3.7 V 1,500 mAh lithium-polymer
- Rear camera: 3.2-megapixel with auto focus and flash
- Front camera: Front-facing video call camera
- Display: 320 × 240 px, 2.36 in, up to 16 million colors
- Connectivity: WLAN Wi-Fi 802.11 b,g, Integrated & Assisted GPS, Bluetooth 2.0, Infrared, microUSB, 2.5 mm Nokia AV connector
- Data inputs: QWERTY thumb keyboard, five-way joystick

The Nokia E71 is a smartphone introduced on 8 May 2008 from Nokia's Eseries range with a QWERTY keyboard targeting business users worldwide. It runs on Symbian OS v9.2, with a S60 3rd Edition, second generation Feature Pack 1 interface. The Nokia E71 succeeded the Nokia E61/61i models, building on the base design and form factor but enhancing on the feature set.

The Nokia E71 was well received and highly popular, described as a "cult classic" and often considered to be one of Nokia's finest ever devices. It was superseded by the Nokia E72 in 2009.

== Features ==
=== Key features ===
- Optimized mobile email and messaging experience with full QWERTY keyboard and pocket-size for one-handed typing
- Two customizable Home Screen views with active stand-by plug-ins and application shortcuts – fast and easy switching between e.g. business and personal modes
- Quick access to applications with One-touch keys (Home, Calendar, Contacts, Email)
- Intelligent input with auto-completion, autocorrection and learning capability ensuring fast and error-free typing
- Nokia Calendar and Contacts for Eseries applications with improved features
- Built-in grade A-GPS and free Nokia Maps
- VOIP/ SIP Calling (Internet calls through Wi-Fi and 3G (if supported by the carrier))
- HSDPA data connection up to 3.6 Mbit/s for fast web browsing and downloading additional features
- 3.2-megapixel camera with auto-focus and flash, self-portrait mirror and a front camera for video calls
- Music player, Media player, Visual Radio, Music Store(Internet Connectivity is required)
- Nokia MiniMap browser
- Online sharing: Share on Ovi
- Built-in mobile VPN for convenient intranet access
- Data encryption for both phone memory and microSD
- Nokia PC Internet access (via Phone as modem)

=== Technical profile ===
- System: GSM/EGSM 850/900/1800/1900 (quad band), WCDMA 900/2100 (E71-1 version), WCDMA 850/1900 (E71-2 version), WCDMA 850/2100 (E71-3 version) and HSDPA class 6, maximum speed 3.6 Mbit/s/384 kbit/s (DL/UL)
- User Interface: S60 platform 3rd Edition (Feature Pack 1 based on Symbian OS v9.2)
- Dimensions: 114 × 57 × 10 mm (L × W × H)
- Standby time: Up to 17 days (GSM), 20 days (WCDMA)
- Talk time: Up to 10.5 hours (GSM), 4.5 hours (WCDMA)
- Main display: 2.36” QVGA (320x240), up to 16 million colors
- Battery: BP-4L, 1500 mAh, Li-Po
- Memory: Up to 110 MB internal memory, support for up to 32 GB microSD-HC memory card

=== Main camera ===
Primary: 3.15 MP, 2048x1536 pixels, autofocus, LED flash Video: QVGA@15fps Secondary: Videocall camera

=== Data services and connectivity ===
- WCDMA max download 384 kbit/s; upload 384 kbit/s
- HSDPA up to 3.6 Mbit/s
- WLAN (IEEE 802.11b/g)
- EGPRS multislot class 32, max download 296 kbit/s; upload 177.6 kbit/s
- GPS and support for assisted GPS (A-GPS)
- FS-USB, Infrared
- Bluetooth wireless technology 2.0 with A2DP stereo audio, enhanced data rates (EDR)
- 2.5 mm AV connector

=== Software utilities ===
Pre-installed:

- Nokia Messaging (SMS/MMS) and Nokia Mail for Exchange (MfE) for push email
- Image, video, track and sound clip Media Gallery
- Nokia Ovi Map
- GPS: Navigation, Position, Trip distance
- WLAN wizard
- Many other utilities

Several open source developers as well as paid third-party developers have created software for various functions and utilities.

=== Nokia original accessories ===
Car:

- Mobile Holder CR-106
- Advanced Car Kit CK-300
- Holder Easy Mount HH-12

Headsets:

- Bluetooth Headset BH-602
- Audio: Bluetooth Speakers MD-5W
- Data: 8 GB Card MU-43

Power:

- Mobile Charger DC-4

Colors: Grey steel, White, Red and black

== Mainland China E71 (RM-493) differences ==
The E71 currently being sold in mainland China does not have Wi-Fi 802.11b/g WLAN networking or a back mounted camera. 3G was also excluded, because licenses for 3G in mainland China were only approved in early 2009.

There is no reduction in price for phones lacking these features and a firmware update will not bring them back because the hardware itself is missing. The E71 sold in Macau and Hong Kong do not lack these features. The software bundled with the Chinese version is slightly different, as it also has a QQ client, along with some other Chinese specific programs.

== Reception ==
The E71 received highly positive critical reception. It was widely praised for its battery life, software features like push email, slim design and hardware including keyboard. A Trusted Reviews reviewer gave it 5 stars out of 5. CNET UK wrote: "While we don't like the camera, we think the rest is pretty close to perfect". TechRadar called it a "terrific" device in a "well thought out package", listing the lack of a 3.5 mm headphone jack as the only disadvantage.

Some publications dubbed it a "BlackBerry killer" or "iPhone killer".

=== Awards ===
- Editors' Choice, Readers' Choice and 8.9 out of 10 rating on CNET.co.uk (as of June 2008)
- Phone of the Year and the Best Smartphone at the 2008 Mobile Choice Consumer Awards
- Wired Magazine's 2008 Best of Test
- Highly Commended in a category of Best Mobile Handset or Device at the GSMA Awards 2009

== Firmware history ==
- 100.07.81/100.07.76: Default firmware upon release
- 110.07.127: Released 9 October 2008 (removed gmail support from mail app)
- 200.21.118: Released 27 November 2008
- 210.21.006: Released 17 March 2009
- 300.21.012: Released 2 July 2009
- 400.21.013: Released 28 November 2009
- 301.21.1 (RM-357 Only)
- 400.21.11 (RM-493; China Version, No 3G and Wi-Fi)
- 410.21.010: Released 8 February 2010
- 500.21.009: Released 6 June 2010
- 501.21.001: Released 12 December 2010 (users complain about bugs and battery drain)
- 510.21.009: Released 19 March 2011 (even more complaints about bugs)

== Gallery ==
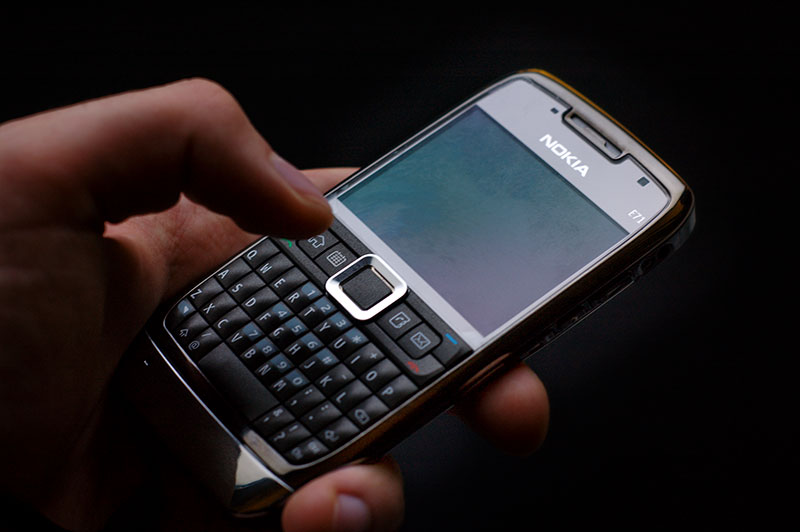
Held in palm

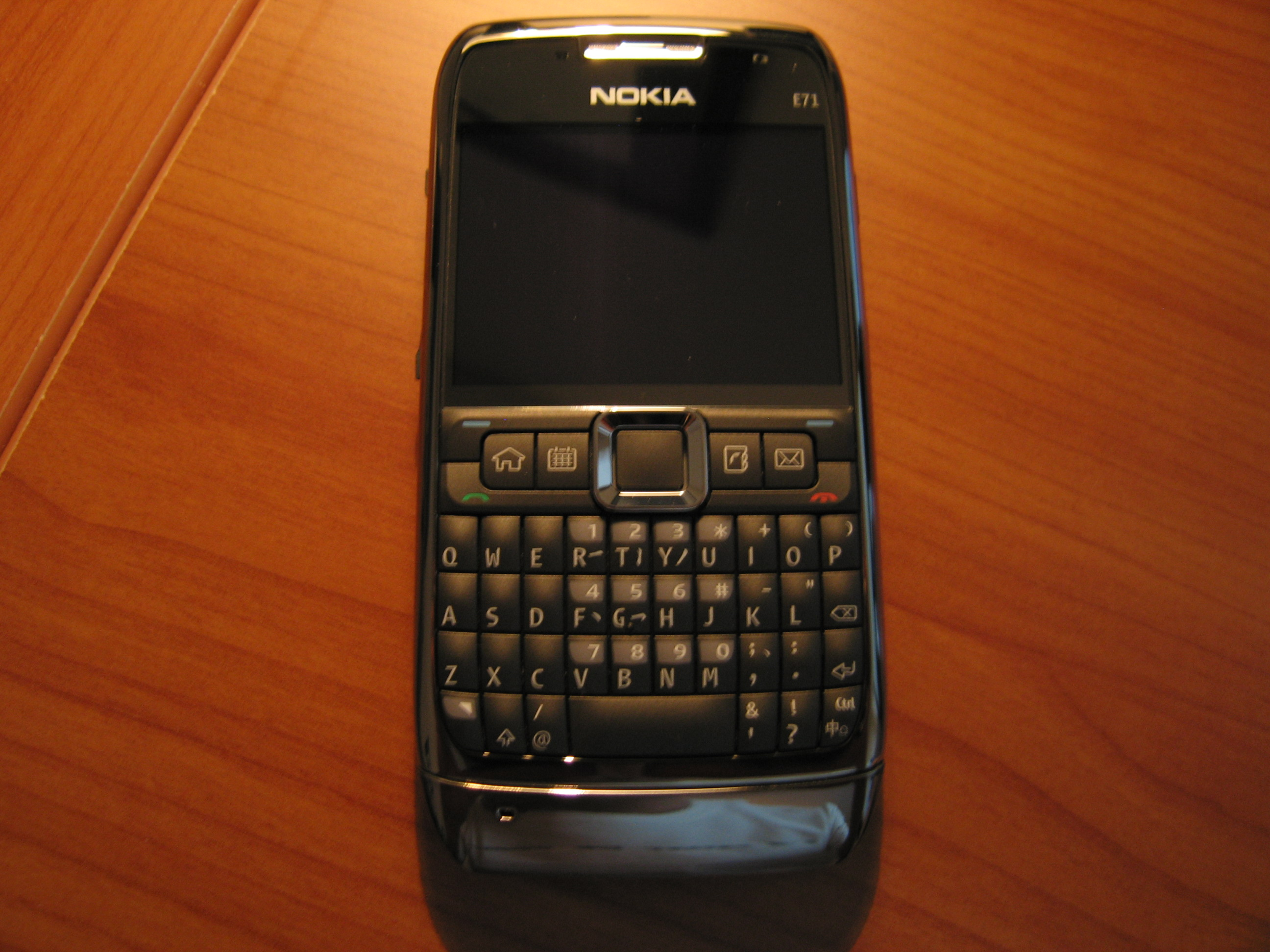
Resting on table

Music player

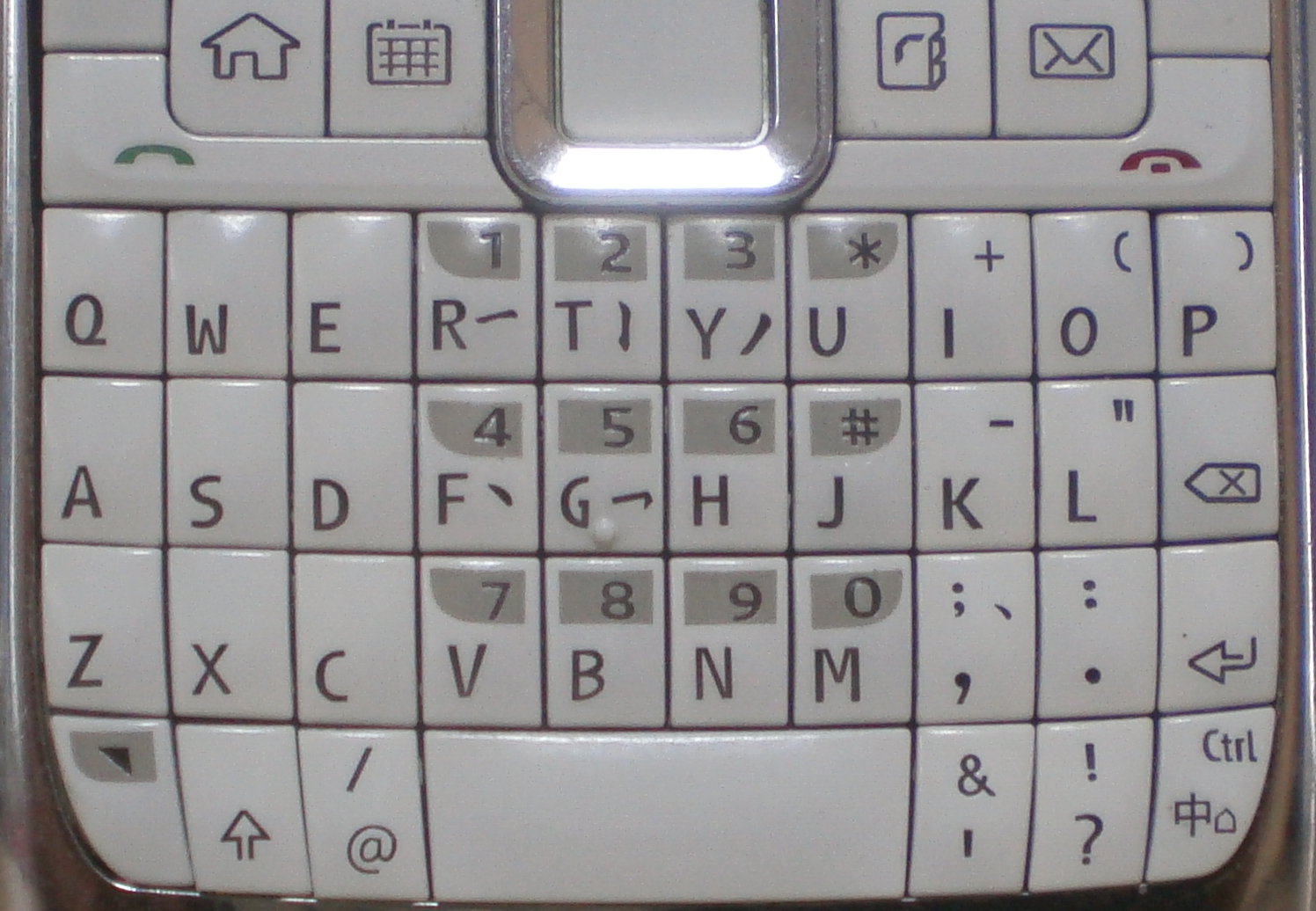
Keyboard of the model for the Chinese market

== See also ==
- Nokia Eseries
- List of Nokia products
