= 6700 =

6700 may refer to:

- 6700, the last year in the 67th century (7th millennium)
- Nokia 6700 classic, a mobile phone released in 2009
- Nokia 6700 slide, a smartphone released in 2010
