= Nokia 6700 =

Nokia 6700 may refer to:

- Nokia 6700 classic
- Nokia 6700 slide
