= 6500 =

6500 may refer to:

- The year 6500 AD
- The number 6500
- Nokia 6500 (original), a mobile phone released in 2002
- Nokia 6500 classic, a mobile phone released in 2007
- Nokia 6500 slide, a slider version of the Nokia 6500 classic
- AMD A8-6500, a CPU released in 2013
- Intel Core i5-6500, a CPU released in 2015
