= Nokia 6500 =

Nokia 6500 may refer to:

- Nokia 6500 (original), a mobile phone released in 2002
- Nokia 6500 classic, a mobile phone released in 2007
- Nokia 6500 slide, a slider version of the Nokia 6500 classic
