= Nokia 6303 classic =

Mobile phone model

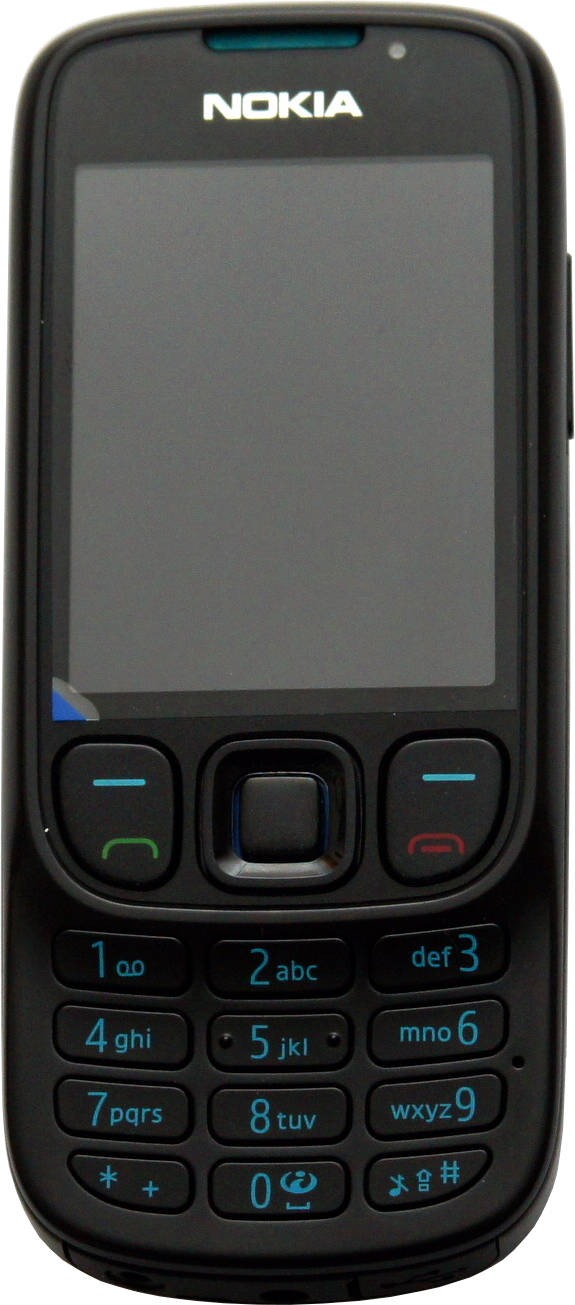
- Manufacturer: Nokia
- Series: Series 6, Classic
- First released: December 2008; 16 years ago
- Availability by region: May 2009
- Predecessor: Nokia 6300
- Successor: Nokia C3 Touch and Type
- Related: Nokia 3120 classic Nokia 6303i Nokia 6301
- Compatible networks: GSM, GPRS, EDGE
- Form factor: Candybar
- Dimensions: 106.4×43.6×11.7 mm (4.19×1.72×0.46 in)
- Weight: 96 g (3 oz)
- Operating system: Series 40 6th Edition
- Memory: 64MB flash, 32MB RAM
- Removable storage: MicroSD, max 8GB
- SIM: miniSIM
- Battery: 1.050 amp-hours Lithium-ion battery
- Rear camera: 3.2 megapixels
- Display: 2.20 inch, 240 x 320 (16.7 million colours)
- Connectivity: Bluetooth, USB
- Data inputs: T9 Keypad
- Development status: Discontinued

The Nokia 6303 classic is a mobile telephone handset produced by Finnish manufacturer Nokia. The Nokia 6303 classic was announced in December 2008, it has been in production since May 2009. It is the successor to the Nokia 6300 (even though PhoneArena claims the Nokia 6700 classic was the successor).

The Nokia 6303 classic was being produced in Hungary as well as in Jucu, Romania.

== Features ==
The phone supports MicroSD cards up to 32 GB, meaning that the phone can be used practically as an MP3 player. Using the supplied and freely available Nokia PC Suite, one has the option of converting MP3s to e-AAC for more compression. The 3.5 mm headphone jack means that many standard commercial headsets will fit the phone. Like most other recent Nokia phones, the 6303 classic replaced their old Pop-Port connector for a standard micro-USB connector.

The phone allows the user to view the video clips in full-screen landscape mode and set the fast-forward/rewind interval from a few seconds to minutes. Improved audio quality for music playback was also noted for this firmware version, thus making the Nokia 6303 classic a music phone similar to its counterparts, the Nokia XpressMusic. In addition, video clips can replace ringtones so that an actual motion picture is shown while there is an incoming call.

Nokia announced the “i” version of the 6303 classic phone in February 2010 which was released in March that year. The 3.2 MP camera lacked autofocus, and video recording was now done at 240×320 at 8 frames per second. It has been refreshed with a new UI and new graphics. The 6303i classic supports up to 8 GB (16 GB according to some sources) MicroSD cards, supplied with 2 GB instead of 1 GB. The internal memory has also been raised to 55 MB. The battery life has been enhanced to 515 hours of standby and 8 hours talk time. It now comes with 7 inbuilt games instead of four (the 6303 had Bounce Tales, Brain Champ, City Bloxx and Sudoku where the 6303i has those 4 games, plus the additional games which are Block'd, High Roller casino and Rally Stars). The 6303i classic has faced negative reviews due to the camera downgrade. These models are not available in 2019 on the Nokia website but can be bought from online shops.

== Reception ==
Although the 6303 classic has smartphone features, it is more user-friendly and straightforward. It is aimed for users who want a reliable and stylish phone, used mostly for calling and texting.

== Specification sheet ==
Type	Specification
Modes	GSM 850 / GSM 1800 / GSM 1900 Americas version (Euro/Asian version has 900 in place of 850 band)
Weight	96 g (3.37 oz)
Dimensions	106.4 x 43.6 x 11.7 mm (4.2 x 1.72 x 0.46 in)
Form Factor	Candybar
Battery Life	Talk time: 7 hours, Standby: 450 hours (17 days); Talk time: 8 hours, Standby: 515 hours in 6303i classic
Battery Type	Li-Ion 1050 mAh (Nokia BL-5CT)
Display	Type: LCD (Color TFT/TFD), Colors: 16.7 million (24-bit), Size: 2.2", Resolution: 240 x 320 pixels (QVGA)
Platform / OS	BB5 / Nokia Series 40, 6th Edition
Memory	18 MB; 55 MB in 6303i classic (built-in, flash shared memory)
Phone Book Capacity	3000
FCC ID	PPIRM-222, PPIRM-217 for Asia/Europe version
SAR	0.57 W/kg
Digital TTY/TDD	Yes
Multiple Languages	Yes
Polyphonic Ringtones	Chords: 64
Ringer Profiles	Yes
Vibrate	Yes
Bluetooth	Supported Profiles: HSP, HFP, A2DP, SAP version 2.1 + EDR
USB	Built-in Micro-USB connector (does not charge phone); Charges phone in 6303i classic
Multiple Numbers per Name	Yes
Voice Dialing	Yes
Custom Graphics	Yes
Custom Ringtones	Yes
Data-Capable	Yes
Flight Mode	Yes
Packet Data	Technology: GPRS Class 32 (100 kbit/s), EDGE (EGPRS) Class 32 (296 kbit/s)
WAP / Web Browser	WAP 3.0 / supports HTML, XHTML, TCP/IP
Predictive Text Entry	Technology: T9
Side Keys	volume keys on right; power/profile selection key on top
Memory Card Slot	Card Type: microSD / TransFlash up to 4 GB. 1 GB card included Up to 8 GB (16 GB according to some sources), 2 GB included in 6303i classic (depending on service provider)
Email Client	Protocols Supported: IMAP4, POP3, SMTP supports attachments
MMS	MMS 2.0 / up to 600 KB per message / SMIL
Text Messaging	2-Way: Yes
FM Radio with RDS function	Stereo: Yes
Music Player	Supported Formats: MP3, MP4, AAC, AAC+, eAAC+, WMA, WAV
Camera	Resolution: 3.2 MP autofocus with 8x digital zoom no autofocus for 6303i classic
Streaming Video	Protocol: 3GPP, H.263, H.264
Video Capture	VGA resolution, 15 frame/s, H.263 format QVGA, 8 frame/s for 6303i classic
Alarm	Yes
Calculator	Yes
Calendar	Yes
SyncML	Yes
To-Do List	Yes
Voice Memo	Yes
Games	Yes
Java ME	Version: MIDP 2.1, CLDC 1.1 supported JSRs: 75, 82, 120, 135, 172, 177, 184, 185, 205, 226
Headset Jack (3.5 mm)	Yes
Push-To-Talk	Yes
Speaker Phone	Yes
Official Latest Firmware Version	10.80
