= Nokia E60 =

2005 mobile phone model

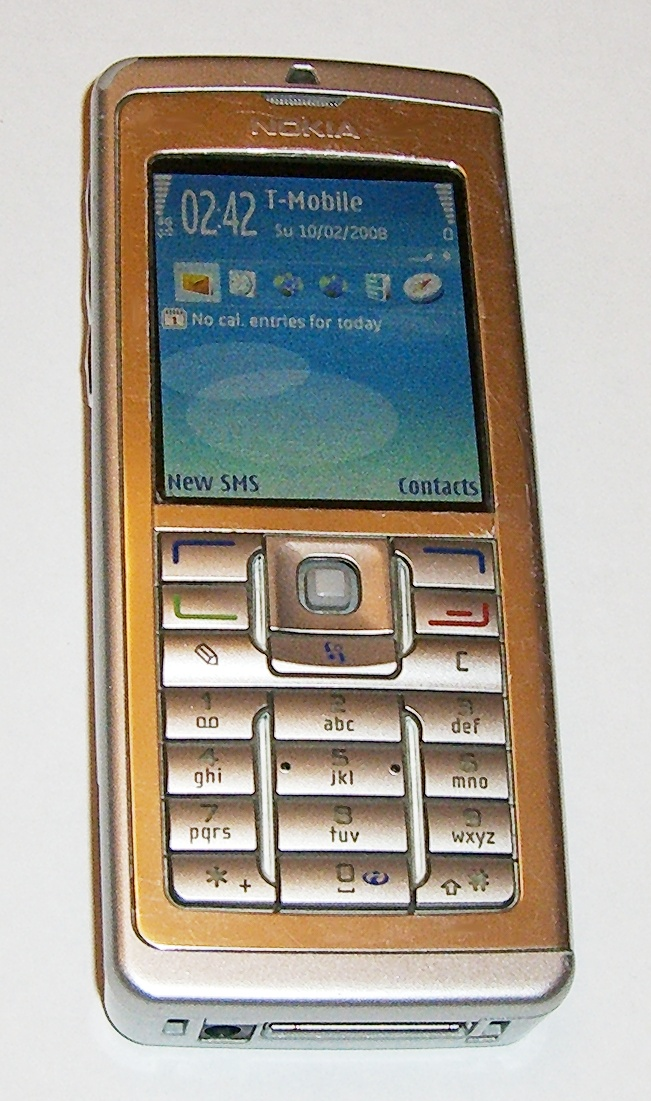
- Manufacturer: Nokia
- Predecessor: Nokia 6230
- Successor: Nokia E51
- Related: Nokia E50
- Compatible networks: EGSM 900, GSM 1800, GSM 1900 and WCDMA
- Form factor: Candybar
- Dimensions: 115×49×16.9 mm (4.53×1.93×0.67 in)
- Weight: 117 g (4 oz)
- Operating system: Symbian OS v9.1, S60 3rd Edition UI
- Memory: 64 MB
- Rear camera: No
- Front camera: No
- Display: 352 × 416
- Connectivity: WLAN (WiFi)

The Nokia E60 is a traditional candybar style mobile phone from the Eseries business phone range, an S60 3rd Edition Symbian device. It was introduced on 12 October 2005 along with Nokia E61 and Nokia E70.

== Key features ==
- Symbian OS v9.1, Series 60 3rd Edition
- 64 MB internal memory
- WLAN (WiFi) with SIP compliant VoIP client
- Bluetooth 1.2, Infrared and USB support
- EGSM 900, GSM 1800, GSM 1900 and WCDMA
- Web browser based on WebKit
- 352 × 416 pixel full colour LCD
- no Radio
- no camera
- 115 mm × 49 mm × 16.9 mm, 117 grams

== See also ==
- Nokia Eseries
- List of Nokia products
