= Nokia 515 =

2013 mobile phone

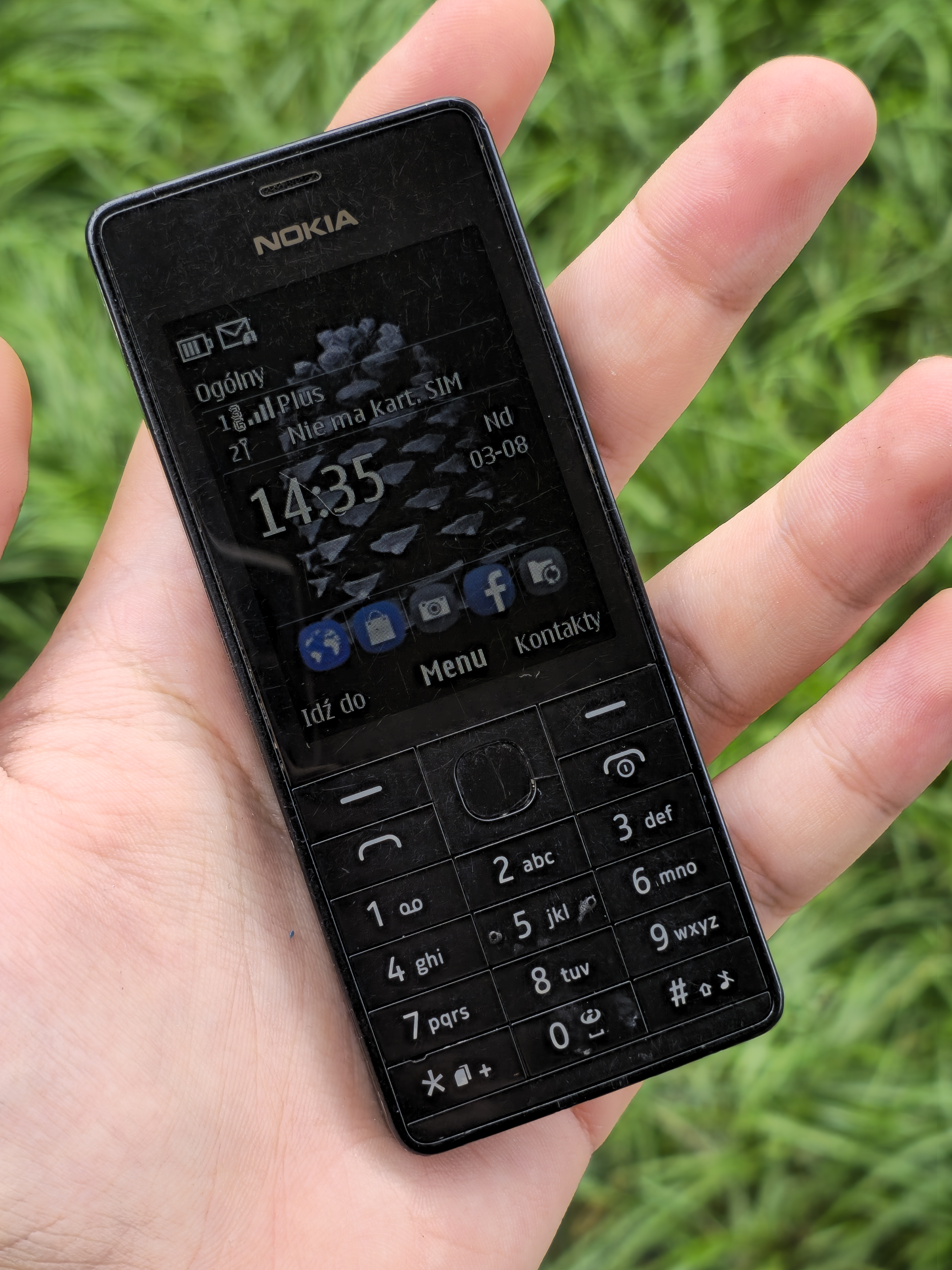
- Manufacturer: Nokia
- Type: Feature phone
- First released: September 2013; 12 years ago
- Predecessor: Nokia 6700 classic
- Compatible networks: GSM 850/900/1800/1900; UMTS 900/2100; HSDPA 7.2 Mbps; HSUPA 5.76 Mbps; GPRS; EDGE
- Form factor: Bar
- Colors: White; Black
- Dimensions: 114 mm (4.5 in) H 48 mm (1.9 in) W 11 mm (0.43 in) D
- Weight: 101.1 g (3.57 oz)
- Operating system: Series 40 6th Edition Feature Pack 1
- CPU: 416 MHz Infineon PMB9803 X-GOLD614, ARM11
- Memory: 64 MB
- Storage: 256 MB
- Removable storage: microSDHC, up to 32 GB
- SIM: microSIM
- Battery: Nokia BL-4U, 1200 mAh, 3.7 V user replaceable Li-ion
- Charging: Micro USB 2.0
- Rear camera: 5 MP (2592×1944px max.); LED flash QVGA video recording (320×240 px. MPEG4 at 30 fps max.)
- Display: 2.4 in (61 mm) diagonal TFT LCD; 240 × 320 px QVGA; 1:1.3̅ aspect-ratio full-screen 256K colors
- Sound: Mono speaker, 3.5mm stereo audio jack
- Connectivity: Bluetooth 3.0 with A2DP, HFP, HSP, OPP and DUN; Micro USB 2.0
- Data inputs: Keypad; Push buttons
- Made in: China
- Other: USB tethering

The Nokia 515 is a mobile phone made by Nokia and the successor of the 6700 classic. It was announced on 28 August 2013 and was first made available to Russia, Germany, Switzerland and Poland the following month, with a suggested retail price of €115.

Compared with its predecessor, it featured updated Bluetooth support, a higher capacity battery, an integrated Whatsapp application and Panorama support in the camera application. Downgrades included a slower processor, no GPS support and no WebKit-based web browser.

The 207, 208 and 301, released the same year, share the same hardware platform. The 515 is distinguished primarily with it having an anodised, sandblasted aluminium body and a display protected with Gorilla Glass 2.

A Dual SIM variant was available, with 3G support limited to one of the two SIM slots.

The Nokia 515 was the final mobile phone running the Series 40 operating system, and the last Nokia-branded feature phone with 3G support until the Nokia 3310 3G of 2017. Unlike the 515, neither the 3310 3G or any other Series 30+ mobile phone support tethering.
