= 6800 =

6800 may refer to:

== Technology ==
- Motorola 6800, a microprocessor
- GeForce 6800, a series of graphics cards from Nvidia
- Nokia 6800 series, mobile phones
- Radeon HD 6800 series, a line of graphics processing units from AMD released 2010
- Radeon RX 6800 series, a line of graphics processing units from AMD released 2020

== Train types ==
- GWR 6800 Class, a class of steam locomotives
