= Nokia C5-00 =

2010 mobile phone from Nokia

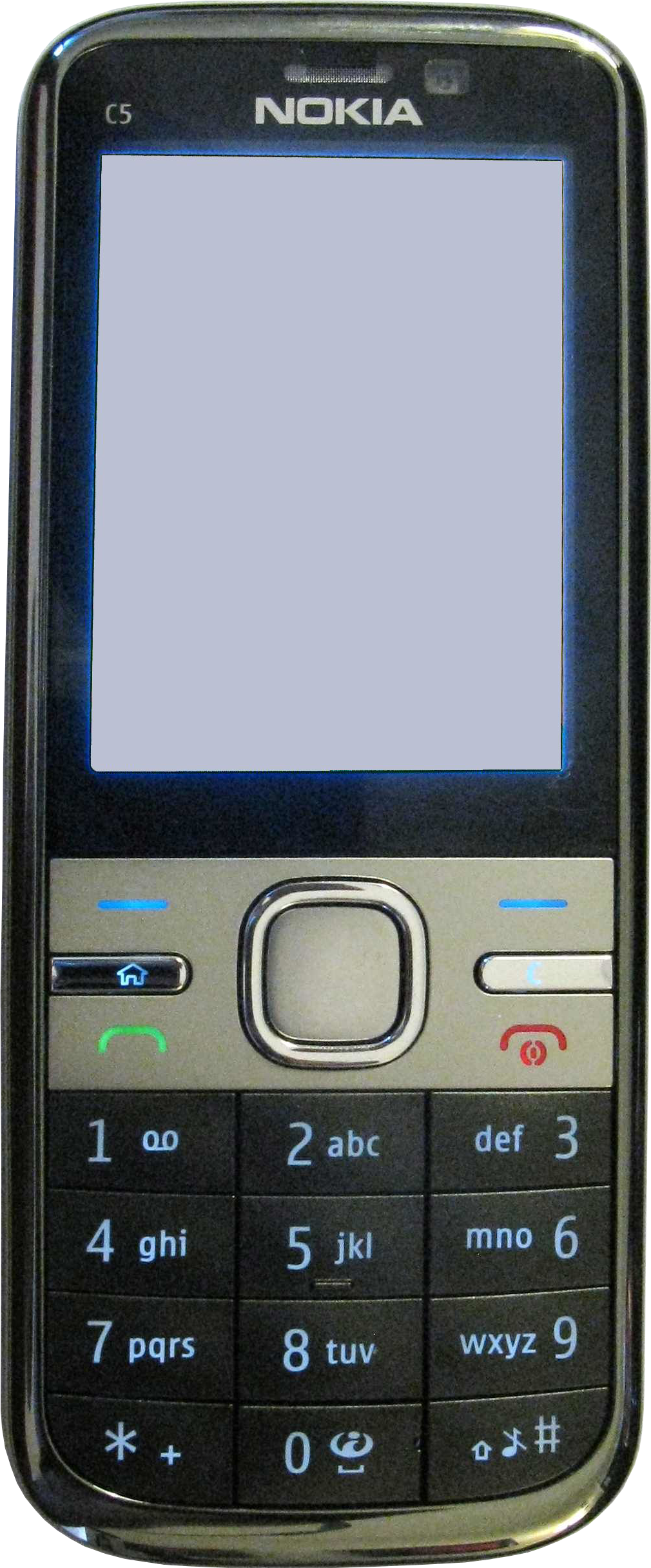
- Manufacturer: Nokia
- Series: Nokia Cseries
- Availability by region: April 2010
- Predecessor: Nokia 6700 classic Nokia 6730 classic
- Related: Nokia C6-00; Nokia E5-00; Nokia 6700 slide
- Compatible networks: GSM EDGE 850, 900, 1800, and 1900. UMTS 2100, and 850 for US model or 900 for EU model ; GPRS/EGPRS MSC32 class B, maximum speed up to 298/178.8 kbps (UL/DL); HSDPA cat9, maximum speed up to 10.2 Mbit/s; HSUPA cat. 5, maximum speed up to 2 Mbit/s; Dual transfer mode; TCP/IP support; Capability to serve as data modem
- Form factor: Monoblock
- Dimensions: 112×46×12.3 mm (4.41×1.81×0.48 in)
- Weight: 89.3 g (3 oz) (0.197 lb)
- Operating system: S60 3rd Edition Feature Pack 2 UI on Symbian OS v9.3, firmware 071.005
- CPU: ARM 11 600 MHz processor
- Memory: 128 MB RAM
- Storage: 50 MB on-board memory, up to 16 GB (32 GB for C5-00.2) on MicroSD card
- Removable storage: MicroSD up to 16 GB, included 2 GB
- Battery: BL-5CT 1.05 Ah Li-ion battery
- Rear camera: 3.2-mega pixel, 4× digital zoom, VGA video recorder (15fps) LED flash, 2,048×1,536 pixels
- Display: 320 × 240 2.2-inch (5.6 cm)
- Sound: Audio playback: MP3, AAC, eAAC, eAAC+, WMA
- Media: Video playback: MPEG-4 SP, H.264, RealVideo, WMV9, Flash Video
- Connectivity: USB 2.0, Bluetooth 2.0,
- Data inputs: 5 way Navi key and two soft keys; Call, end, clear and application keys; Side volume keys; Alpha numeric keypad

The Nokia C5-00 is the first mobile phone of the Nokia Cseries lineup, announced 1 March 2010. Its primary features include multimedia, messaging and social networking capability, including Facebook and Flickr applications. It also allows multitasking and has a 2.2-inch (56 mm) display and a 3.2 megapixel camera (C5-00.2: 5 MP). Similar to the previous multimedia-focused Nokia Nseries, the C5-00 runs on Symbian OS with S60 3rd Edition Feature Pack 2.

The Nokia C5-00 was made globally available in the second quarter of 2010.

The C5-00 comes in a monoblock form factor and weighs 89.3 grams (3.15 oz) with the battery. It has a 5-way Navi-key, two soft keys, separate call, end clear and application keys as well as volume keys on the side. The phone user interface and the ring tones can be customized.

The announced maximum talk time varies from 4.9 hours in 3G networks to up to 12 hours in plain GSM networks. The maximum standby times are 630 and 670 hours respectively. Music can be played for a maximum of 34 hours if the phone is in the offline mode.

The phone features Bluetooth connectivity, a 3.5 mm AV connector and a stereo FM radio. It can act as a data modem, supports calendar and contact synchronization with Microsoft Outlook and can be charged via USB. Conference calls with up to three participants can also be made.

The Nokia C5-00 also features an integrated web browser. It supports the XHTML markup language, Flash Lite 3.0, video streaming and RSS feeds.

The camera on the back has a flash with an announced operating range of 1.5 meters. The camera has a few different capture, colour tone, scene and white balance modes and has a horizontal orientation. There is also a photo editor on device. Video can be captured for as long as there is memory available. The device also features a secondary, VGA resolution camera for video calls.

The Nokia C5-00.2 as of 2011 comes with a 5-megapixel camera, 256 MB RAM and support for up to 32-gigabyte cards.
