= Nokia E51 =

Symbian OS mobile phone

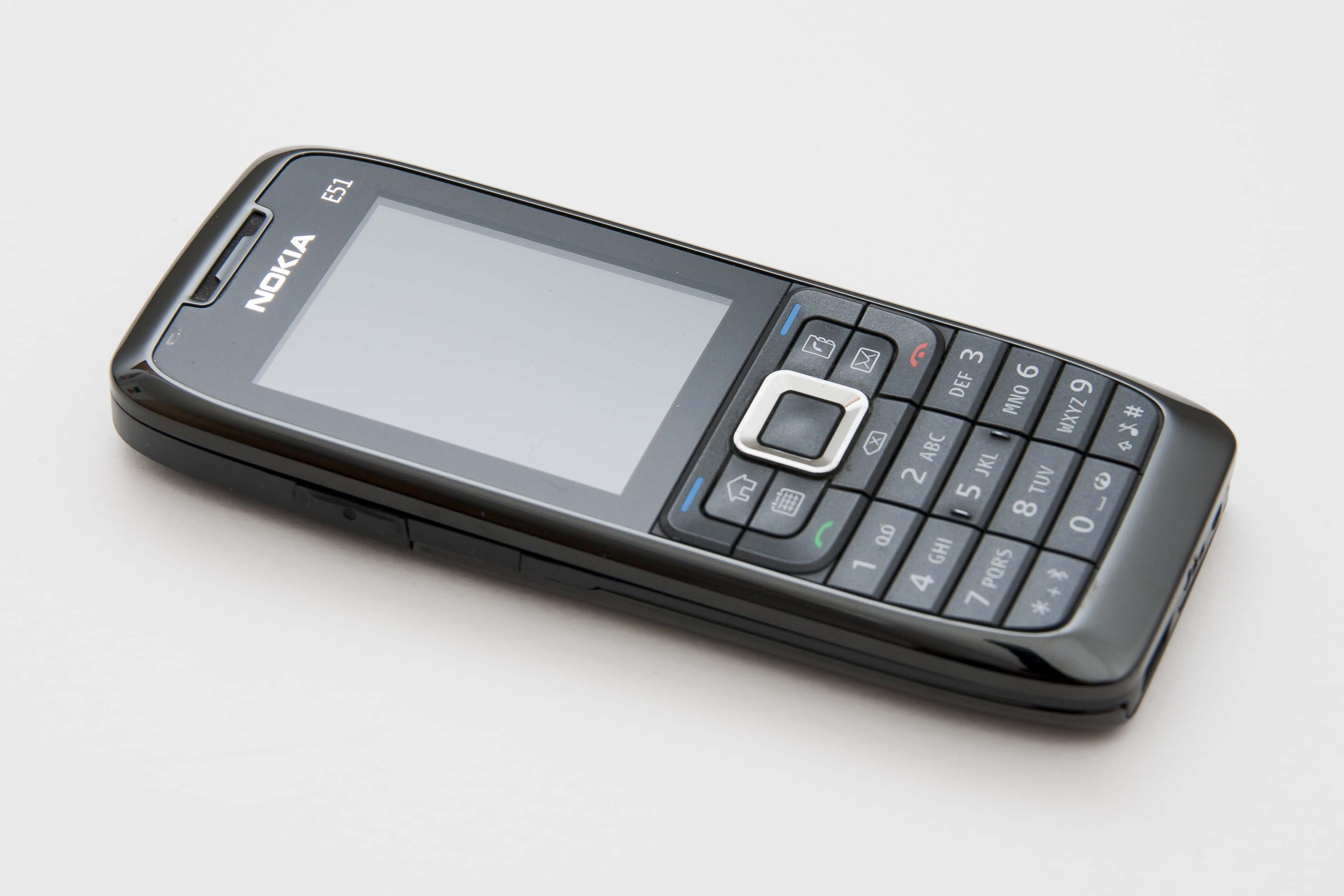
- Manufacturer: Nokia
- Availability by region: November 2007
- Predecessor: Nokia E50; Nokia E60
- Successor: Nokia E52/E55
- Related: Nokia E63; Nokia E66; Nokia E71
- Compatible networks: EGSM 850/900/1800/1900, UMTS 850/2100
- Form factor: Candybar
- Dimensions: 115 × 47 × 12 millimeters (4.49" × 1.81" × 0.47"); 61 cc
- Weight: 100 g (3.52oz)
- Operating system: S60 3rd Edition, Feature Pack 1
- CPU: ARM 11 369 MHz
- Memory: Max User Storage = 130 MB (Internal); Free Executable RAM = 70 MB
- Removable storage: MicroSD Memory Card swappable up to 32 GB SDHC cards.
- Battery: Nokia BP-6MT, 3.7V, 1050 mAh
- Rear camera: 2.0-megapixel
- Display: 16 m color TFT, QVGA (240 × 320 pixel) resolution, 2.0 in (50.8 mm)
- Connectivity: USB Mass Storage via USB 2.0, miniUSB, Bluetooth 2.0, Infrared, Wi-Fi

Nokia E51 is a Symbian OS mobile phone by Nokia announced on 18 September 2007 as the replacement of the Nokia E50 in the business-focused Eseries line. It was the second Nokia UMTS / HSDPA dual band device. The phone was available with a black, silver or bronze-coloured border and backplate. It has a slim body made of stainless steel (12 mm thick, 100 g weight), and was the smallest Nokia smartphone of the time, yet is still technologically capable like other S60 devices of the time. A version without the integrated camera also existed. The E51 was highly acclaimed and was succeeded by the Nokia E52.

== Features ==
The Nokia E51 features comes standard with a full Nokia Mini Map Browser, email client supporting IMAP4, POP3, and SMTP, Quickoffice Suite, and Mail for Exchange. The display is 24-bit (16 million) colour with a resolution of 240x320 pixels. Nokia E51 also has Push to Talk over Cellular (PoC), Bluetooth (v2.0+EDR), Wi-Fi (802.11b/g), Infrared port, and a miniUSB port.

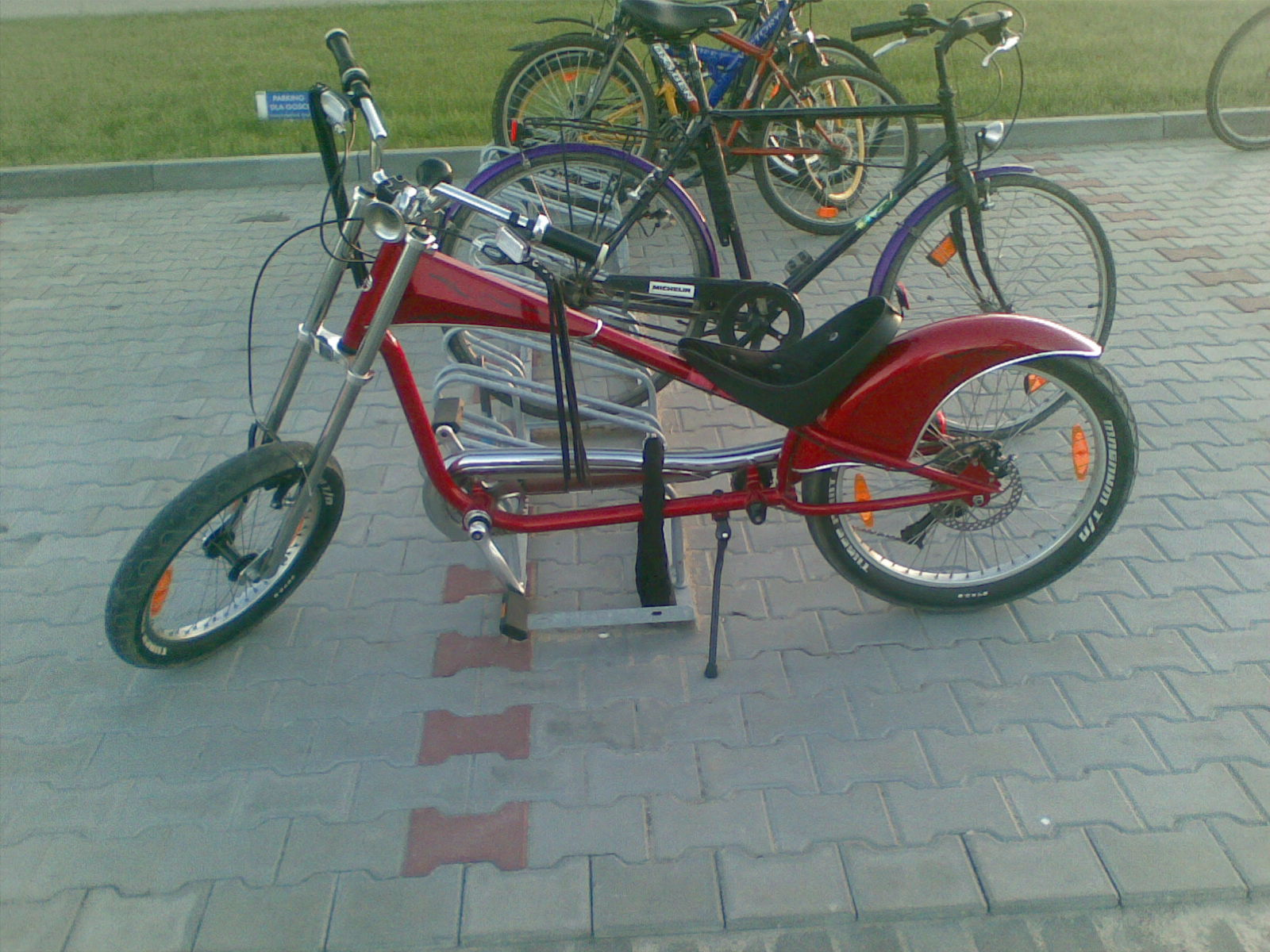
Photograph taken by the Nokia E51

There is a total of 130 MB user storage which can be expanded using a microSD card to up to 32 GB. There is also a media player and FM radio using a headset.

== See also ==
- Nokia Eseries
