= Nokia 6500 slide =

Slider Nokia feature phone from 2007

Nokia 6500 Slide
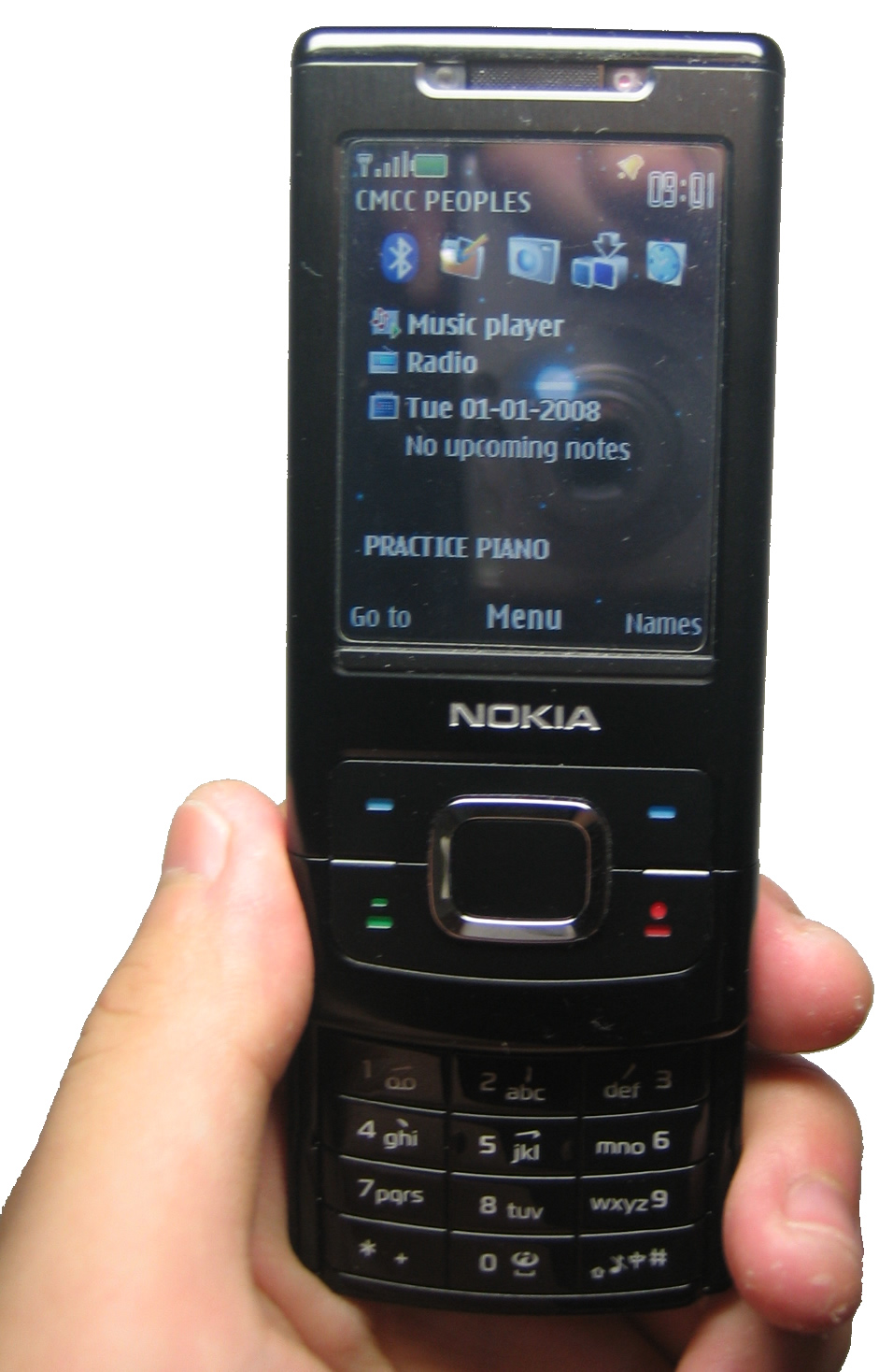
- The Nokia 6500 in black.
- Developer: Nokia
- Type: Feature phone
- Family: Series 40
- First released: Announced in May, released in September 2007
- Discontinued: Discontinued in 2009
- Predecessor: Nokia 6233
- Successor: Nokia 6700 slide
- Related: Nokia 5610 XpressMusic; Nokia 6300; Nokia 6230i Nokia 6500 Classic
- Compatible networks: Quad band GSM / GPRS / EDGE: (850, 900, 1800, 1900 MHz) Dual band UMTS (W-CDMA): (850, 2100 MHz)
- Form factor: Slider
- Colors: Silver, black
- Dimensions: 96.5×46.5×16.4 mm (3.80×1.83×0.65 in)
- Weight: 124 g (4 oz)
- Operating system: Series 40 5th Edition
- CPU: ARM9-based single core, not publicly advertised
- Memory: 32 MB SDRAM + 64 MB flash ROM
- Storage: 20 MB
- Removable storage: microSDHC up to 4 GB, unofficially up to 32 GB
- SIM: Single miniSIM
- Battery: User replaceable 900 mAh Li-ion (BP-5M)
- Charging: 800mA with the standard 2mm charger
- Rear camera: 3.2 megapixels, Carl Zeiss AG optics with auto-focus
- Front camera: VGA camera (for video calls)
- Display: 2.2 inch QVGA LCD (16.7 million colors)
- Media: Supports MP3, AAC, and WMA for audio, supports up to QVGA with H.263 for video
- Connectivity: Bluetooth 2.0, Micro-USB with USB 2.0, 2.5mm AV connector

The Nokia 6500 slide is a slider feature phone released in 2007 by the Finnish company Nokia. The phone runs the Nokia Series 40 platform. It is the slider variant of the 6500 Classic, and more multimedia focused.

== Design ==
The case is made of brushed stainless steel with piano black plastic accents on the bottom. On the front, there is a D-pad mainly used for navigation with a trigger button in center, accompanied by a set of selection buttons (that can also be assigned shortcuts) and call keys. A camera shortcut and a volume rocker is placed on the right side, with the camera shortcut also functioning as a shutter key. The key design follows a minimalist approach, with bars favored over icons.

A rubberized grip is placed beneath the display for sliding the upper housing. On top, there's a notch containing the video camera, the earpiece grill and the light sensor.

The keypad is illuminated and contains standard keys, as well as a browser and silent mode shortcut.

The overall design is well-received by critics.

== Interface ==
The 6500 Slide runs Nokia's S40 5th Edition with Feature Pack 1 (with the latest firmware), being one of the first to come with 5th Edition. The UI is praised by critics for its speed and simplicity.
