= Nokia E70 =

2006 mobile phone model

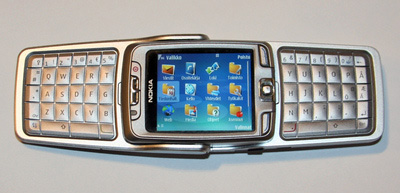
- Manufacturer: Nokia
- Availability by region: May 2006
- Predecessor: Nokia 6800 series Nokia 5510
- Successor: Nokia E75; Nokia E7-00
- Related: Nokia E61; Nokia E50; Nokia N70
- Compatible networks: 900, 1800 and 1900 MHz GSM (E70-1) or 850, 1800 and 1900 MHz GSM (E70-2), Class 10 GPRS, Class B MSC 10 EDGE (EGPRS), UMTS/WCDMA (E70-1 only)
- Dimensions: 117 × 53 × 22 mm (4.61 × 2.09 × 0.87 in)
- Weight: 127 g (4.5 oz) with battery BL-6C
- CPU: 220 MHz ARM9
- Memory: 64 MB built-in
- Removable storage: MiniSD card
- Rear camera: 2.0 MP
- Display: 352 × 416 pixels, 262K colors
- Connectivity: IEEE 802.11b/g wireless LAN, Bluetooth v1.2, infrared, data cable included

The Nokia E70 is a candybar/fold keyboard-type mobile phone from the Eseries range, announced in October 2005 and released in May 2006. There are two models of this phone, the E70-1 for the world market with tri-band (900, 1800, 1900 MHz) GSM and UMTS, and the E70-2 for the Americas with tri-band (850, 1800, 1900 MHz) GSM and EDGE packet data capability. Both models use the S60 platform 3rd Edition on top of Symbian OS version 9.1.

The E70 is the business version/successor to the Nokia 6800 series (6800, 6810, 6820 and 6822).

== Key features ==
- Screen resolution: 352×416
- Processor speed: 220 MHz
- 45 MB RAM, about 22 MB available
- Multimedia Messaging v1.2
- Push to talk
- Java MIDP 2.0
- Web Browser for S60
- POP3, IMAP4, SMTP E-mail
- SIP client for VoIP calls
- Wi-Fi (802.11b/g) with WEP/WPA
- Bluetooth with up to six concurrent connections (though only one can be a headset).

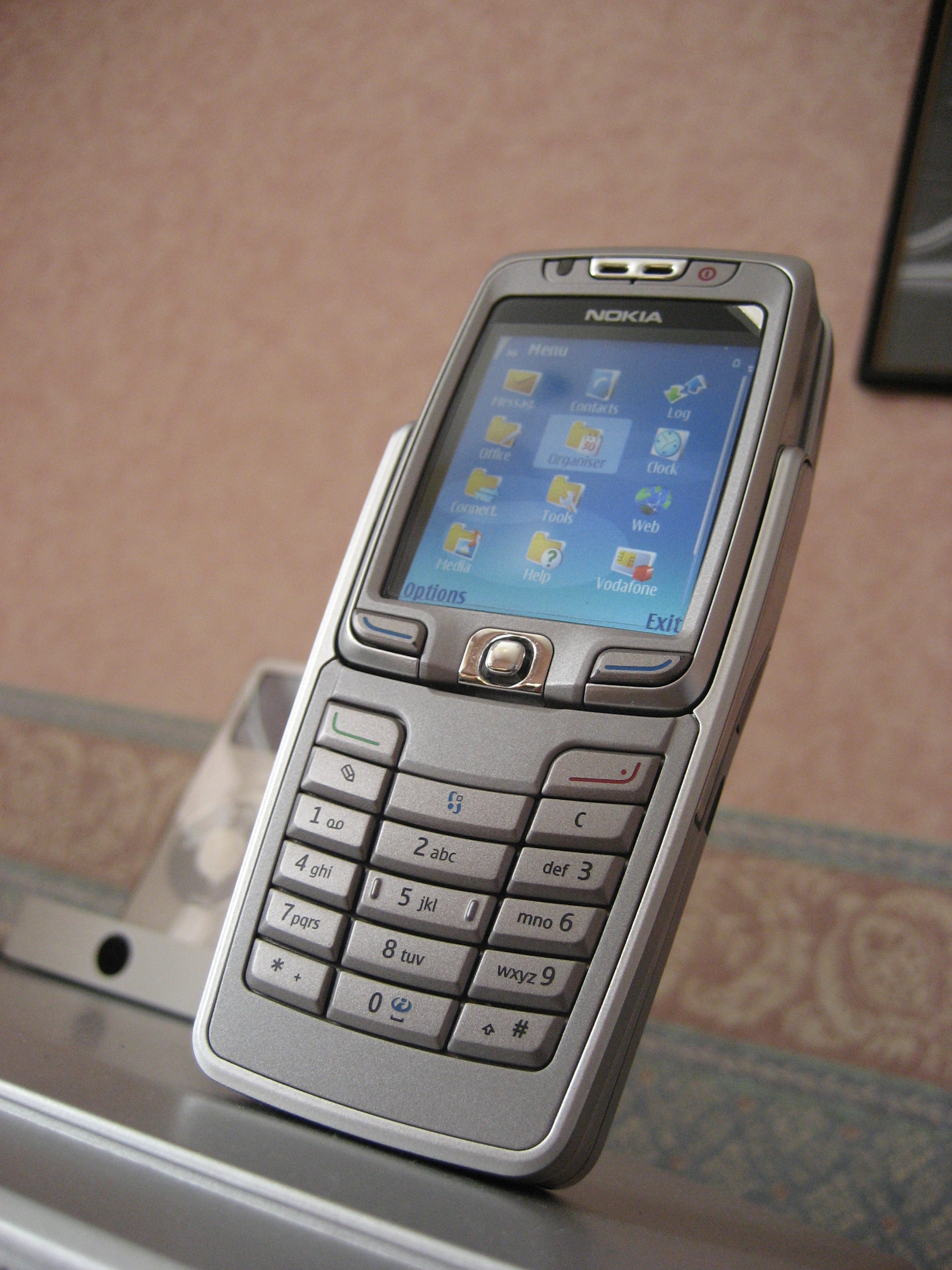
Nokia E70

- Speaker-independent voice calls and commands
- Speech synthesis mode for visually impaired
- Mini QWERTY fold-out keyboard
- Polyphonic tones and MP3 playback
- 2.1-inch (35×42 mm) display
- Vibrating alert
- HF speakerphone
- Offline mode
- 117 × 53 × 22 mm (4.61 × 2.09 × 0.87 in)
- 1.01 W/kg (type RM-10), 0.90 W/kg (type RM-24) SAR-Rating

The Nokia E70 is aimed at the high-end professional market. The 16 million color screen has a 352 × 416 pixel (totalling 146,432 pixels) resolution, and the E70 is capable of GSM, Wi-Fi and Bluetooth connectivity. The SIP VoIP functionality will currently not work through a firewall or most router configurations. Nokia has made a statement that they are working on implementing STUN (originally planned for 2006 but only available for E70-1 as of April 2012), TURN and ICE (also planned for 2007 but not available as of June 2008).

As well, the advanced Bluetooth capabilities of the phone, capable of connecting to up to six devices simultaneously, lacks A2DP support.

== See also ==
- Nokia Eseries
- Symbian
- Nokia Series 60
- List of Nokia products
