= Nokia E52/E55 =

Cell phone

Nokia E52 and Nokia E55
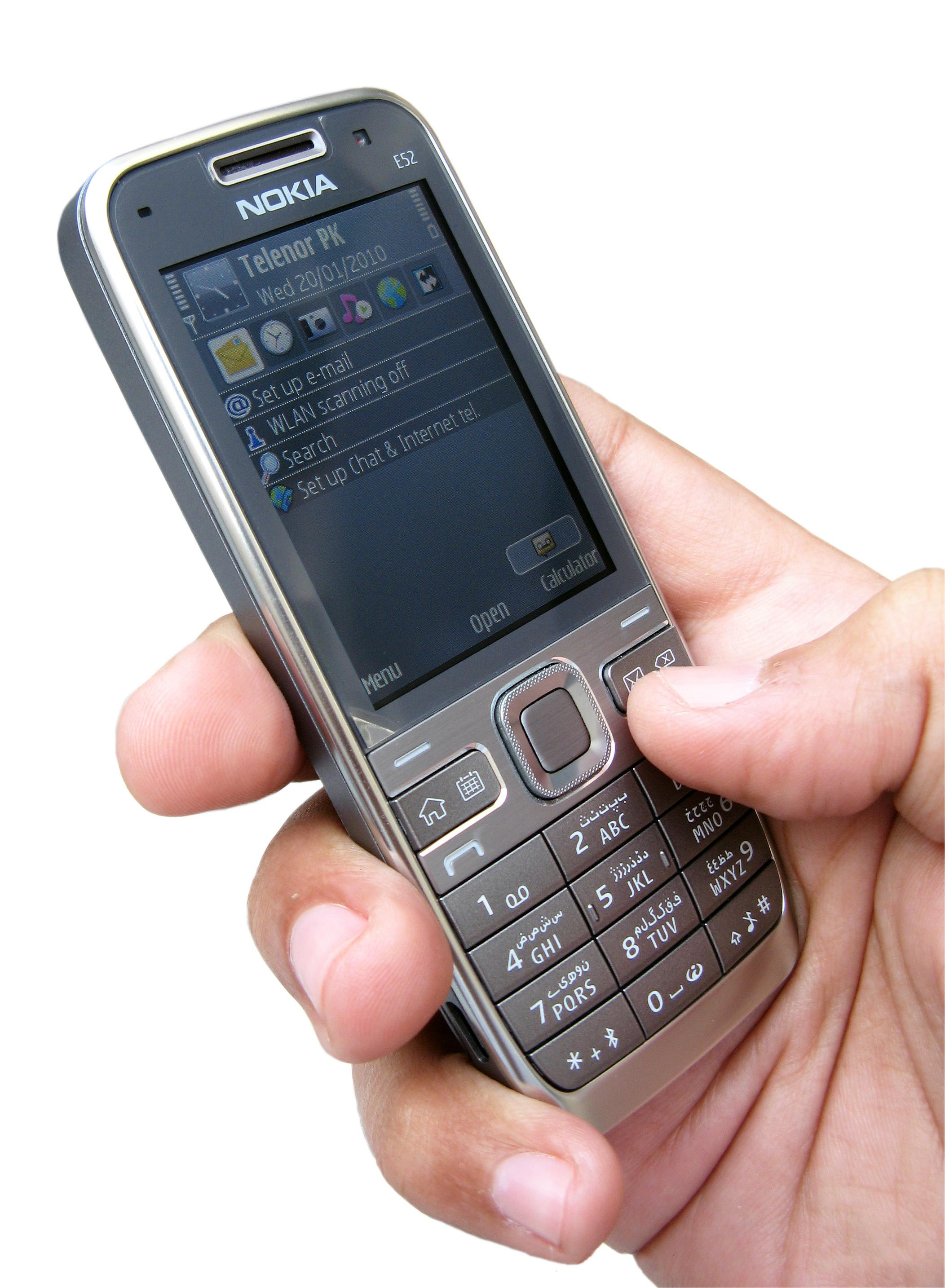
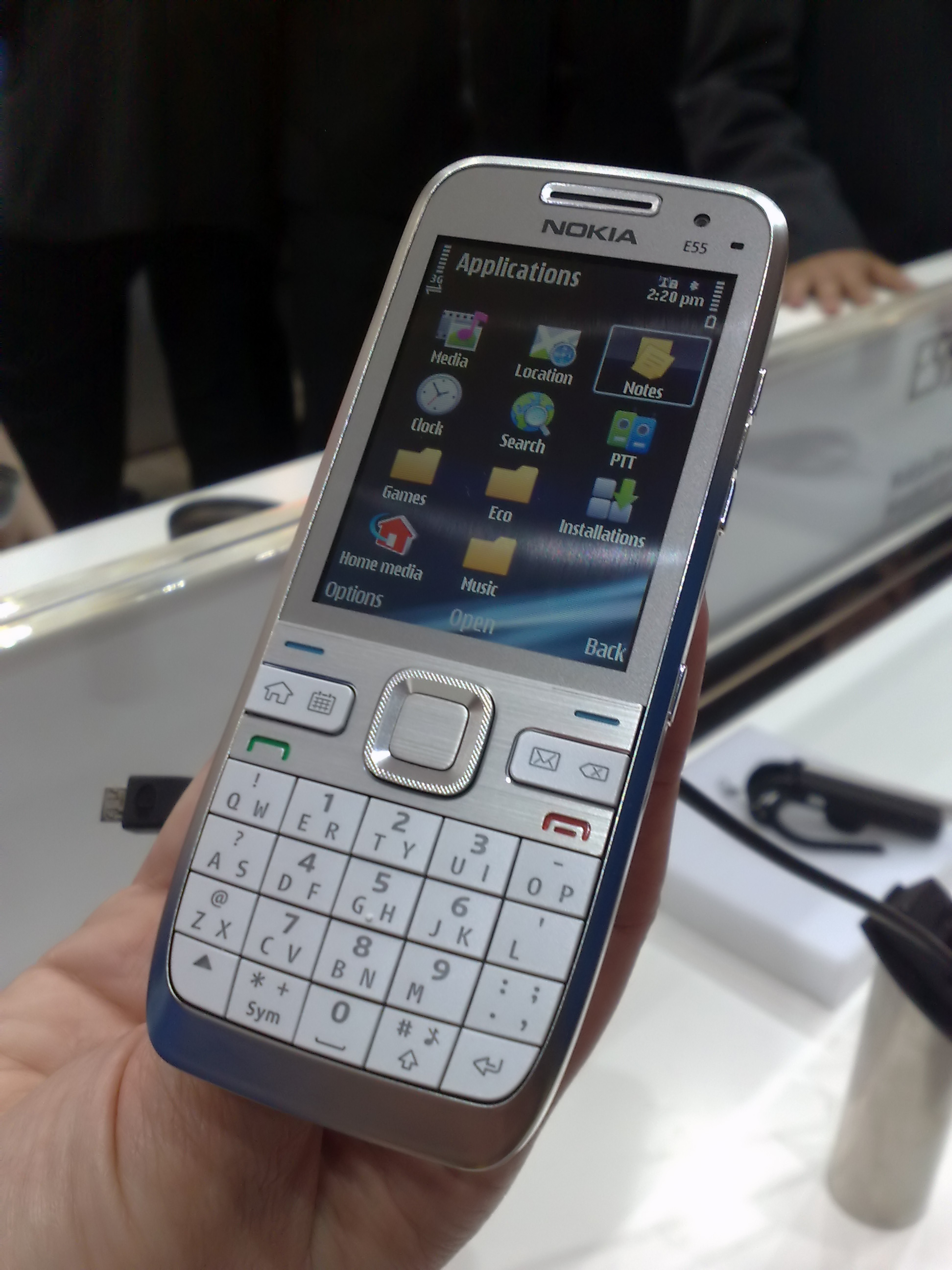
- The Nokia E52 (top) and Nokia E55 (below). The E55, despite being a higher number, was announced before the E52.
- Manufacturer: Nokia
- Series: Nokia Eseries
- Availability by region: July 2009
- Predecessor: Nokia E51
- Successor: Nokia E5-00
- Related: Nokia E72; Nokia 6720 classic
- Compatible networks: Quad band (GSM / GPRS / EDGE): GSM-850, GSM-900, GSM-1800 and GSM-1900; Dual band (UMTS / HSDPA): UMTS-900 and UMTS-2100; UMTS-850 and UMTS-1900; UMTS-850 and UMTS-2100
- Form factor: Candybar phone
- Dimensions: 116 × 49 × 9.9 millimeters
- Weight: 98 g
- Operating system: S60 3rd Edition, Feature Pack 2 on Symbian OS 9.3
- CPU: ARM11; 600 MHz
- Memory: 60 MB (built-in)
- Removable storage: MicroSDHC (up to 32 GB); Hot-swappable
- Battery: BP-4L, 3.7V 1500 mAh lithium-polymer
- Rear camera: Back-mounted; 3.2 megapixels (2048 × 1536 pixels) with fixed focus (Extended Depth of field) and flash. It supports VGA video recording up to 15fps
- Front camera: Front-mounted; 0.0768 megapixels (240 × 320 pixels)
- Display: 240 × 320 pixels, 2.4 inches, 16.7 million colors
- Media: MP3, WMA, AAC, AAC+, eAAC+, AMR-NB and audio streaming
- Connectivity: Wireless LAN (IEEE 802.11b/g); GPS; Assisted GPS; Bluetooth v2.0; microUSB; 3.5 mm Nokia AV connector
- Data inputs: Numeric keyboard and five-way joystick
- Other: Firmware Over-The-Air (FOTA) technology; Virtual Private Network

The Nokia E52 and Nokia E55 are mobile phones from Nokia's business-oriented Eseries range. They run Symbian OS v9.3 (S60 3rd Edition FP1). The E55 was announced on 16 February 2009, whilst the E52 was announced later on 6 May 2009. They are both physically and functionally identical, except that the E55 has a 'half-QWERTY' keyboard, similar to the SureType keyboard on BlackBerry Pearl, whereas the E52 revision has a traditional T9 keypad.

They are available in Black, Black Aluminum, Metal Grey aluminium, White Aluminium and Gold. They came with a 1 GB microSD memory card, but also support microSD cards with up to 32 GB memory. They have 60 MB of free user memory. The E52 is the successor to Nokia's successful E51 model. The latest firmware version is v091.004, released on June 2, 2012.

The E52 and E55 were, at 9.9 mm thickness, very slim for its time, and feature mostly metallic bodies. Nokia called the E55 the world's thinnest smartphone (it was just 0.1 mm thinner than Nokia E71). The E55 model has a unique 'compact' QWERTY keyboard featuring two letters in the QWERTY order on a single key.
