= Nokia 6500 classic =

2007 cell phone model

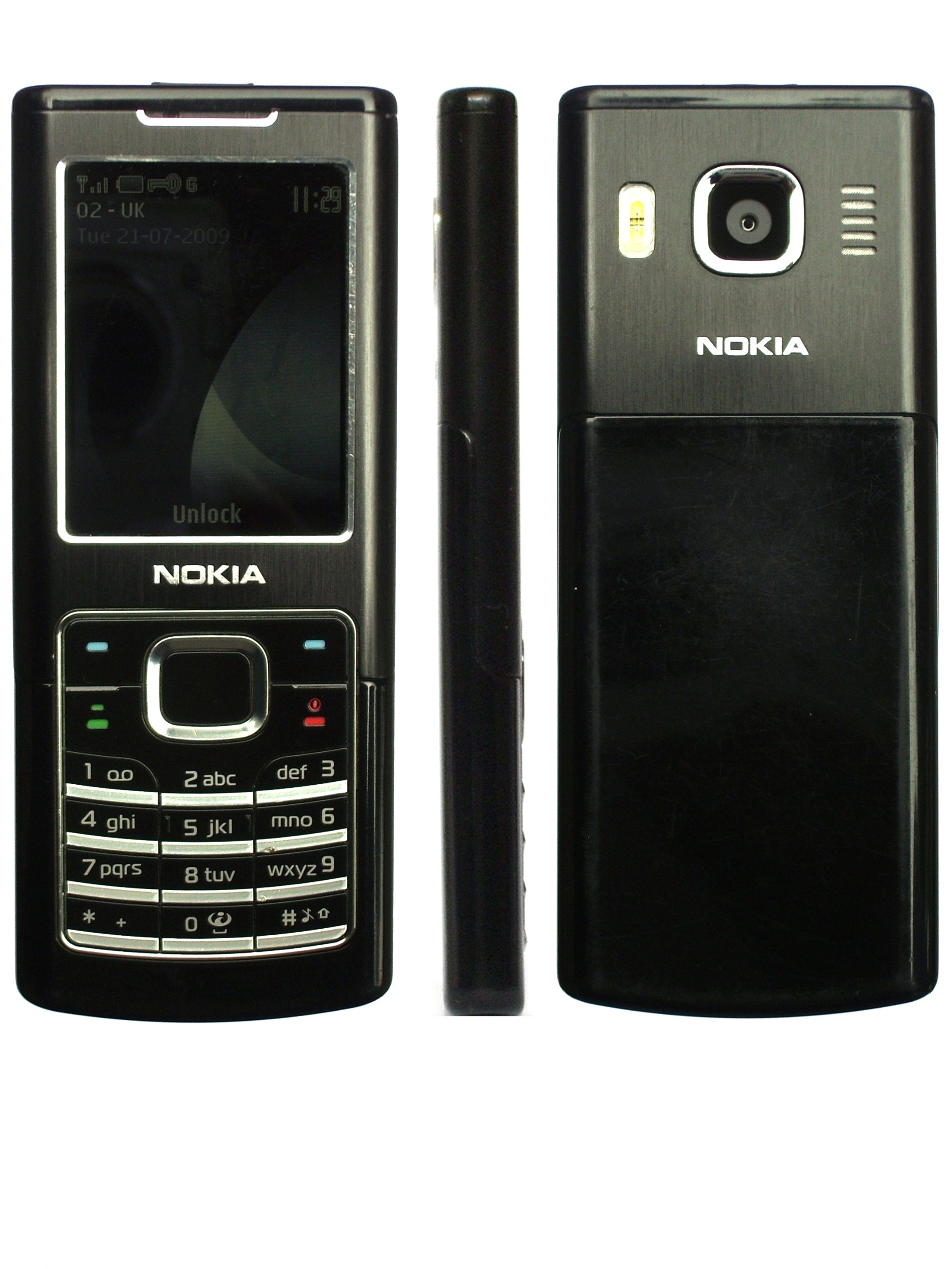
- Manufacturer: Nokia
- Availability by region: September 2007
- Discontinued: Q2 2011
- Predecessor: Nokia 6233
- Successor: Nokia 6700 classic
- Related: Nokia 5310; Nokia 6300; Nokia 6500 slide Nokia 7900
- Compatible networks: WCDMA 850/2100 GSM/EGSM 850/900/1800/1900
- Form factor: Candybar
- Dimensions: 109.8×45×9.5 mm (4.32×1.77×0.37 in)
- Weight: 94 g (3 oz) (0.207 lb)
- Operating system: Series 40 5th edition
- Memory: 1 GB
- Battery: BL-6P 830 mAh
- Rear camera: 2.0 megapixels
- Display: 2 inch QVGA LCD (16 million colors)
- Connectivity: Bluetooth 2.0, Micro-USB
- Hearing aid compatibility: M2

The Nokia 6500 classic is a mobile phone from Nokia announced on May 31, 2007. The phone runs the Series 40 platform. The case is made of brushed aluminium. At just 9.5 mm thick, the 6500 classic was Nokia's thinnest phone when released in October 2007. It is notable for being Nokia's few Series 40 phones with a large internal memory, 1 GB (along with the Nokia 7900 and others). It also had a similar sliding variant called Nokia 6500 slide. Both of them were the first Nokia phones where the miniUSB port was replaced by microUSB.

In early 2011, Nokia stopped production of the 6500 classic handsets together with the 6300, albeit the slider version was discontinued earlier in 2009.
