= Nokia 207 =

2013 mobile phone model

- Brand: Nokia
- Manufacturer: Nokia
- Availability by region: October 2013
- Compatible networks: GSM (850, 900, 1800, 1900); HSDPA (900, 2100)
- Colors: Cyan, Red, Yellow, Black, White
- Dimensions: 114.2 mm × 50.9 mm × 12.8 mm (4.50 in × 2.00 in × 0.50 in)
- Weight: 91.3 g (3.22 oz)
- Operating system: Nokia Series 40
- Memory: 64 MB RAM
- Storage: 256 MB
- Removable storage: microSDHC, up to 32 GB (dedicated slot)
- Battery: Removable Li-Ion 1020 mAh battery (BL-5C)
- Rear camera: No
- Front camera: No
- Display: 2.4 in (61 mm) TFT LCD, 256K colors Resolution: 240 x 320 pixels, 4:3 ratio (~167 ppi density)
- Connectivity: Bluetooth 3.0, A2DP; Micro-USB 2.0
- SAR: 0.95 W/kg (head), 0.74 W/kg (body)

The Nokia 207 is a feature phone that was manufactured, branded, and marketed by Nokia, with support to social medias like Facebook, WhatsApp, Twitter, and YouTube. It was housed with a 2.4-inch QGVA display and a microSD expandable up to 32GB. With a battery capacity of 1020 mAh, it has a 33-day stand-by time.

It was available in Cyan, Red, Yellow, Black, and White color options.
