= Nokia 6800 series =

Range of cellular phones

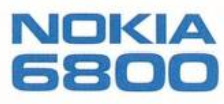

The Nokia 6800 series are a selection of Nokia Series 40 phones with an unusual fold-out QWERTY keyboard. This type of keyboard is also used in the more recent Nokia Series 60 Symbian-based Nokia E70. These phones were marketed as "messaging devices": all had built-in email clients, and some had BlackBerry support.

The 6800 and 6810 had four electrical contacts at the very top of the phone for the left side of the keyboard and another four just under the screen for when the regular 12-key numeric keypad was being used. A small magnet was built into the left side of the keyboard and the phones would switch to landscape mode as soon as this was lifted up. The 6820 and 6822 had the wiring for the keypad built into the hinges without any external contacts.

The 6800 series was superseded in May 2006 by the Nokia E70. This was essentially the business version of the 6800 devices, with significantly upgraded connectivity options, build and screen.

== Nokia 6800 ==
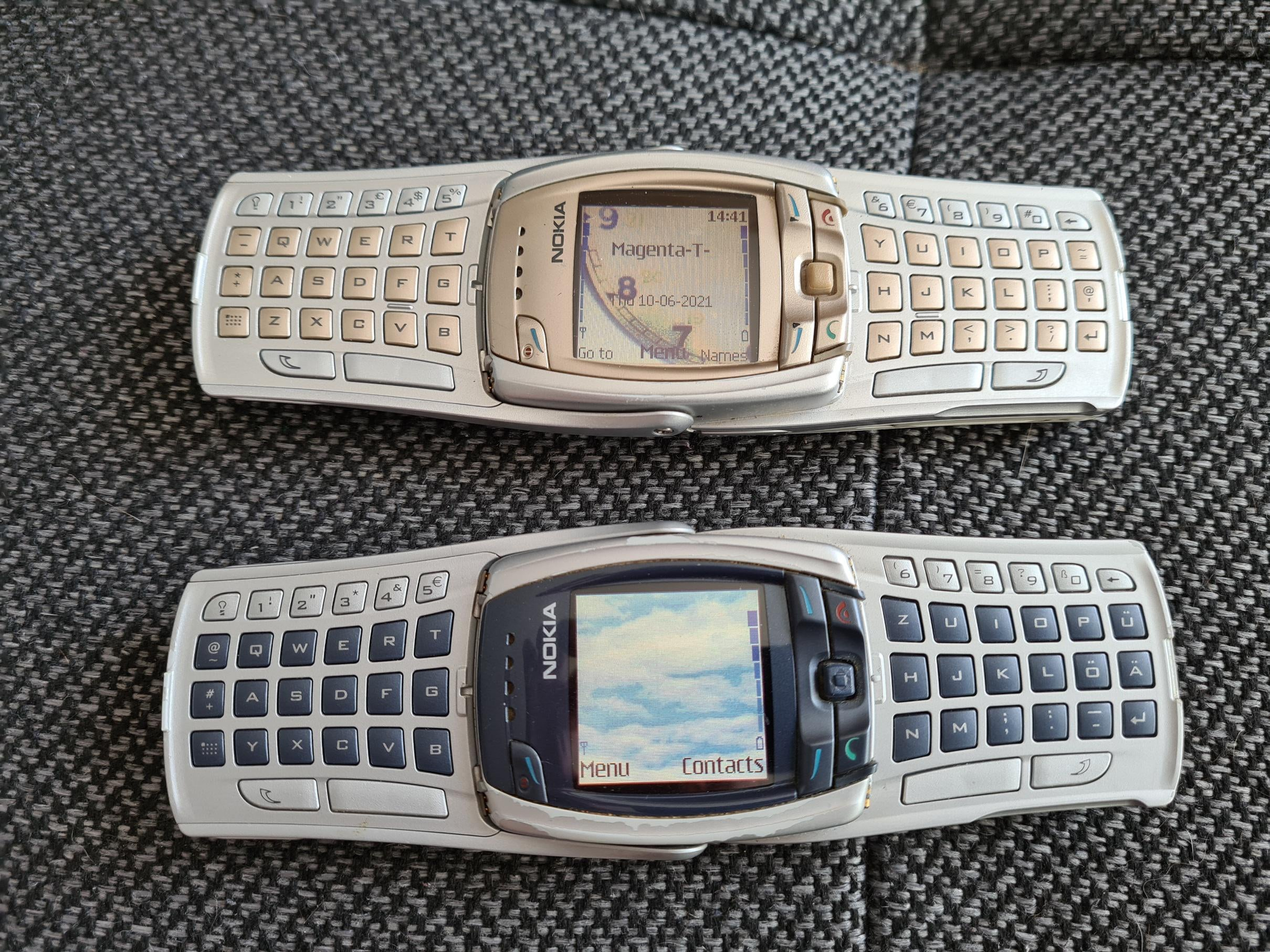
Nokia 6810 and 6800 with their keyboard unfolded

The 6800 was the first in the series and was a dual-band GSM 900/1800 phone with support for GPRS. The 6800 had an FM radio tuner and 5MB of memory. It was announced on 4 November 2002.

== Nokia 6810 ==
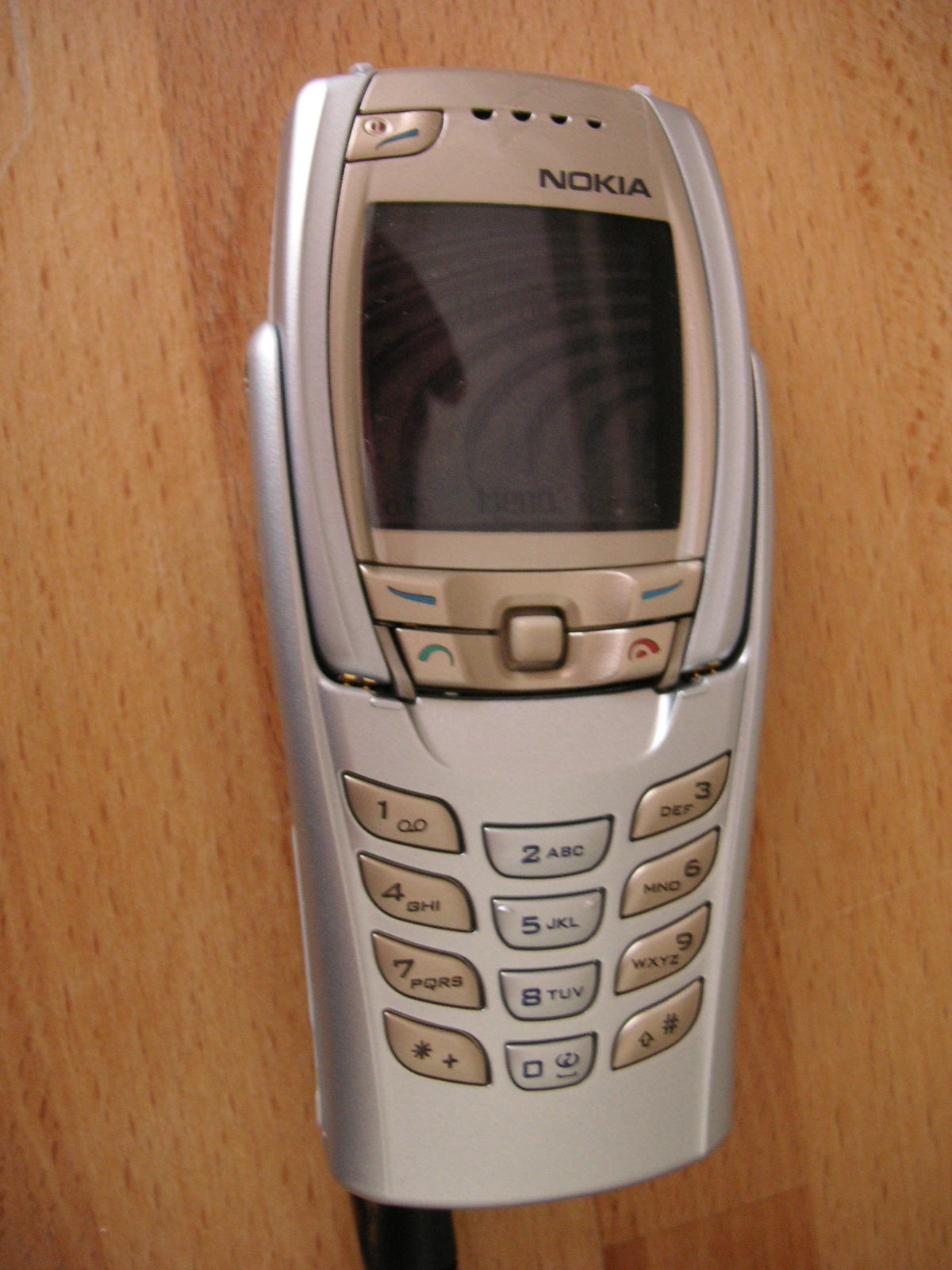
A Nokia 6810

A slightly updated GSM 900/1800/1900 tri-band version of the 6800, the 6810 had gold-coloured keys and a gold-coloured border around the screen. The 6810 had support for Bluetooth, EDGE, BlackBerry email and Wireless Village. This phone was rarely seen for sale in shops and was marketed to businesses as a replacement for the Nokia 6310i. Though announced at the same time as the 6820, it only became available about six months later.

== Nokia 6820 ==
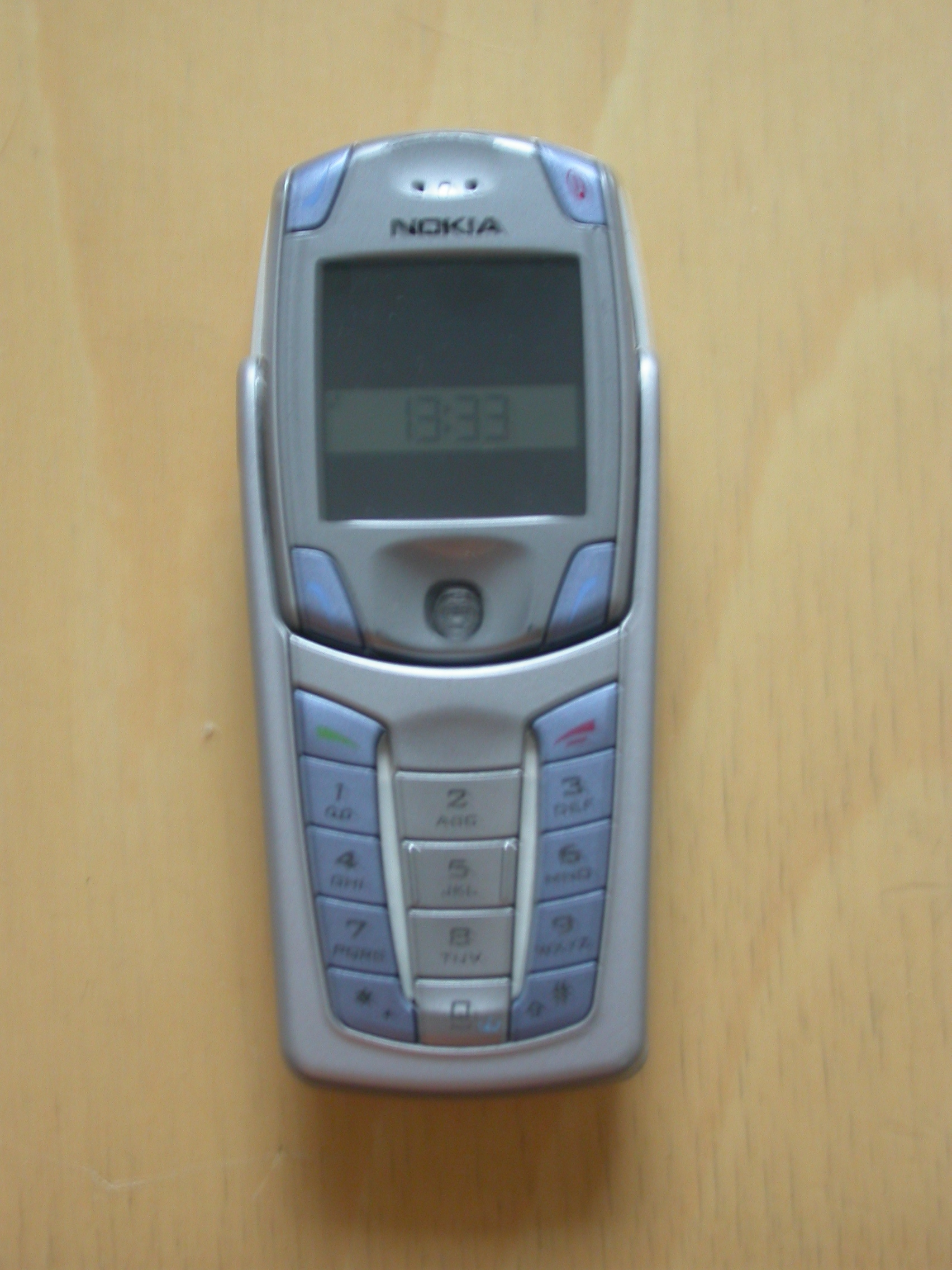
A Nokia 6820

The 6820 was the most popular phone in the series and was often stocked in shops when it was released early in 2004. This phone was smaller than the previous models, with much smaller and more closely spaced keys. A variant, the 6820b, was marketed in North America with support for the 850MHz GSM band instead of the 900MHz band used by the 6820. The 6820 was functionally identical to the 6810 except for a 352x288 camera instead of the built-in radio.

== Nokia 6822 ==
Released in early 2005 and based on the same design as the 6820, the 6822 was light silver in colour and so were all the keys. The only difference was the higher resolution camera (640x480) and 65536 colour display instead of 4096. By the time it was released, the 3.5MB of memory it had was considered insufficient and the phone was not on the market for long. The 6822 supports 900/1800/1900 MHz frequencies; the 6822b variant supports the US 850/1800/1900 MHz.
