= Nokia 6230 =

Cell phone model

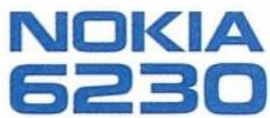

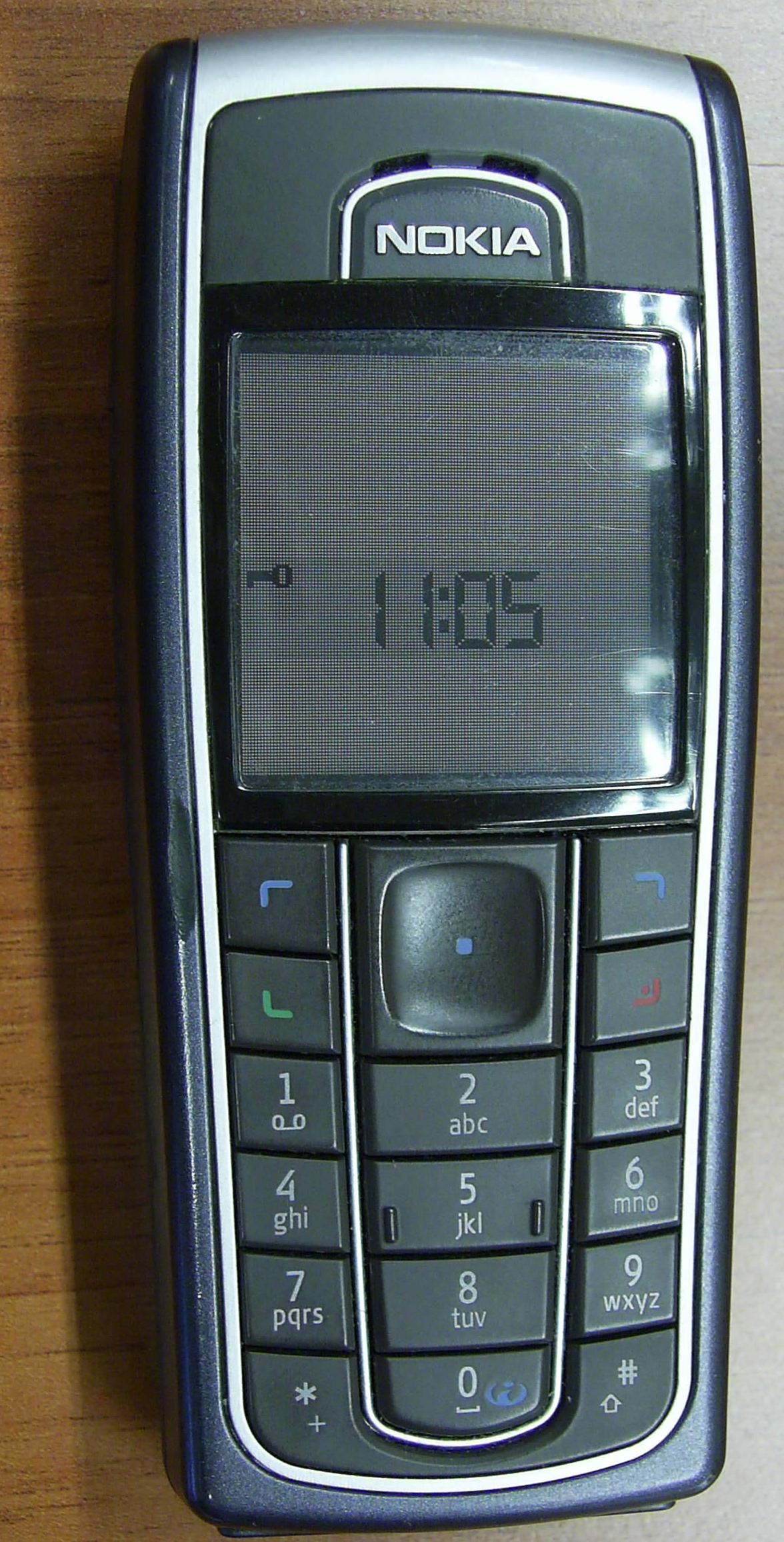
- Manufacturer: Nokia
- Availability by region: Q1 2004
- Predecessor: Nokia 6100; Nokia 6310i Nokia 6610
- Successor: Nokia 6020; Nokia 6070; Nokia 6230i Nokia 6233; Nokia E50; Nokia E60
- Compatible networks: Nokia 6230 RH-12 - GSM 900/1800/1900 MHz. Nokia 6230b RH-28 - GSM 850/1800/1900 MHz for the North American market.
- Form factor: Candybar
- Dimensions: 103×44×20 mm (4.06×1.73×0.79 in), 76 cc
- Operating system: Series 40
- Memory: 6 MB shared memory
- Removable storage: MultiMediaCard
- Battery: Nokia BL-5C; Li-Ion 850 mAh
- Rear camera: Nokia 6230 - 0.3 MegaPixel. Nokia 6230i - 1.3 MegaPixel.
- Front camera: No
- Display: Active TFT, 65K colors, 128 x 128 pixels, 5 lines, 27 x 27 mm
- Connectivity: GPRS Class 10 (4+1/3+2 slots) 32 - 48 kbit/s. HSCSD 43.2 kbit/s. EDGE Class 10, 236.8 kbit/s. Bluetooth v1.1, Infrared port. USB via Pop-Port.
- Other: SAR Nokia 6230 (Type RH-12): 0.59 W/kg; Nokia 6230 (Type RH-28): 0.29 W/kg

The Nokia 6230 is a mobile phone based on the Nokia Series 40 platform. It was announced on 28 October 2003 and released on 24 February 2004.

Designed with business users in mind, the 6230 comes with a VGA‑resolution digital camera, a video camera, a music player, and expandable memory.

Cingular Wireless was the primary GSM carrier that offered the Nokia 6230b in the United States. Other companies such as Cincinnati Bell, Simmetry Communications, Viaero Wireless, and Telcel also offered this model.

== Features ==
The Nokia 6230 features a 16-bit TFT color screen with a resolution of 128×128 pixels, as well as a VGA camera capable of recording video clips in H.263 (SubQCIF) format at 128×96 pixels and 15 FPS. The phone is equipped with built-in Bluetooth wireless technology, an FM radio (which requires a wired headset attached to the Pop-Port interface to act as an antenna), and supports playback of 3GP video/audio at up to 30 FPS, as well as MP3, AAC, and AMR audio formats. Additionally, it is EGPRS (EDGE) capable, offering speeds up to 220 kbit/s. The phone also features changeable Xpress-on covers, which were available for purchase.

It uses an extended Li-Ion Battery of 850 mAh. The 6230 accepts MMC memory cards up to 4 GB in capacity formatted in FAT32 or FAT16 file systems (supported by later firmware releases) on which multimedia files and data can be stored. SD cards are not supported. It operates on either GSM 900/1800/1900 MHz (Nokia 6230 RH-12), or GSM 850/1800/1900 MHz (Nokia 6230b RH-28) for the North American market.

It was the first non-smartphone from Nokia with an expandable memory card slot and was usually supplied with a 32 MB MMC card. The first non-smartphone with expandable memory was the Siemens SL45, introduced in 2001.

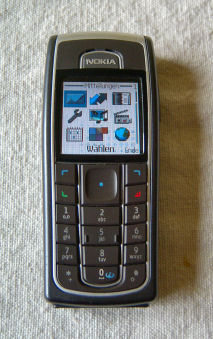
A black Nokia 6230

== Nokia 6230i ==
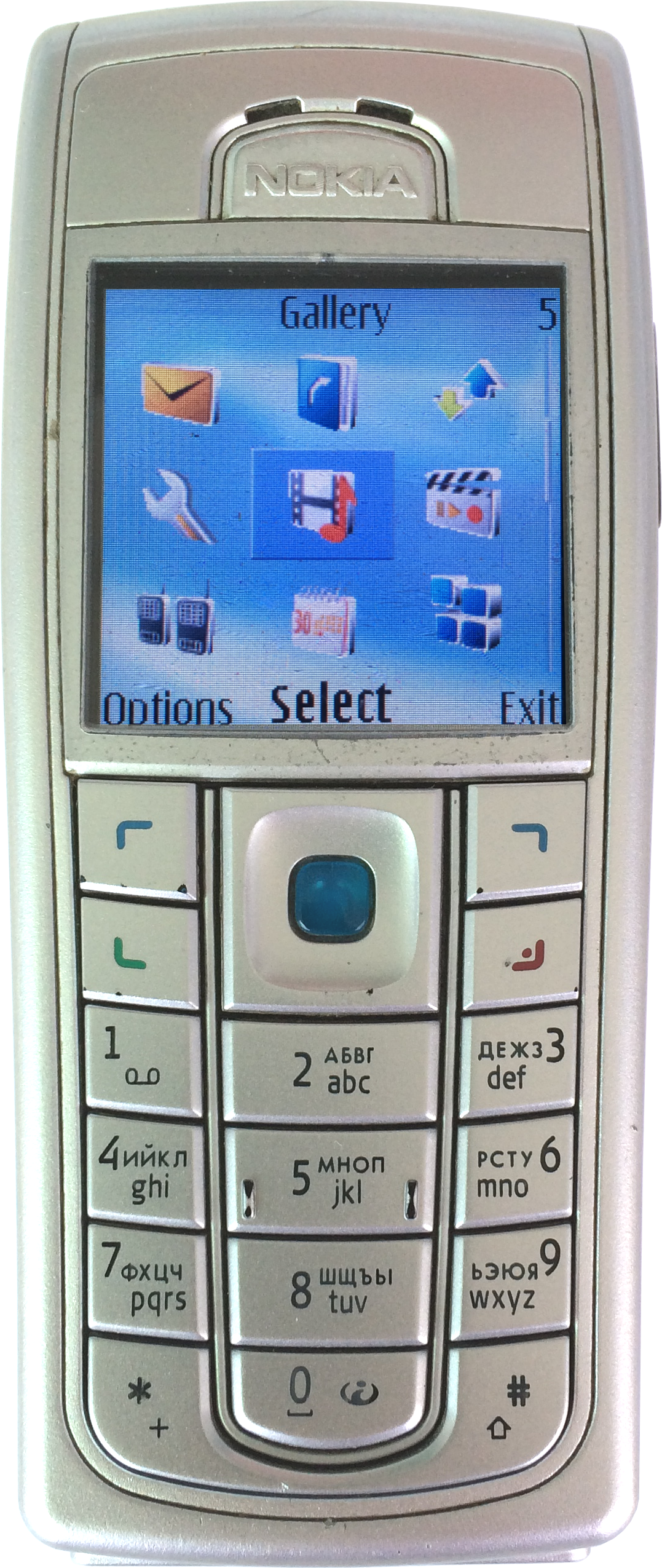
Nokia 6230i

On February 28, 2005, Nokia released an updated 6230i model (RM-72) that included a 1.3-megapixel camera instead of a 0.3-megapixel one, 208×208 screen resolution (65,536 colours), a slightly larger display (1.7 inches), a raised selection button in the midst of the scroll key, and a redesigned menu.

It is also standard UMS (USB mass storage device class) compliant, meaning no proprietary drivers are required to transfer data to and from the device's memory card. It weighs 99 g (including the BL-5C battery), its dimensions are 103 mm x 44 mm x 20 mm (76 cc).

The BL-5C battery that comes standard with it will last about 150–300 hours, depending on usage.

This model was available only in GSM 900/1800/1900 MHz; Nokia did not release an 850 MHz version for the North American market.

The next model in the 623x series was the 3G GSM/WCDMA Nokia 6233.

=== Appearance ===
The graphical user interface was overhauled, and many of the icons featured on the 6230i are the same as those later used uniformly across almost all new Nokia phones. Notably, the menu icons on the Nokia 6230i are animated, as opposed to the previous model, which were static.

The phone has seven built-in themes ('Basic', 'Circle', 'DotSpace', 'Dots2', 'Microdots', 'Waves', and 'Window'), and users can download more. In addition, users may customise the colour of the borders, and the battery and signal bars.

The operating system runs more slowly than on the 6230, possibly due to the increased processor drain of the higher-resolution screen. Nokia also removed several options from menus, such as brightness control, and the ability to automatically overwrite text messages in the Inbox/Sent Folders. These changes prompted widespread complaints.

=== Security ===
The phone can automatically lock after a set time, starting from five seconds of no activity. In addition to the auto-lock, users can lock with a 'keyguard', which prevents unauthorised use of the phone. The code it uses is the standard security code. If the user enters this code incorrectly for five times, the phone is 'locked out', meaning no one can gain access for five minutes.

Users can choose to protect their phone by enabling a PIN. When enabled, the phone will prompt users to enter the PIN, and on success, the phone will grant access. Users can also protect their SIM card, which is standard practice for mobile devices.

=== Organization ===
The Nokia 6230i has organizing software, such as a calendar, alarm clock, to-do list, notes, and wallet. The wallet is a password-protected area where users can store bank card details, tickets, receipts, and personal notes. Users can set different profiles within the Wallet, for example, “work” or “personal”, allowing different card details to be stored. There is an e-mail application, but it must be set up by the user's mobile phone network.

=== Phone book ===
Further to storing mobile numbers, users can add e-mail addresses, home phone numbers, an image (which shows when a contact calls), PTT addresses, postal addresses, web addresses, notes, and user identification.

Contacts can be grouped, for example, “colleagues” but such groups do not appear to be usable for text messaging. There is a Distribution List feature under Messages that allows users to send group SMS (only available on the 6210).

Users can add up to sixteen voice commands (also known as “voice tags”), allowing them to say a contact's name and have the phone automatically call that contact (provided a voice tag has been individually assigned).

=== Connectivity ===
The Nokia 6230i is GPRS enabled. It features GPRS Class 10 connectivity, offering speeds of up to 48 kbit/s. It is also EDGE enabled at Class 10, providing speeds of up to 236.8 kbit/s. The device includes an infrared port and is Bluetooth enabled, making it one of the few phones to feature both infrared and Bluetooth.

=== Media ===
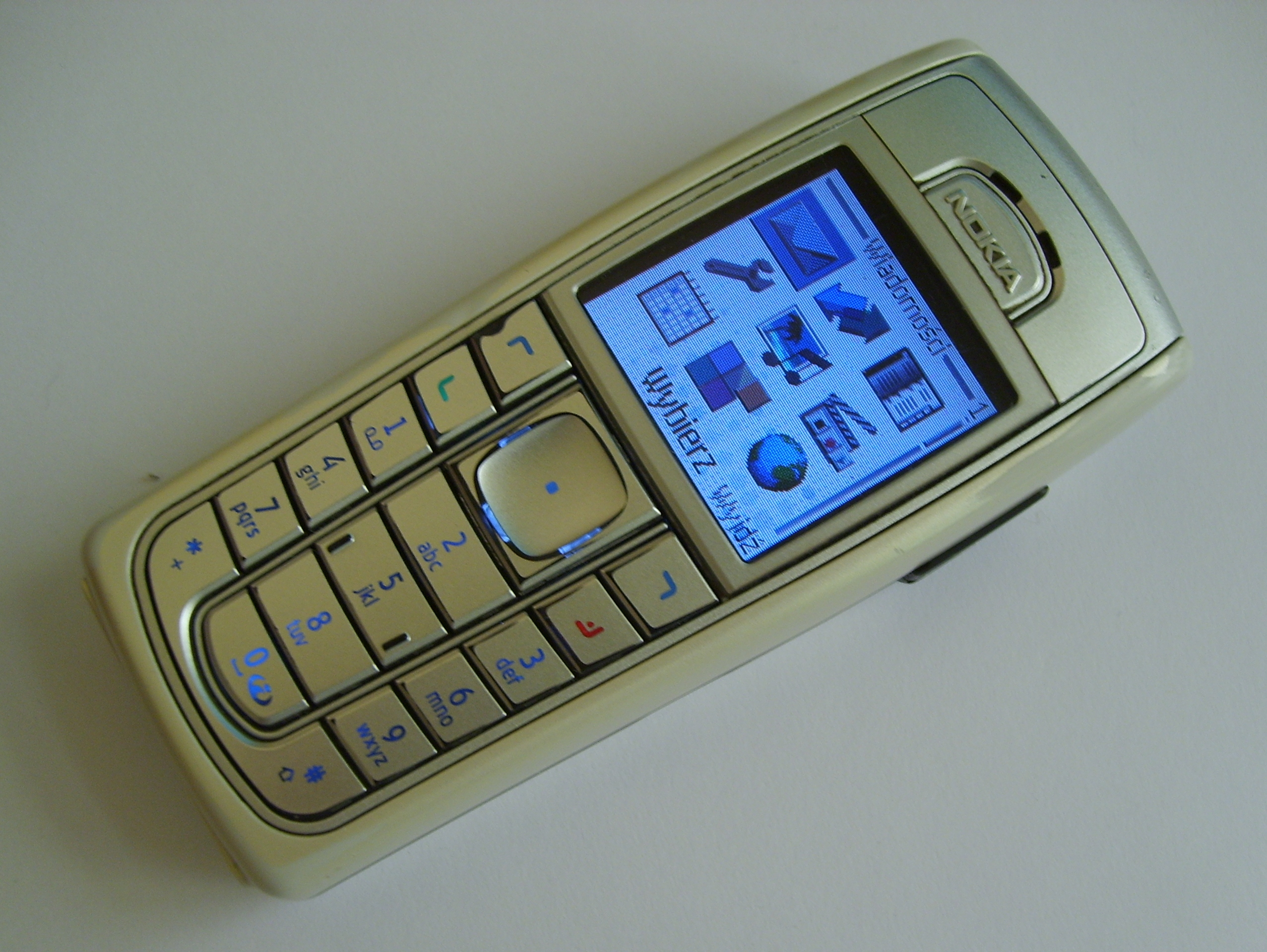
A silver Nokia 6230

The Nokia 6230i features an integrated music player which can play MP3 and AAC (Advanced Audio Coding) format files. The music player has an inbuilt Graphic Equalizer and the ability to create and save custom equalizers. Up to seven different equalizer settings are available. The phone plays high-quality audio. The music players also includes the ability to play music via Bluetooth. It included the song "Strange Transmissions" by Norah Jones and the Peter Malick Group. It also includes a media player for video playback in 3GP format. The video recording is done in 3GP format as well. The phone also includes a radio (a connected headset is required) in which 20 radio channels can be saved. Frequencies can be auto-tuned. The Nokia 6230i also features a Voice Recorder with up to 60 minutes of voice recording.

=== Push to talk (PTT) ===
The Nokia 6230i features Push-to-Talk (PTT), which functions as a two-way radio. The PTT option is available only if enabled by the service provider.

=== Extra applications ===
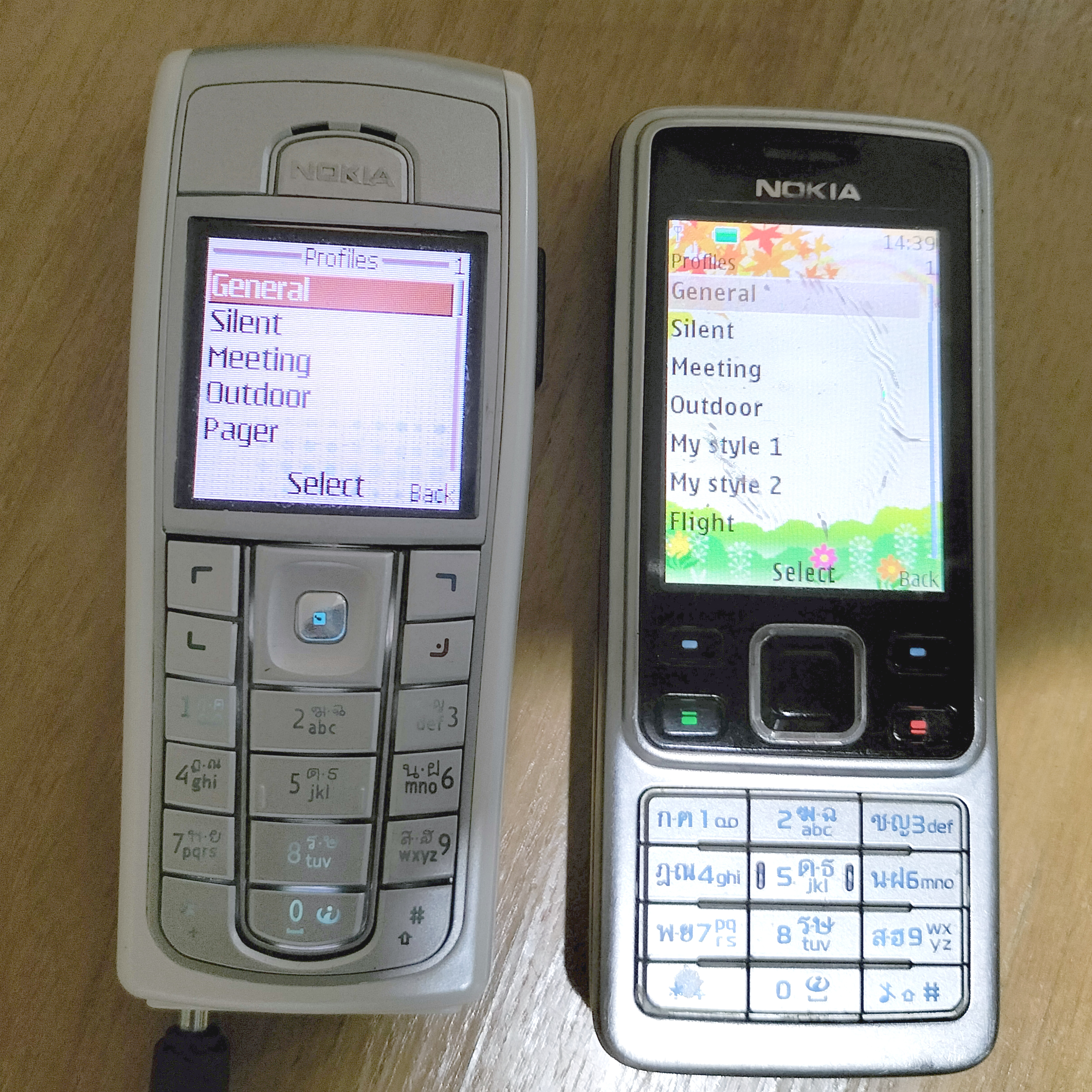
A Nokia 6230 next to a Nokia 6300, displaying the Profiles menu.

The phone also includes a basic calculator, countdown timer, and a stopwatch, which has two settings: “Split timing” and “Lap timing”. Both allow users to save and name their times. It also features an integrated message counter, which tracks the number of messages sent and received. Another application, called the GPRS data counter, displays the data received and sent during each session, as well as the total for all sessions combined. The GPRS connection timer registers the duration of each session. The phone also supports speed dials; up to nine numbers can be assigned for speed dialing.

=== Collection folder ===
Users can download new applications (through WAP), which are stored in a folder named “Collections”. However, Nokia included three applications. “World Clock II” allows users to view time zones across the world; graphical user interface highlights the current time zone in yellow and allows users to navigate left or right across the world, showing the city at the centre of the time zone. “Converter II” is an application for converting units such as currencies, grams, pounds, and more. Through the “Options” menu, users can customise conversions to suit their needs—especially useful when currency values fluctuate. The final application is a translation tool, “Translator”. For example, if a search query is “help”, the application will show five translations: English, French, German, Spanish, and Italian. The phone is limited to 2 MB of applications, regardless of the size of the Multimedia Card or internal memory.

=== Bugs ===
A few bugs have been reported with this phone:

- When using a Bluetooth audio device together with voice tags, the ringing tone is always ascending, even when ascending is not selected. The only temporary solution is to reset the phone, although the issue reappears when Bluetooth and voice tags are used again. This bug is still present in the latest firmware.
- Sometimes, the display lights up for a few seconds and then goes dark again. This occurs when the battery depletes by one “bar”, which may be seen as counterproductive, as the illumination increases battery drain. This behaviour was intended as an early warning for low battery.
- Occasionally, for no apparent reason, an image or video clip is duplicated.
- In the music player, when selecting an entry in the playlist at a position higher than 255, the player exhibits a wrap-around bug and plays the entry 255 positions earlier than the one selected. For example, if entry 260 is selected, entry 5 will be played; if entry 300 is selected, entry 45 will be played. This is caused by the music player using an unsigned 8-bit integer to store the selected track. This bug is present on the 6230, 6230i, and early versions of the 6233. The workaround is to use the playlist to identify the entry number, then return to the currently playing entry and manually enter the desired number (jump to).
- On newer firmware versions of the 6230i, the camera is unable to process images larger than 786 KB. This occurs when taking pictures at top quality settings in 1280×1024 mode of scenes with fine detail, such as tree foliage. Users may receive a message like “Unable to save”, as the image processor lacks sufficient memory to compress the JPEG file from the sensor data.
- While the 6230i can use a 4 GB MMC card (if formatted with FAT16), it fails to enter mass storage mode when such a card is present.
- On older versions of the BL-5C battery, internal chemicals could leak or react during prolonged charging. Although rare, Nokia offered a free replacement.
- When the phone is left on for extended periods, the ringer volume is set to low, regardless of the user’s settings.

== Reception ==
British review site S21 gave the phone 3 stars out of 5. It stated that the phone is highly recommended and a "significant improvement" over the Nokia 6220, but criticised its poor quality screen.

== See also ==
- List of Nokia products
- Nokia 6233
