= Nokia Eseries =

Series of mobile phones by Nokia

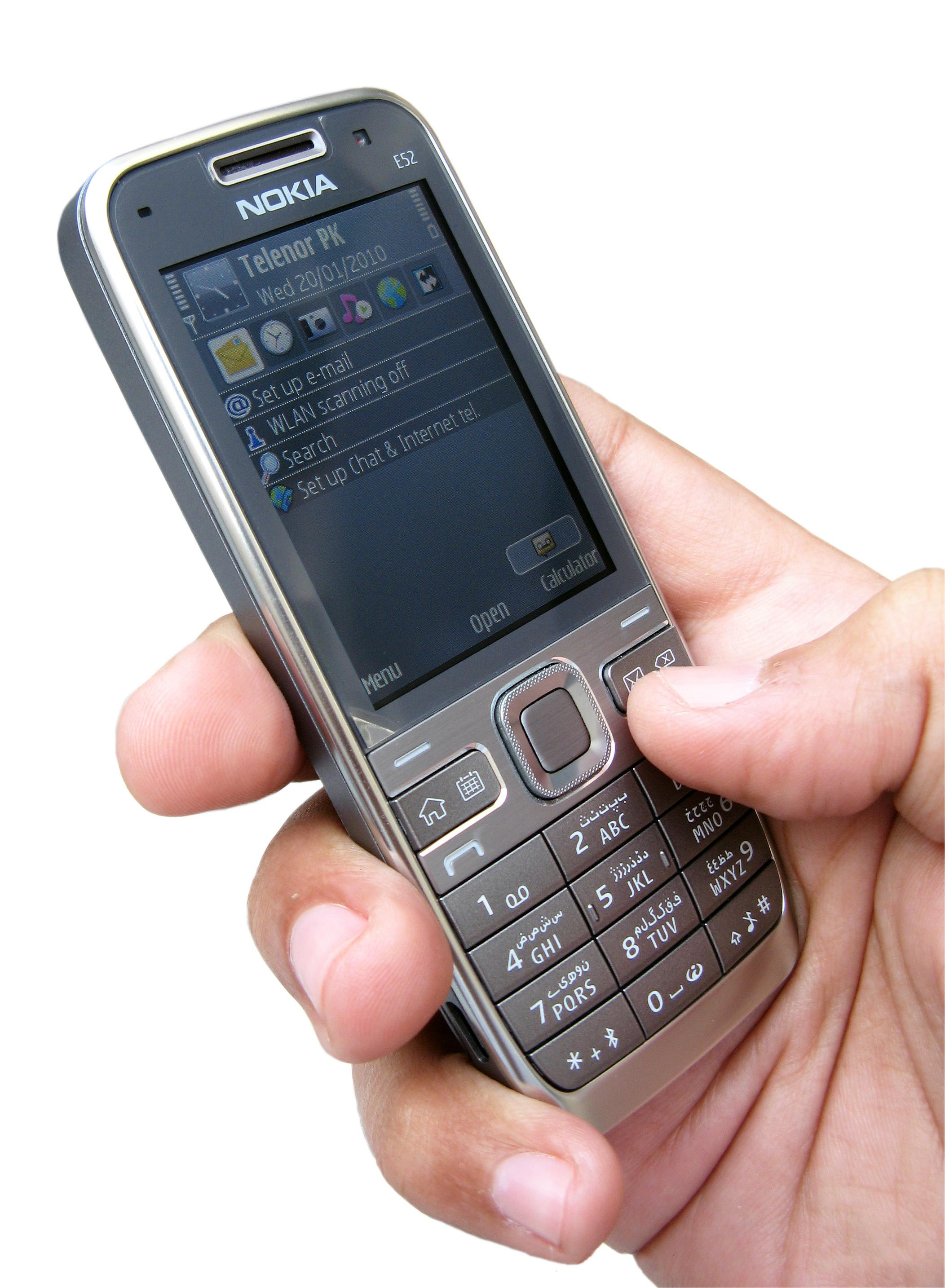
Nokia E52

The Nokia Eseries is a discontinued line of business-oriented smartphones running Symbian OS, produced by Nokia from 2005 to 2011. The Eseries brand became the partial replacement for the top-line products of the Nokia 6000 'Classic Business' range - the 6000 range itself would turn into a mid-range line with broad appeal beginning in 2007 mostly using the 'classic', 'slide' and 'fold' monikers.

The Nokia Eseries have emphasis on enhanced connectivity and support for corporate e-mail push services, as well as enterprise-styled products and many featuring QWERTY keyboards. All devices have advanced office features through its S60 platform. Phones equipped with Wireless LAN also provide a VoIP client (SIP Protocol). Throughout the series' lifetime, its main competitors include the BlackBerry, the Sony Ericsson P family, and various Windows Mobile/Pocket PC devices.

== Models ==
On October 12, 2005, Nokia announced what the company refers to as the Eseries, consisting of the three mobile phones, the Nokia E60, Nokia E61 and Nokia E70.

On May 18, 2006, Nokia announced the addition of the E50 to the series, which it refers to as a "business device" rather than a "smartphone".

On February 12, 2007, Nokia introduces three new devices to the series; E61i, E65 and E90 Communicator.

On April 11, 2008, Nokia Australia has advised that the E61i will be discontinued in May 2008 and be replaced by a more featured but smaller E71. Later releases included, E63, E72, E75, E52 and E5.

The last Eseries device was the Nokia E7 from 2011.

== See also ==
- Nokia phone series#List of Eseries devices
