= Nokia E50 =

2006 mobile phone model by Nokia

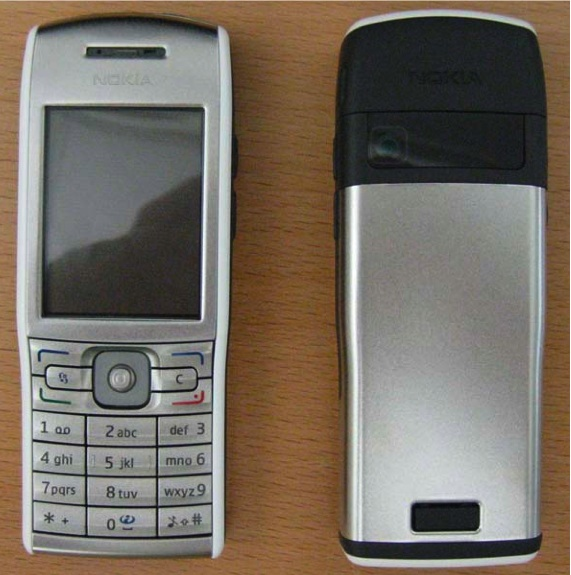
- Model E50-1 with camera
- Manufacturer: Nokia
- Predecessor: Nokia 6230
- Successor: Nokia E51
- Related: Nokia E60
- Compatible networks: EGSM 850/900/1800/1900
- Form factor: Candybar
- Dimensions: 113 × 43.5 × 15.5 millimeters
- Weight: 104 g (4 oz) (0.229 lb)
- Operating system: S60 3rd edition on Symbian OS v9.1
- CPU: ARM 9 @ 235 MHz
- Memory: 70 MB (internal)
- Removable storage: MicroSD
- Battery: BL-5C (970 mAh) or BL-6C (1150 mAh)
- Rear camera: 1,280 × 960 pixels (1.3-megapixel), 4× digital zoom
- Display: 2.06 in, 31 × 42 mm, 240 × 320 pixels, Active Matrix, 262,144 colours
- Connectivity: USB Mass Storage via Pop-Port, Bluetooth 2.0, Infrared

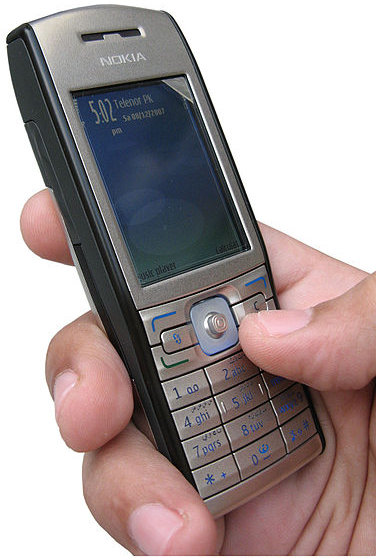
Nokia E50 in hand

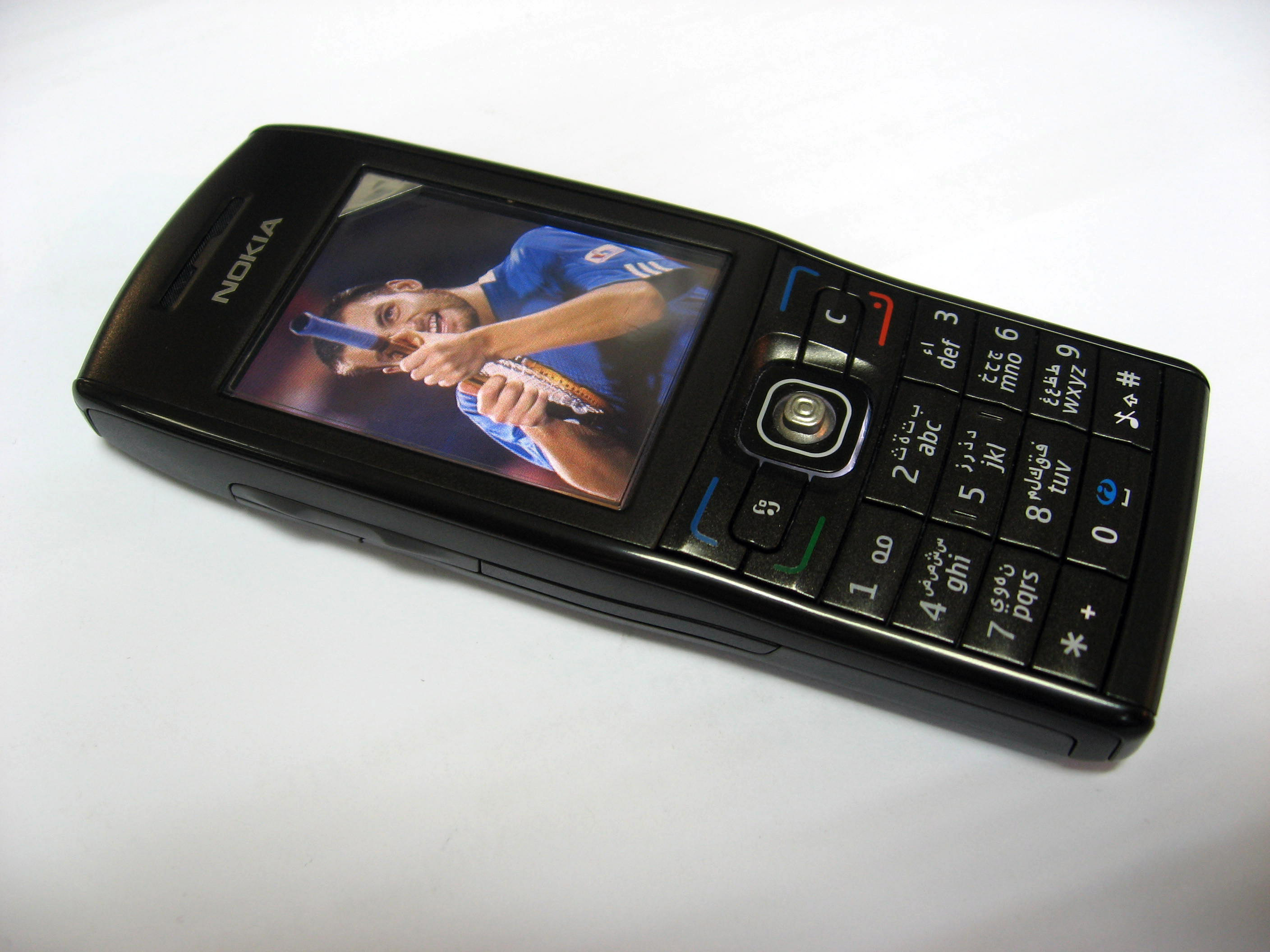
Nokia E50 Metal Black

The Nokia E50 Business Device is a bar-style monoblock quad-band mobile phone from Nokia announced 18 May 2006 as part of the Eseries, intended primarily for the corporate business market. It includes sophisticated e-mail support for Nokia's Intellisync Wireless Email, BlackBerry Connect, Visto Mobile, Activesync Mail for Exchange, Altexia as well as IMAP4. It also has the ability to view Microsoft Word, PowerPoint, and Excel attachments, and PDF documents but it cannot be used for editing these without additional apps. An application manager downloads, removes and installs both Nokia and third-party applications. Device to device synchronization is possible with Data transfer application. Features include EDGE, Bluetooth 2.0, a 1,280 × 960 pixels (1.3-megapixel) camera, a MicroSD memory-card slot, and digital music and video player functionality through RealPlayer and Flash Player. This unit does not support UMTS, Wi-Fi, or FM radio.

It uses the third edition of the Series 60 user-interface (S60v3) and the Symbian operating system version 9.1. It is not binary compatible with software compiled for earlier versions of the Symbian operating system.

== Versions ==
Check firmware

*#0000#

V 07.36.0.0

- Nokia model E50-1 / RM-170 (with camera)
- Nokia model E50-2 / RM-171 (without camera)
- Nokia model E50 Metal Black, available in selected markets.

== Specifications sheet ==
Feature	Specification
Form factor	Candybar / Monoblock
Operating System	Symbian OS (9.1) + Series 60 v3
GSM frequencies	850/900/1800/1900 MHz
GPRS	Yes, class 10
EDGE (EGPRS)	Yes, class 10
3G	No
UMTS/WCDMA	No
WLAN/WiFi	No
PG.R.S. support	Yes
Main screen	Active Matrix, 262 144 colours, 240 × 320 pixels, adjustable brightness
Camera (optional)	1,280 × 960 pixels (1.3-megapixel), 4x digital zoom
Video recording	Yes 176 × 144 or 128 × 96, 15 frames per second, up to one hour
Voice recording	Yes
Multimedia Messaging	Yes
Video calls	No
Push to talk	Yes (Push to Talk over Cellular – PoC)
Java support	Yes, MIDP 2.0
Built-in memory	70 MB
Memory card slot	Yes, MicroSD/TransFlash max. 2 GB
Hot Swappable Memory card slot	Yes
Bluetooth	Yes v2.0 + EDR
Infrared	Yes
USB Mass Storage	Yes, via Pop-Port
Data cable support	Yes
Browser	WAP 2.0 XHTML / HTML. Comes standard with a full Nokia Mini Map Browser
Email	Yes
Music player	Yes, stereo
Radio FM	No
Video Player	Yes
Stereo Speakers	No
Ringtones	Yes, Polyphonic, Monophonic, MP3, True Tones
Vibrate	Yes
HandsFree (HF) speakerphone	Yes
Offline/Flight mode	Yes
Battery	BL-5C (970 mAh) or BL-6C (1,150 mAh)
Talk time	6.8 / 8 hours
Standby time	9 days / 10 days
Weight	104 grams
Dimensions	113 × 43.5 × 15.5 millimeters
Availability	Q3 2006
Else	Nokia PC Suite, iSync

=== BT profiles ===
Audio

- AVCTP-CT (Audio/Video Control Transport Protocol Controller)
- AVCTP-TG (Audio/Video Control Transport Protocol Target)
- AVRCP-TG (Audio Video Remote Control TG)
- GAVDP-ACP (Generic Audio/Video Distribution Profile Acceptor)
- GAVDP-INT (Generic Audio Video Distribution Initiator)
- HandsFree-AG (1.0) (HandsFree Audio Gateway)
- Headset-AG (Headset Audio Gateway)
- SIM Access-Server

File transfer

- FT-Server (File Transfer Server)

Photo

- BIP-ImagePush (Basic Imaging)

Generic

- GAP (Generic Access)

Internet/LAN

- DUN-GW (Dial-Up Networking Gateway)
- PAN-AP (Personal Area Networking Access Point)
- PAN-Group

Serial communication

- Serial-DevA
- Serial-DevB

Control

- HID-Host (Human Interface Device Host)

Business card

- OPP Client (Object Push Profile)
- OPP Server

== See also ==
- Smartphone
- Nokia Eseries
