= Nokia 6233 =

Mobile phone model

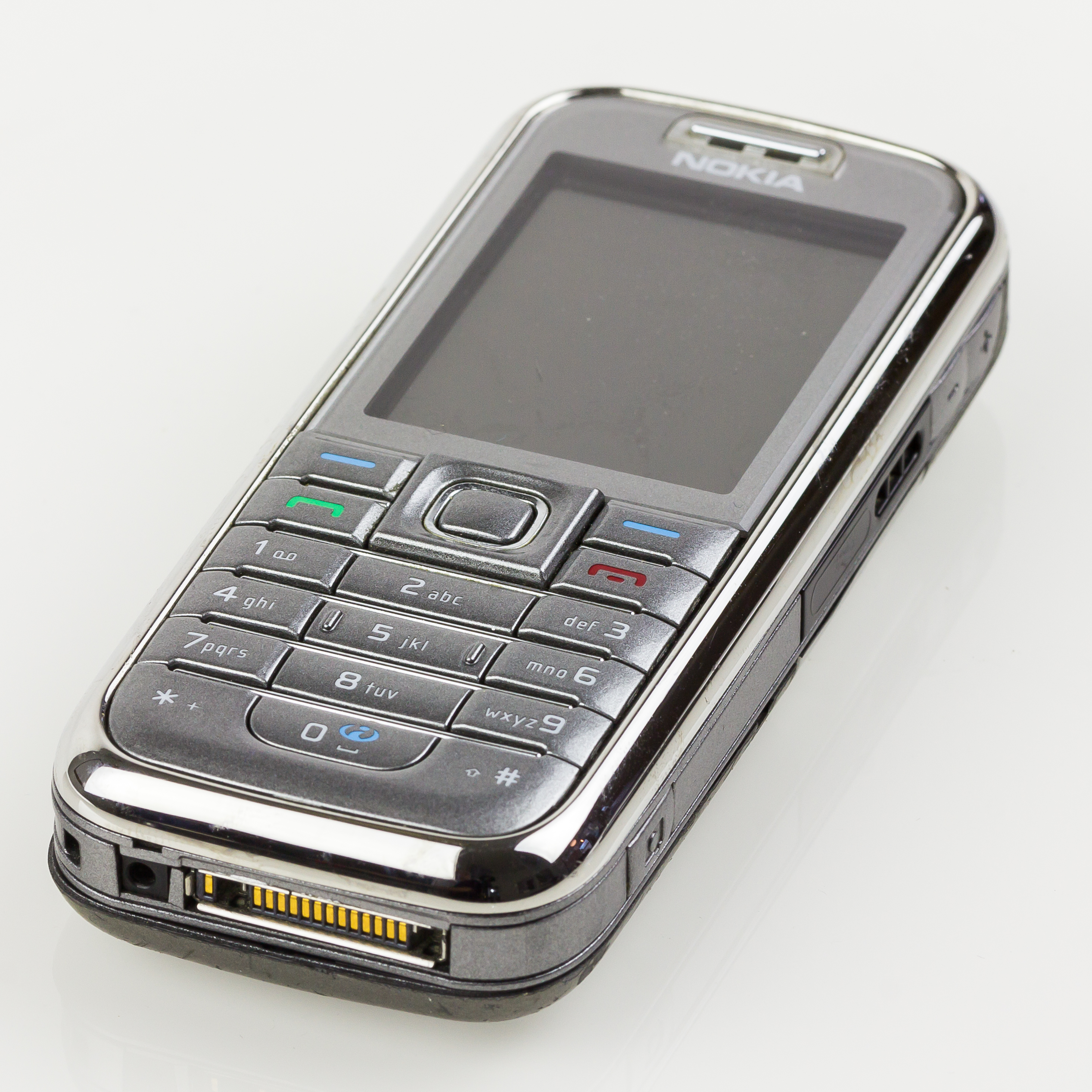
- Manufacturer: Nokia
- Availability by region: Q4 2005
- Discontinued: Q1 2009
- Predecessor: Nokia 6230
- Successor: Nokia 6120 classic Nokia 6500 classic
- Related: Nokia 6234
- Compatible networks: GSM 900/1800/1900 MHz, WCDMA 2100 MHz
- Form factor: Candybar
- Dimensions: 108×46×18 mm (4.25×1.81×0.71 in)
- Weight: 110 g (4 oz)
- Operating system: Series 40 3rd Edition, Feature Pack 1 UI
- CPU: ARM9, 289 MHz
- Memory: 6 MB (internal)
- Removable storage: Supported up to 2 GB
- Battery: BP-6M, 800-1100 mAh Lithium-ion polymer
- Rear camera: 2-megapixel, 1600x1200 max resolution, night mode, 640x480 video resolution
- Display: Vertical 2 inches, 31 x 41 mm QVGA 262k color TFT LCD, 240x320 (320x240 in Landscape Mode)
- Other: Stereo FM radio, Stereo Dual Speakers

The Nokia 6233 phone made by Nokia is the successor to the Nokia 6230i. It is a 3G/GSM/WCDMA mobile phone that runs the Series 40 3rd Edition, Feature Pack 1 UI on the Nokia operating system.

The Latvian operator LMT offered a "LMT 15" branded version for its anniversary in 2007, with the logo located just below the screen.

== Features ==
The phone has two stereo speakers with surround sound. It supports a variety of music formats including AAC, MP3 and WMA files. The latest firmware is version 5.60. It has a camera which can take photos at a resolution of 2 megapixels (1200 x 1600), and videos at VGA (640 x 480) resolution, as well as MP3 playback, Bluetooth, infrared, radio, games and Internet access.

== Nokia 6233 Music Edition ==
Dubbed "Music Edition", a special white colour version of the Nokia 6233 was sold in Asian Pacific regions. It supports A2DP Bluetooth profile, meaning it is compatible with stereo Bluetooth headsets, providing better audio fidelity. This edition was sold with a larger MicroSD card (512MB instead of 64MB) and a speaker dock with a USB connection to a PC.

== Nokia 6234 ==
The Nokia 6234 is similar to the Nokia 6233, but was made available exclusively to Vodafone subscribers. It can however be unlocked for use with other networks. It differs from the 6233 having a stainless steel front cover, Vodafone logos and Vodafone branded software.

== Specifications sheet ==
| Feature | Specification |
|---|---|
| Battery | Nokia Battery BP-6M-S |
| Talk time | GSM: Up to 4 hours, WCDMA: Up to 3.1 hours |
| Standby time | 340 hours (2 weeks) |
| Weight | 110 g |
| Dimensions | 108 x 46 x 18 mm |
| Screen size | Diagonal 2 inches (51 mm), 31 x 41 mm |
| Screen resolution | QVGA 262,144 color TFT LCD, 240x320 pixel resolution |
| Availability | Current |
| Form factor | Candybar |
| Operating System | Series 40, Third Edition |
| GSM frequencies | GSM 900/1800/1900 MHz, WCDMA 2100 MHz |
| GPRS | Yes, class 10 32-48 kbit/s |
| EDGE (EGPRS) | Yes, class 10 236.8 kbit/s |
| 3G | Yes 384 kbit/s. |
| WCDMA | yes |
| WLAN | No |
| Camera | 2-megapixel resolution, 8x digital zoom |
| Video recording | Yes, VGA 640*480 @15fps |
| Multimedia Messaging | SMS, MMS+SMIL, IM and E-mail |
| Video calls | Yes |
| Push to talk | Yes, (Push to Talk over Cellular - PoC) |
| Java support | Yes, MIDP 2.0 |
| Built-in internal memory | 6 MB |
| Memory card slot | MicroSD up to 2 GB |
| Bluetooth | Yes v2.0 with Enhanced Data Rate |
| Infrared | Yes, Class 1 |
| Data cable support | Yes |
| Browser | WAP 2.0 XHTML |
| Email | Yes |
| Music player | Yes, stereo |
| Radio | Yes, stereo |
| Video Player | Yes, plays 3GP and MP4(No Streaming) |
| Stereo Speakers | Yes, two speakers |
| Polyphonic tones | Yes, 64-tones polyphony, MP3/AAC files be used as call melody |
| Vibrate | Yes |
| HF speakerphone | Yes |
| Offline mode | Yes |
| Synchronization | Nokia PC Suite and SyncML |

== Reception ==
Know Your Mobile gave the phone a positive review, saying it was "A terrific 3G phone that should appeal to business phone users".
