= Nokia 6300 =

Cell phone model

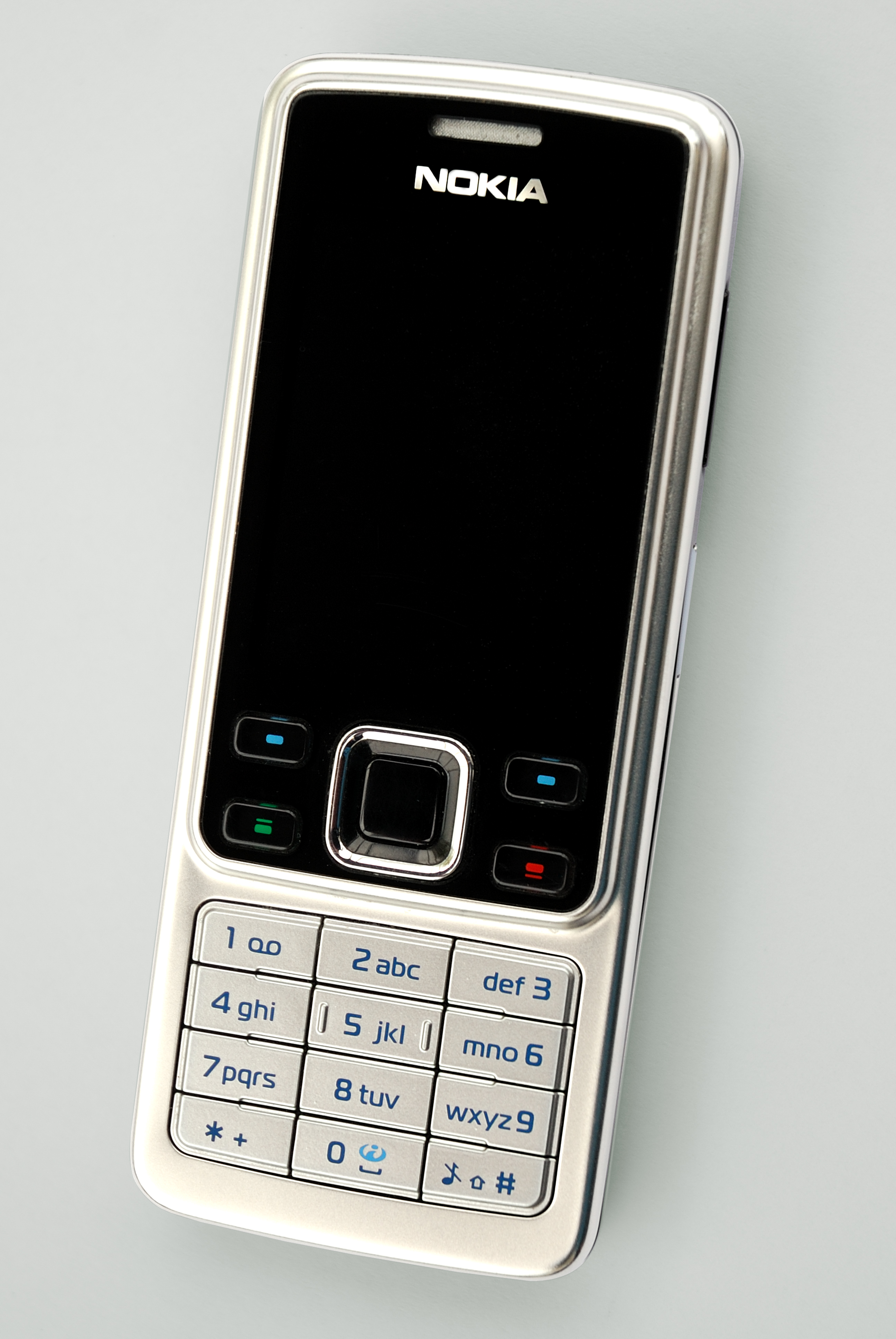
- Manufacturer: Nokia
- Type: Feature phone
- First released: January 2007; 19 years ago
- Discontinued: Q4 2010 / Q1 2011
- Predecessor: Nokia 6100
- Successor: Nokia 6303 classic Nokia 6700 classic
- Related: Nokia 3110 classic
- Compatible networks: GSM 900/1800/1900; GPRS; EDGE
- Form factor: Bar
- Dimensions: 106.4 mm (4.19 in) H 43.6 mm (1.72 in) W 11.7 mm (0.46 in) D
- Weight: 91 g (3.2 oz)
- Operating system: Series 40 3rd Edition Feature Pack 2
- CPU: 235 MHz, ARM9
- Memory: 16 MB
- Storage: 32 MB
- Removable storage: microSD, up to 2 GB
- SIM: miniSIM
- Battery: Nokia BL-4C, 860 mAh, 3.7 V user replaceable Li-ion
- Charging: Nokia 2-mm DC Charging Interface
- Rear camera: 2 MP (1600×1200 max.); QCIF video recording (176×144 px. MPEG4 at 15 fps max.)
- Display: 2 in (51 mm) diagonal TFT LCD; 240 × 320 px QVGA; 1:1.3̅ aspect-ratio full-screen 16.7M colors
- Sound: Mono speaker, 2.5mm stereo audio jack
- Connectivity: Bluetooth 2.0 + EDR with A2DP, HFP, HSP, OPP and DUN; Mini USB 2.0
- Data inputs: Keypad; Push buttons
- Hearing aid compatibility: M2
- Made in: Hungary
- Other: USB tethering

The Nokia 6300 is a mobile telephone handset produced by Nokia. It was announced on 28 November 2006 and released in January 2007. This model was assembled in several factories, including Jucu plant, near Cluj, in Romania. The Nokia 6300 is a mid-range phone combining a classic candybar design with a durable stainless steel and slim (11.7 mm thick) body. It runs on Series 40.

The 6300 was considered the successor of many models, including 6230i and 6310i. The 6300 electronics are based on the Nokia 3110 classic and related to various other Nokia phones including the Nokia 5310, and Nokia 3500 classic.

A derivative of the 6300, the 6300b, supported the 850 MHz GSM band instead of 900 MHz, and was marketed in the United States.

The 6300 was a hit and became one of the top-selling Nokia models on the market during its time, and one of the most notable phones created by Nokia.

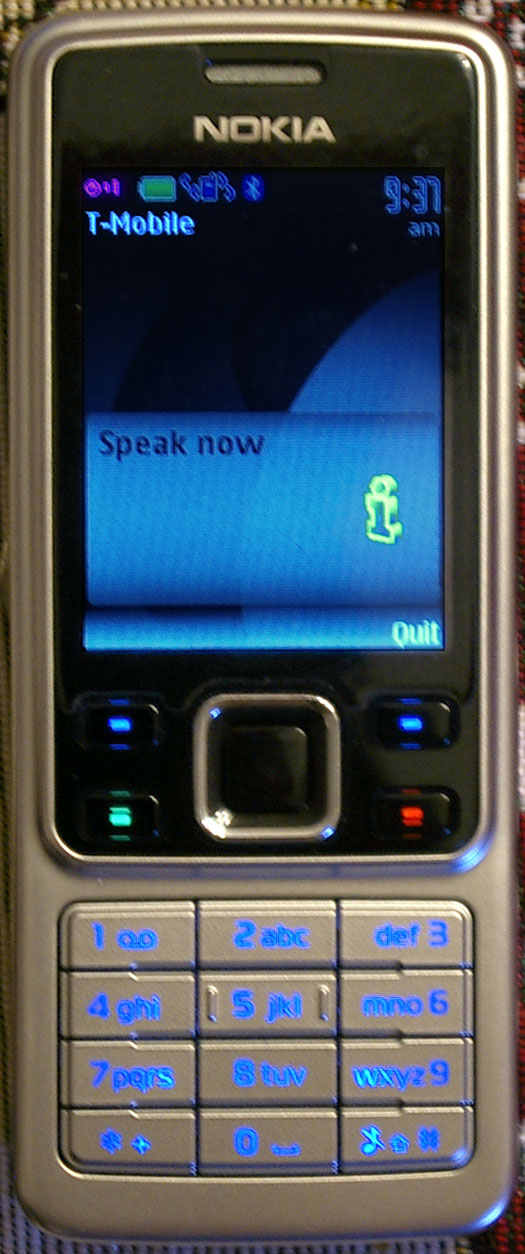
Nokia 6301b ready to accept a voice command. Note the pink signal strength indicator showing it is connected to a router rather than a GSM tower.

Further derivatives, the 6301 and 6300i released in 2008, added WiFi (802.11b/g) and UMA capabilities, increased storage and memory (64 MB and 32 MB instead of 32 MB and 16 MB, respectively), microSDHC support, and a later revision of Series 40. They were announced on 20 September 2007 and 26 March 2008 respectively. (Note: Article states 26 March 2007 instead of 26 March 2008) The 6301b was sold in North America and switched the 900 MHz GSM band for 850 MHz. The 6300i is differentiated from the 6301 in permitting use of WiFi for applications other than Wi-Fi calling, such as web browsing.

The model number was reused in 2020 for a KaiOS-powered mobile phone announced by HMD Global, the Nokia 6300 4G.

== Popularity and reception ==
Nokia 6300 was a highly popular mobile phone handset throughout the world, officially the best-selling Nokia handset in 2007. A report from The Economist said that Nokia 6300 was the most popular handset in Africa as of the beginning of 2011, four years after the original release.

Reviewers of the handset generally praised the build quality and feature set. Reviewer S21 called it "our favourite Nokia phone for a long time", praising the user-friendliness and metallic design.

The 6300 was succeeded by the Nokia 6303 classic and Nokia 6700 classic.
