= Nokia 6700 slide =

2010 Nokia slide phone

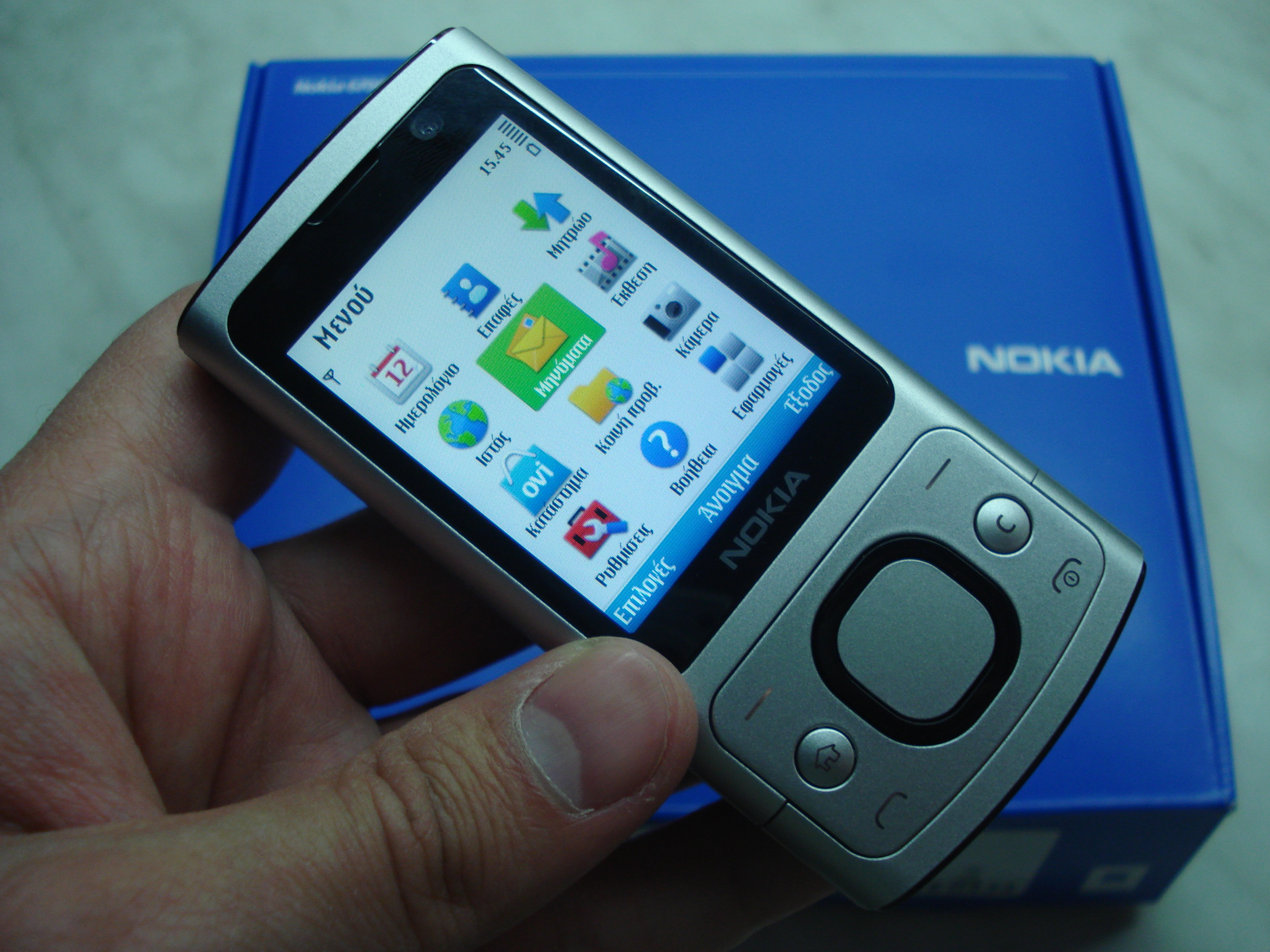
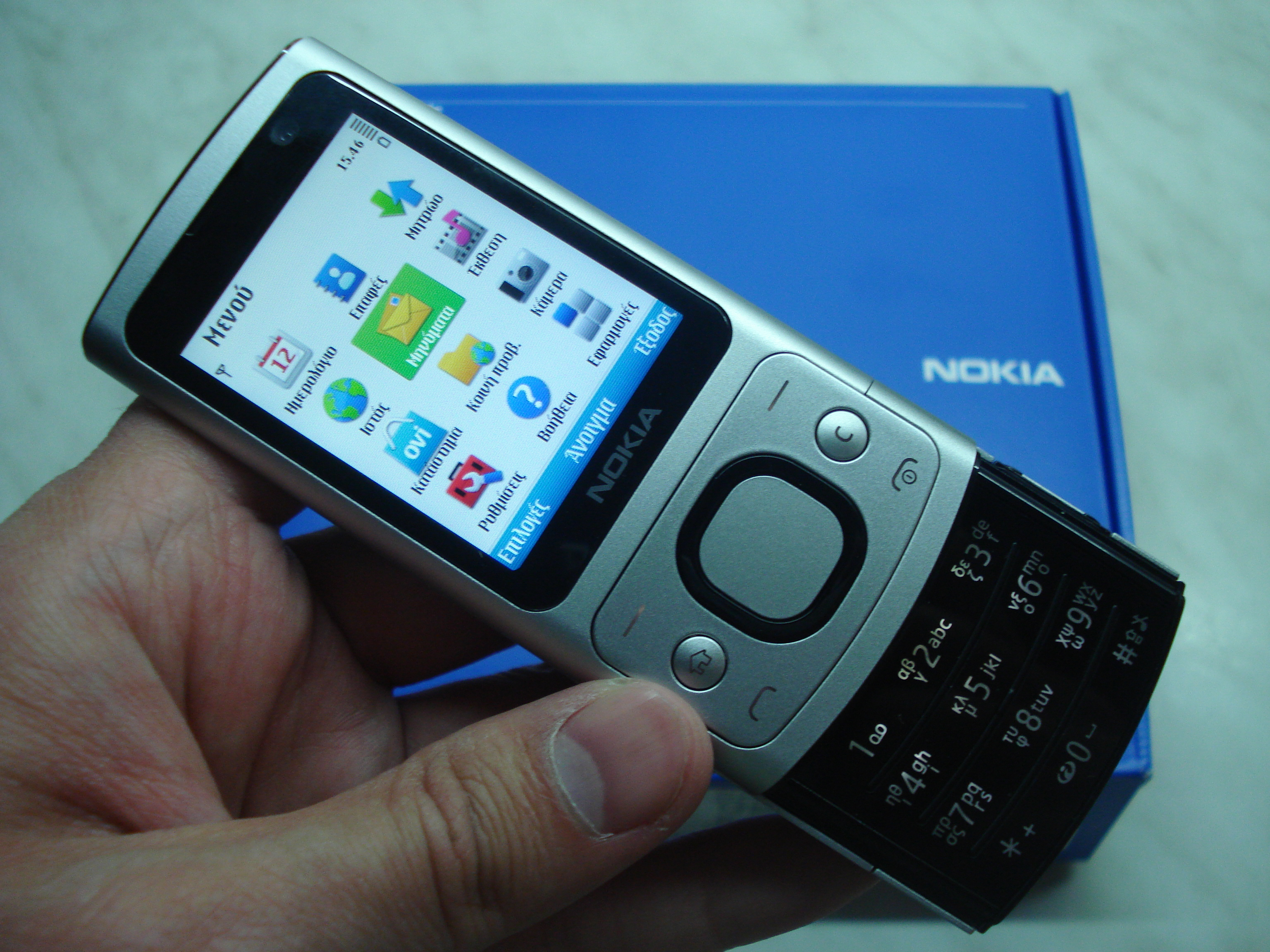
- Manufacturer: Nokia
- First released: November 2009
- Availability by region: April 2010
- Predecessor: Nokia 6500 slide
- Related: Nokia C5-00
- Compatible networks: (3.5G), UMTS, Quad band GSM / GPRS / EDGE GSM 850, GSM 900, GSM 1800, GSM 1900
- Form factor: Slider
- Dimensions: 46.0×95.2×15.9 mm (1.81×3.75×0.63 in)
- Weight: 110 g (4 oz) (0.24 lb)
- Operating system: Symbian OS 9.3 with Nokia S60 3rd Edition Feature Pack 2.
- CPU: ARM 1136JF-S clocked at 600 Mhz
- Memory: 128 MB SDRAM, 256 MB ROM, 50 MB Internal User Storage
- Removable storage: max. 16 GB microSDHC
- Battery: BL-4CT (860 mAh), AC-8U (2.0 mm power connector)
- Rear camera: 5.0 Megapixels, Carl Zeiss optics with autofocus and dual LED flash
- Front camera: 0.3 Megapixels, Front camera for video calls
- Display: 320×240 color transmissive TFT, 1.6 million colors

The Nokia 6700 Slide is a midrange slide mobile phone released by Nokia in April 2010. It was produced in a variety of different colors and had a metal case.

== Features ==
The 6700 Slide shared many of the features associated with smartphones of the time, including email web browsing, and 3G connectivity. It came with the Symbian S60 operating system that provided access to downloadable applications in the Ovi app store. The phone featured a keyboard which was accessed by slide, a 5 megapixel rear camera with flash, and it had a display resolution of 320 x 240. The phone also came with a 2.5mm headphone jack.

The 6700 Slide did not support Wi-Fi connectivity or GPS, and it did not come with a built in document viewer.
