= Nokia 6700 classic =

Mobile phone model

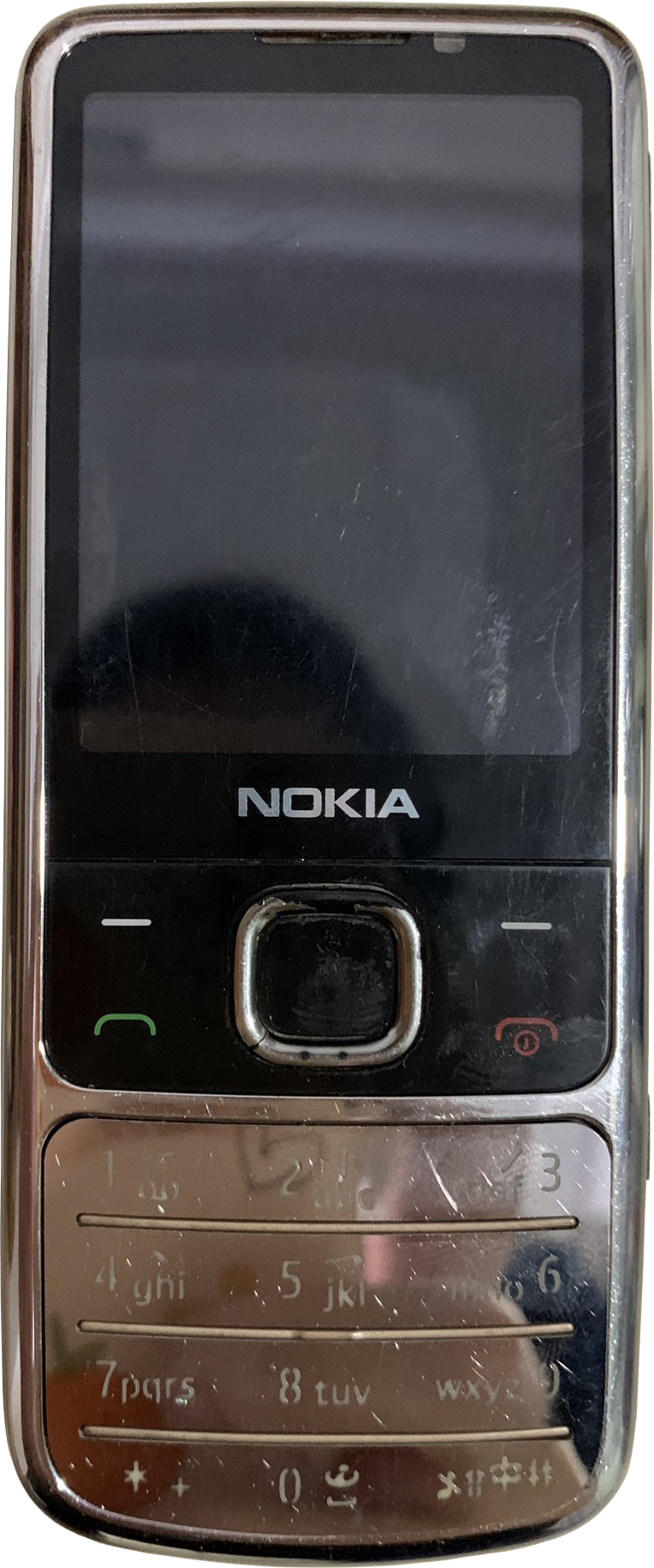
- Manufacturer: Nokia
- Type: Feature phone
- First released: April 30, 2009; 17 years ago
- Discontinued: Q3 2012
- Predecessor: Nokia 6300; Nokia 6500 classic
- Successor: Nokia 515
- Compatible networks: GSM 850/900/1800/1900; UMTS 900/1900/2100; HSDPA 10.2 Mbps; HSUPA 2 Mbps; GPRS; EDGE
- Form factor: Bar
- Colors: Silver; Black; Bronze; Chrome; Illuvial
- Dimensions: 109.8 mm (4.32 in) H 45 mm (1.8 in) W 11.2 mm (0.44 in) D
- Weight: 113 g (4.0 oz)
- Operating system: Series 40 6th Edition
- CPU: 600 MHz Samsung K5W4G2GACA – AL54, ARM11
- Memory: 64 MB
- Storage: 170 MB
- Removable storage: microSDHC, up to 16 GB
- SIM: miniSIM
- Battery: Nokia BL-6Q, 970 mAh, 3.7 V user replaceable Li-ion
- Charging: Micro USB 2.0, Nokia 2-mm DC Charging Interface
- Rear camera: 5 MP (2592×1944px max.); LED flash Auto focus VGA video recording (640×480 px. MPEG4 at 15 fps max.)
- Display: 2.2 in (56 mm) diagonal TFT LCD; 240 × 320 px QVGA; 1:1.3̅ aspect-ratio full-screen 16.7M colors
- Sound: Mono speaker, 3.5mm stereo audio jack
- Connectivity: Bluetooth 2.1 + EDR with A2DP, HFP, HSP, OPP and DUN; Micro USB 2.0
- Data inputs: Keypad; Push buttons A-GPS; Ambient light sensor Accelerometer
- Made in: Hungary
- Other: USB tethering

The Nokia 6700 classic is a mobile phone made by Nokia and successor of the 6300 and 6500 classic. It was announced on 29 January 2009, and arrived on the European market in June that year. It has a stainless steel body and a chrome-covered keypad.

The last units were produced by mid-2012, some of which were on the market over a year after the model's discontinuation.
