= Nokia 5300 =

Cell phone model

Nokia 5300 XpressMusic
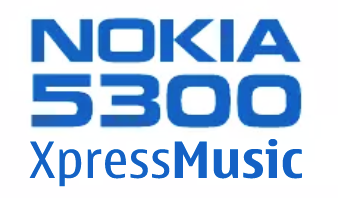

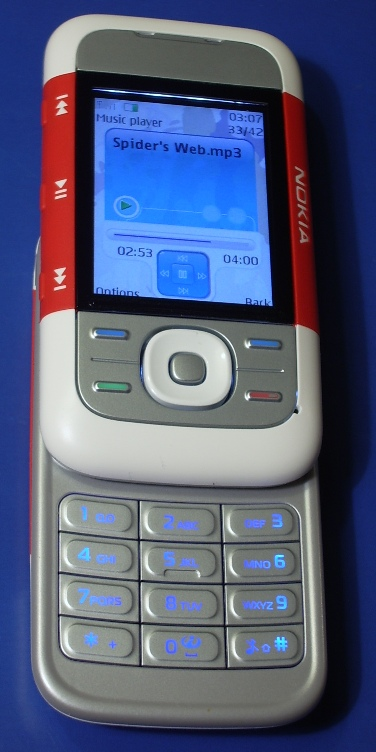
- Manufacturer: Nokia
- Availability by region: September 26, 2006 (worldwide)
- Predecessor: Nokia 3220
- Successor: Nokia 5310; Nokia 5610 XpressMusic
- Related: XpressMusic; Nokia 5200
- Compatible networks: GSM/EGSM 900/1800/1900 MHz, and GSM/EGSM 850/1800/1900 MHz
- Form factor: Slide-up phone
- Dimensions: 92.4×48.2×20.7 mm (3.64×1.90×0.81 in), 85 cc (volume)
- Weight: 106.5 g (4 oz)
- Operating system: Series 40 3rd edition (proprietary)
- CPU: ARM9 Vertex
- Memory: 32 MB internal memory (flash), 16 MB system RAM
- Removable storage: microSD (up to 2 GB)
- Battery: Nokia battery BL-5B (820 mAh)
- Rear camera: 1.3 megapixels CMOS camera in 8× digital zoom
- Display: QVGA (240×320 pixels) in 2-inch display, 262,144 (18-bit) true color TFT LCD
- Connectivity: GPRS, HSCSD, EDGE/CSD, IrDA, Mini USB 2.0, PC Suite, Bluetooth (A2DP supports wireless audio transfer), Remote OTA synchronization with SyncML, 2.5 mm Nokia AV connector
- Data inputs: Keypad

Nokia 5300 XpressMusic is a slider mobile phone by Nokia, part of the XpressMusic range. It was announced on 26 September 2006 alongside Nokia 5200 and released at the end of that year. It runs on Nokia Series 40 3rd Edition FP2.

== Overview ==
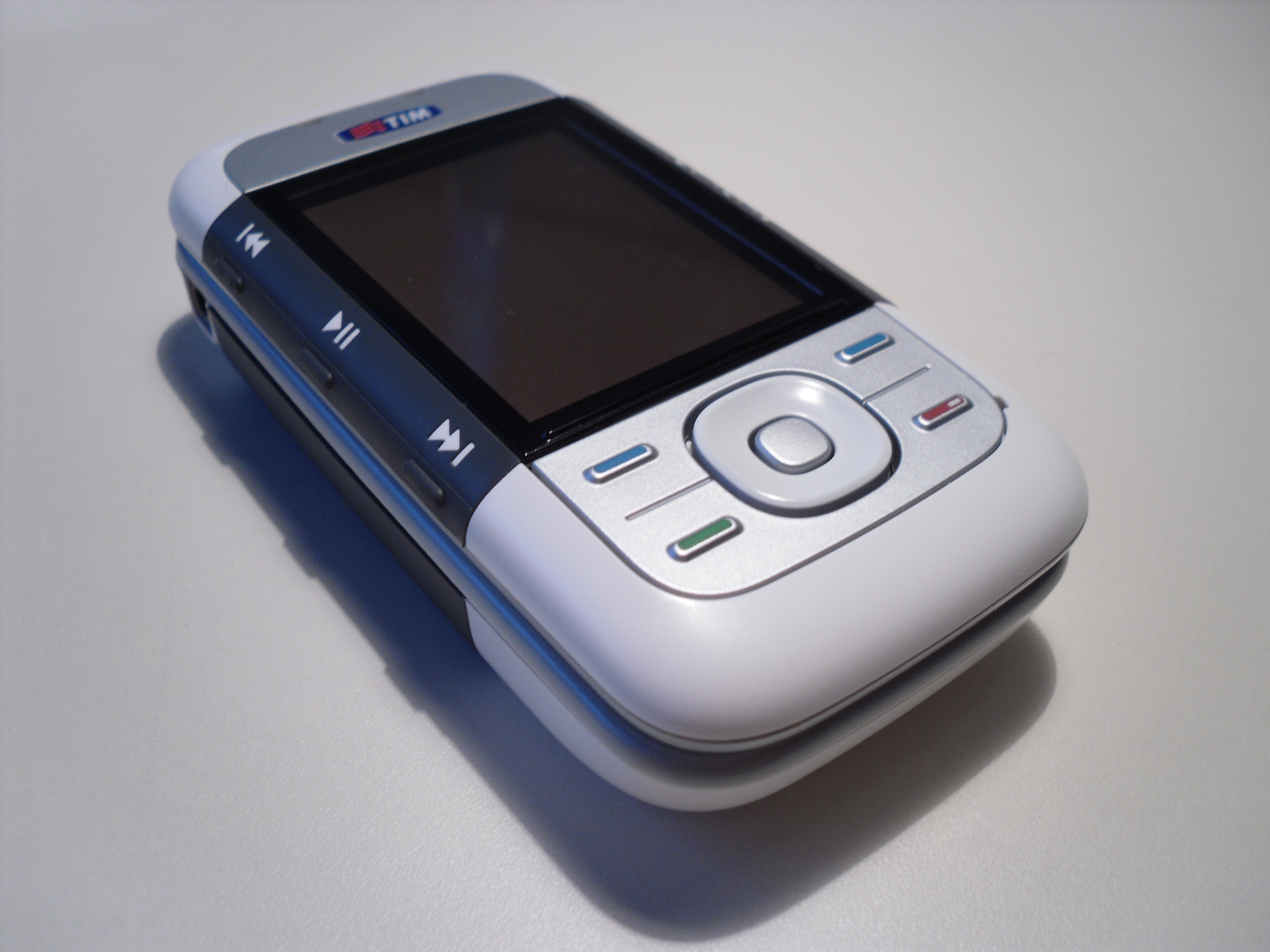
The phone when it is closed

The phone has a sleek slider design and features a 240×320 pixels (QVGA) TFT display and a 1.3-megapixel (CMOS) camera which can be used in landscape. It has dedicated music buttons on each side which makes it easy to access tracks in music player mode or tune in different stations in radio mode, with a 2.5 mm. headset jack. It has also a powerful loudspeaker at the back for high quality sound output. It also features a removable microSD card with a maximum capacity of 2 GB and powered by an ARM9 CPU running at 237 MHz. Nokia 5300 XpressMusic was launched on T-Mobile's USA network on 1 March 2007.

Nokia 5300 can browse and surf the internet via GPRS. The phone can access different web or mobile sites like Friendster, Yahoo! Mail, Yahoo! Messenger, Google, YouTube, Multiply etc. The phone also features the active standby mode which can create shortcuts while on standby mode. It has a dedicated keys on sides let you access to music or just push camera button to start camera or video mode. The best view when you play your video is on panoramic view.

These are the menu options of Nokia 5300: Contacts, Log, Organizer, Gallery, Messaging, Media, Applications, Web, Settings, PTT and the user's SIM network services.

== Features ==
=== Frequency and power ===
Operating frequency

- EGSM 900/1800/1900 MHz and EGSM 850/1800/1900 MHz

Power management

- Nokia Battery BL-5B (820mah)
- Talk Time up to 3.2 hours
- Standby Time up to 223 hours
- Music time up to 12 hours

(operation times depending on network and usage)

=== External features ===
Dimensions

- Volume: 85cc.
- Weight: 106.5 g.
- Length: 92.4 mm.
- Width: 48.2 mm.
- Thickness (max.): 20.7 mm.

Display

- 262,144 (262K) color true color TFT QVGA 320 × 240 pixels, 2' LCD

User interface

- S40 user interface
- Dedicated music keys for play, pause, forward and rewind functions
- Side volume keys can be used as zoom keys when camera is activated

=== Internal features ===
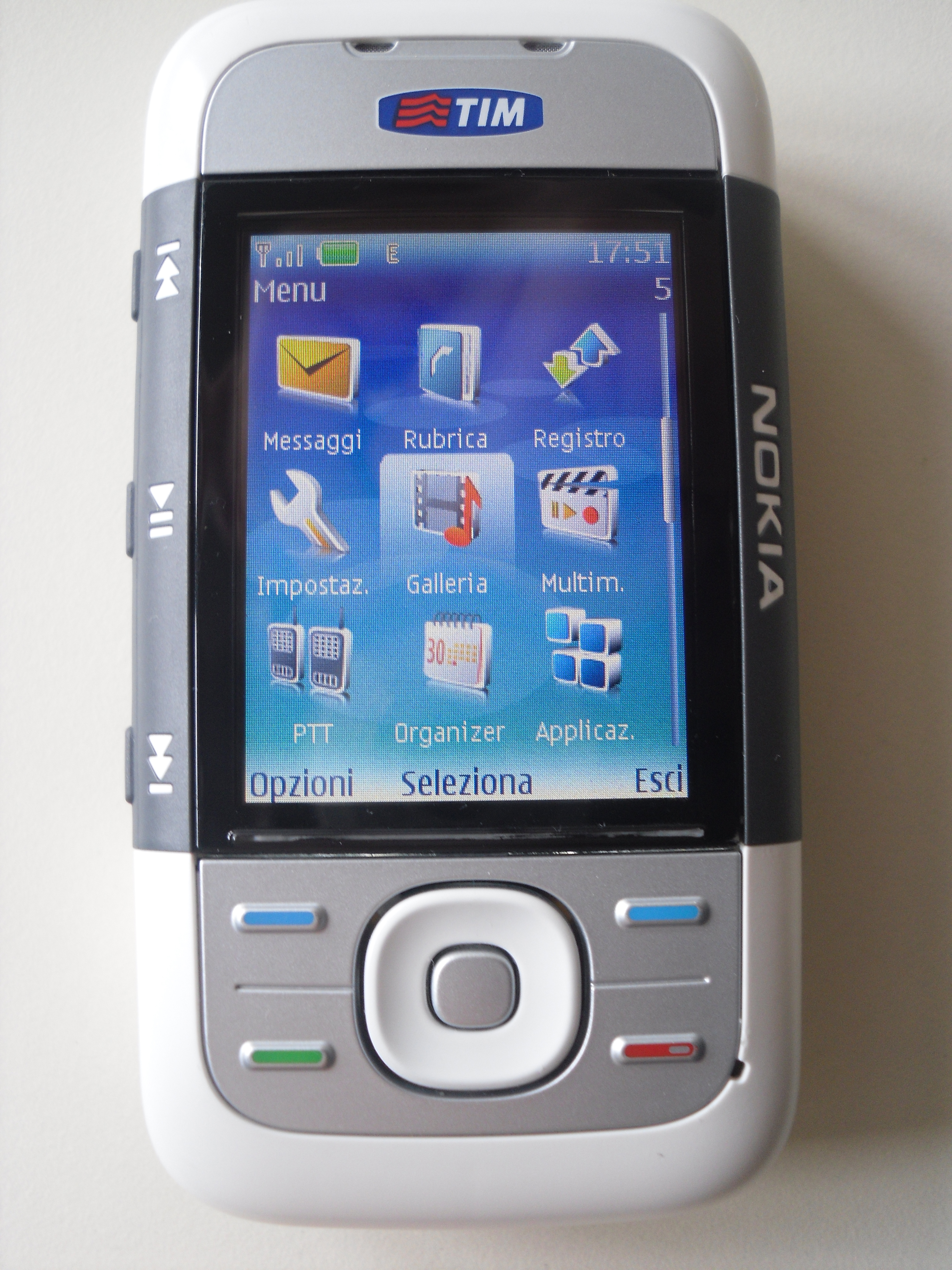
Main menu

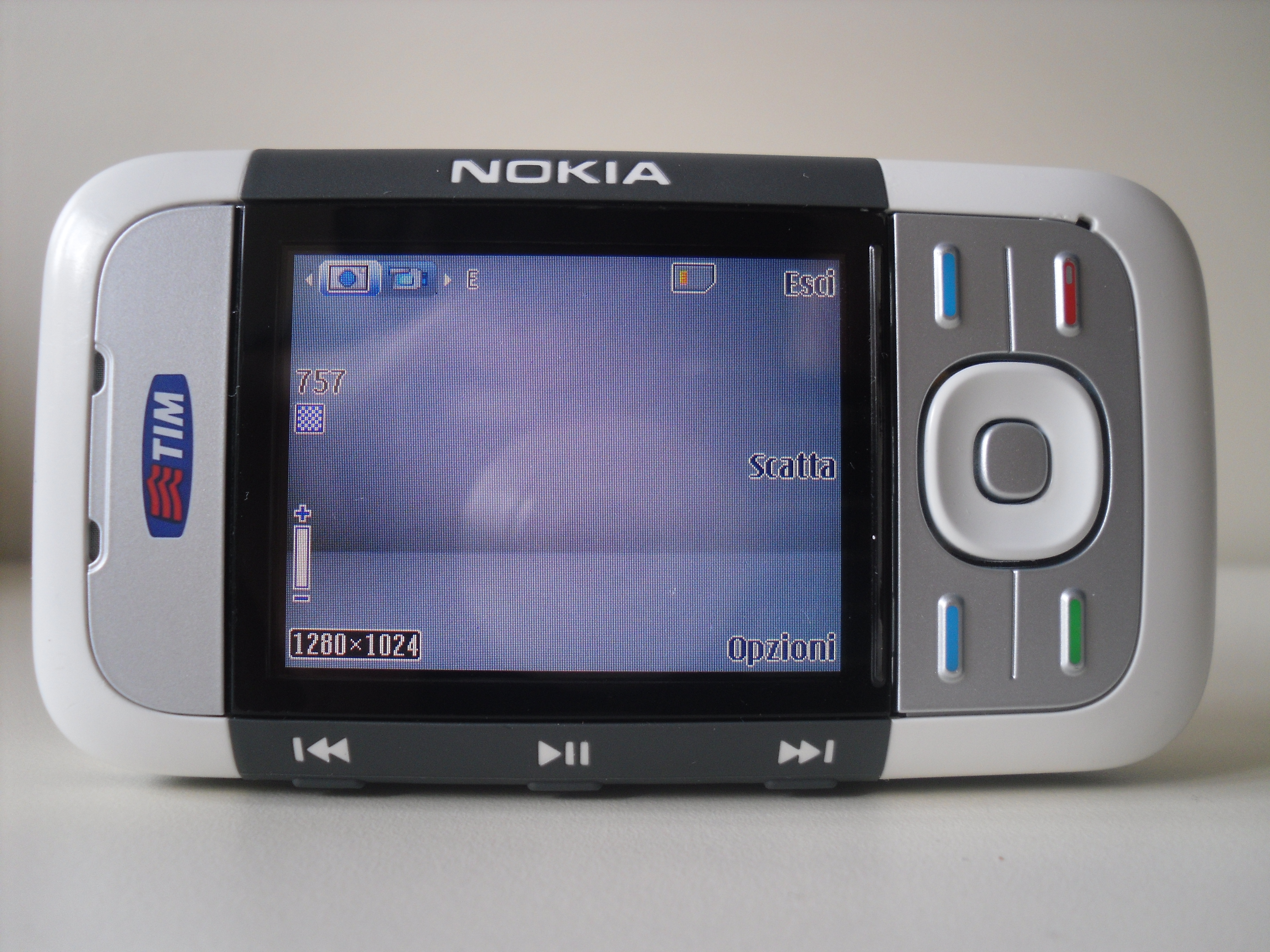
Taking photos

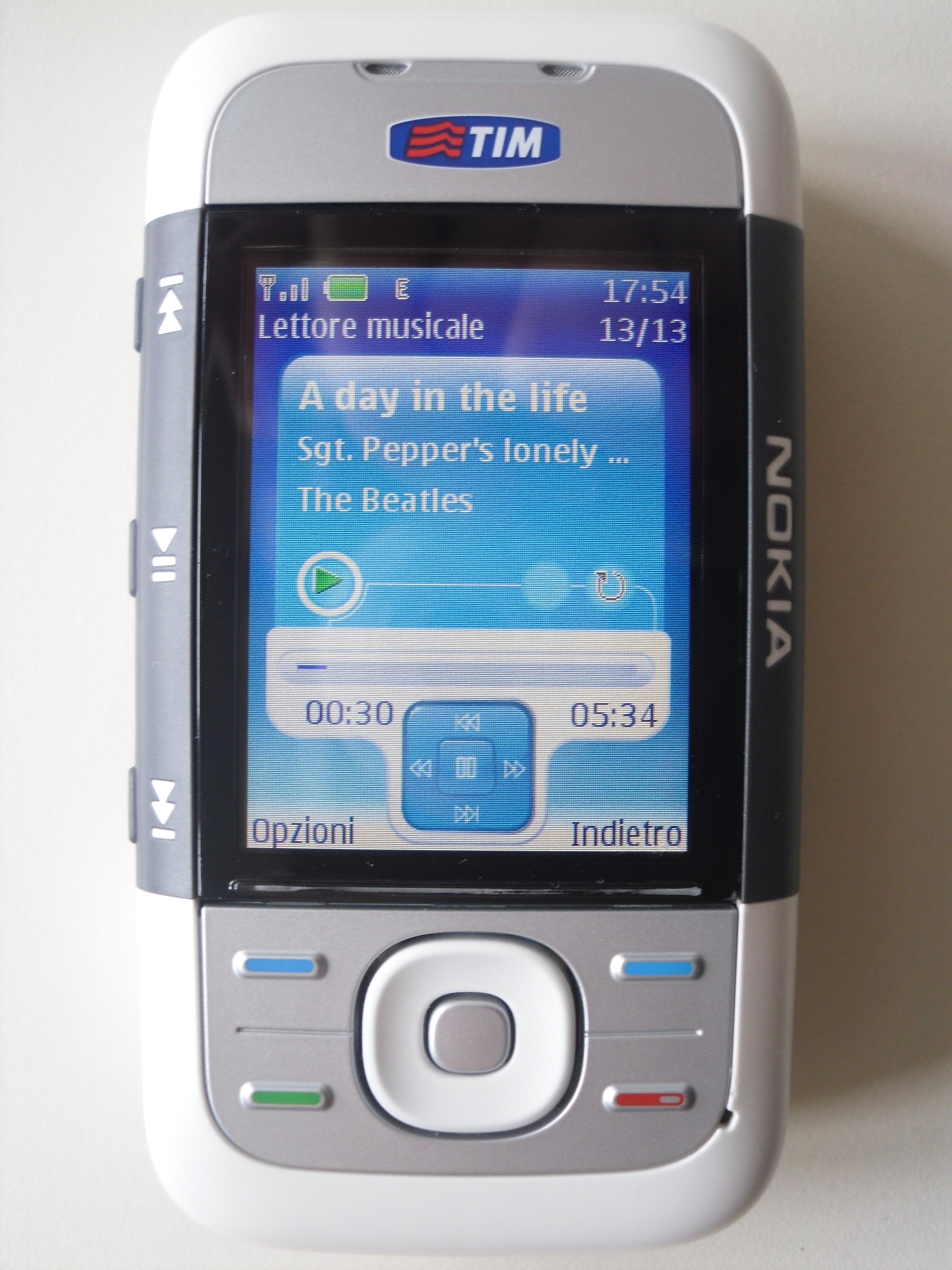
Playing music

Imaging features

- Integrated 1.3-megapixel camera with up to 8x digital zoom
- Dedicated camera button
- Landscape camcorder and video player
- Video recording and playback
- Download and upload images and video sequences
- Fun frames and programmable white balance for camera

Multimedia features

- Visual radio, listen to music and interact to favorite radio stations
- Playback video formats
- Integrated FM radio
- New S40 music player
- Integrated music player for MP3/AAC/eAAC+/AAC+/WMA/AMR/Midi formats
- Listen, create playlists and manage music
- Different skins for the music player

Memory functions

- Combo memory with 32 MB flash and 16 MB RAM
- Hot swappable slot for microSD memory card
- Options to expand with microSD card

Messaging features

- Multimedia messaging: MMS for creating, receiving, editing and sending videos and pictures with AMR voice clips
- Email: Supports SMTP, POP3, IMAP4 and APOP protocols
- Attachments: Supports JPEG, GIF, 3GP, MP3, PowerPoint and Excel files
- Text messaging: Supports SMS, picture message, SMS distribution list
- Audio messaging: Records own voice message and send to compatible devices
- Instant Messaging and Presence-enhanced contacts

Applications

- Java MIDP 2.0
- Pre-installed Java applications
- Over-the-air (OTA) download of Java-based applications and games
- 3 pre-installed games

Pre-installed games

- Music Guess
- Pro Snowboard
- Snake III

Ringing tones

- 64-chord/voice polyphonic MIDI ringing tones
- Supported file formats include MP3, True Tones, AAC, 64-chord/voice polyphonic MIDI tones
- Video ring-tones
- Alert and gaming tones

Connectivity

- A2DP to support Bluetooth stereo headset for high quality, wireless audio transfer
- Infrared (IR)
- Remote OTA synchronization with SyncML
- Mini USB interface with USB 2.0
- Local/remote synchronization with PC using PC Suite
- New 2.5 mm. Nokia AV connector
- Push to talk over cellular network (network dependent)

Browsing and data transfer

- xHTML over TCP/IP
- Full OMA Digital Rights Management 2.0 for content protection
- Data transfer: GPRS and EGPRS multislots class 10
- HSCSD/CSD for data modem

Personal information management (PIM)

- Advance series 40 PIM features including calendar, contacts, and to-do list
- Alarm clock
- Reminders
- Calculator
- New and enhanced calendar view

Other features

- Internal antenna
- Animated color screensaver
- Changeable color themes, user-defined themes
- Nokia Sensor
- Flash lite player 2.0
- Plug and Play mobile devices
- Nokia Audio Manager and Windows Media Player
- Nokia Catalogs
- Nokia Widsets, Google Map and Yahoo! Go (free downloads)
- Covers: Available colors in Grey-White, Lilac-White, Black-White, All Black cover and the famous Red-White

=== Sales package contents ===
- Nokia 5300 XpressMusic phone
- Nokia Battery BL-5B
- Nokia Standard Charger AC-3
- Nokia Stereo Headset HS-47
- Nokia MicroSD Card
- Mini USB cable
- Universal headphone adapter
- CD-ROM for PC Suite
- User Guide manual

== Differences of 5300 and 5200 ==
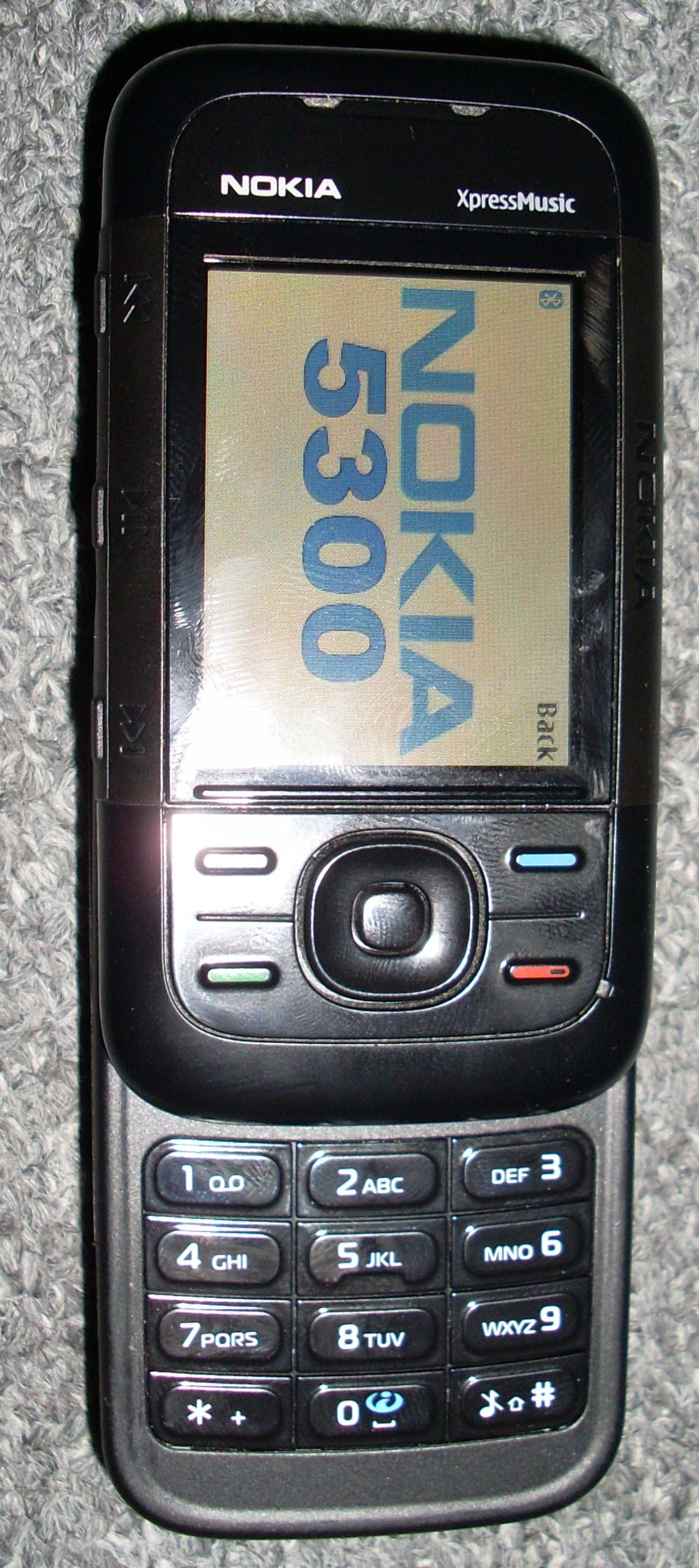
The Nokia 5300 in black

The Nokia 5300 is generally comparable with the Nokia 5200.

	5200	5300
Screen size / type	128 × 160 pixels / TFT (STN)	240 × 320 pixels / TFT
Display	1.8 inch.	2 inch.
Internal memory	5 MB	8 MB
External memory	Up to 2 GB	Up to 2 GB
Camera	VGA	1.3-megapixel (8x digital zoom)
Weight	104 g.	106.5 g.
Battery life	Talk: 3.2 hours Standby: 263 hours	Talk: 3.2 hours Standby: 233 hours

Talk: 3.2 hours
Standby: 233 hours

== In media ==
The phone is shown in the Fall Out Boy "This Ain't a Scene, It's an Arms Race", "Thnks fr th Mmrs" and The Academy Is... "We've Got a Big Mess on Our Hands" music video.

== Related handsets ==
- Nokia 5200 (Slide)
- Nokia 5610 (Slide)
- Nokia 5310 (Slim)
- Nokia 5320 (3G Phone)
- Nokia 5800 (Touchscreen)
- Nokia 5220 (Asymmetric)
- Nokia 5130 (Candybar)
- Nokia 5700 (Twist)
