= Nokia 5310 =

Cell phone model

Nokia 5310 XpressMusic
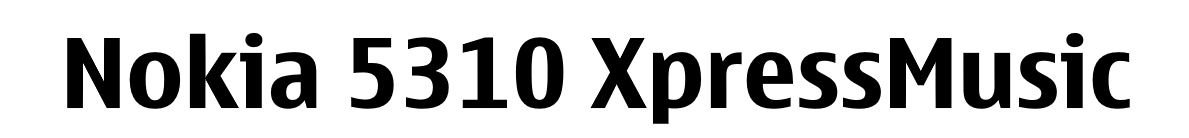

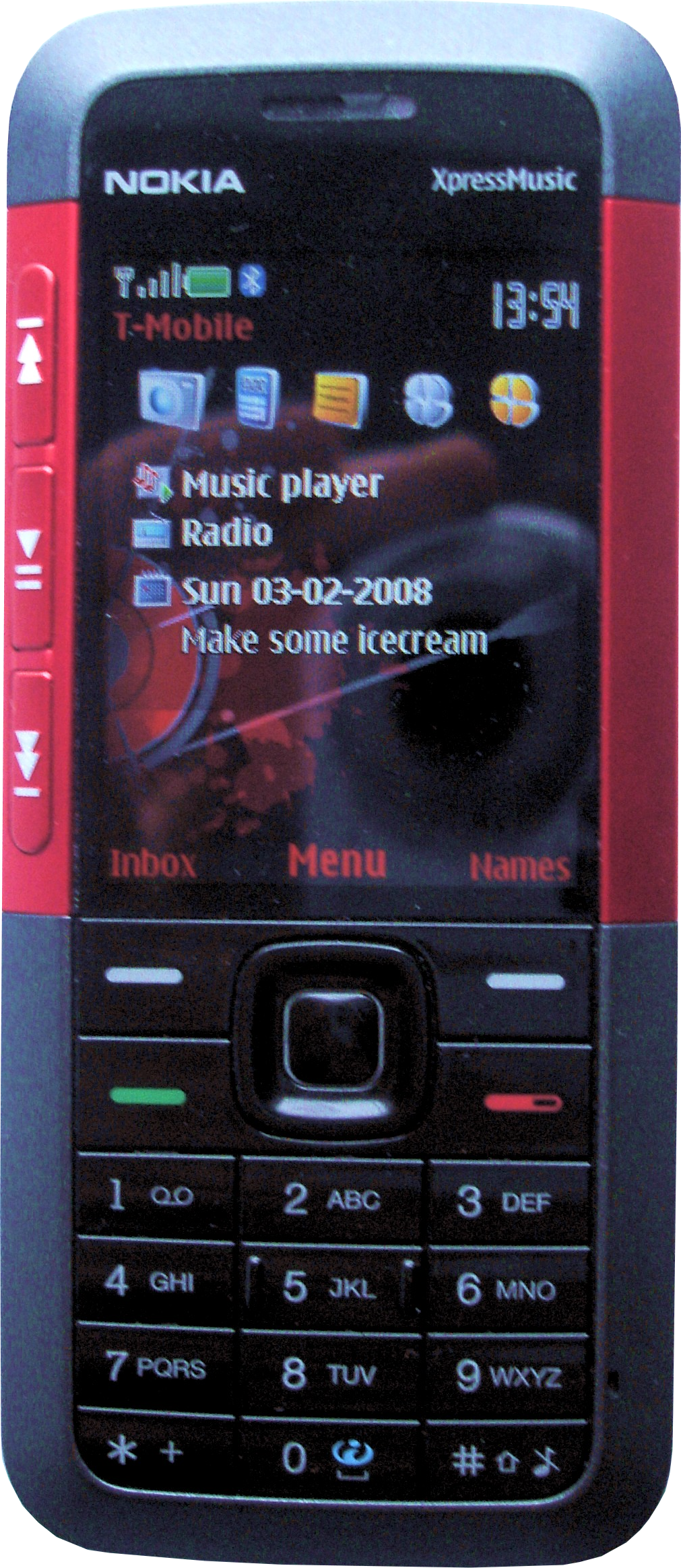
- Manufacturer: Nokia
- Availability by region: September 2007
- Predecessor: Nokia 5200; Nokia 5300
- Successor: Nokia 5320 XpressMusic; Nokia 5130 XpressMusic; Nokia 5310 (2020) (revival); Nokia 5310 (2024) (revival)
- Related: Nokia 5000; Nokia 5610 XpressMusic; Nokia 6300; Nokia 6500 classic
- Compatible networks: GSM 850 / GSM 900 / GSM 1800 / GSM 1900
- Form factor: Candybar
- Dimensions: 103.8×44.7×9.9 mm (4.09×1.76×0.39 in)
- Weight: 71 g (3 oz)
- Operating system: Nokia Series 40 5th Edition, Feature Pack 1
- CPU: ARM9 @ 230 MHz (for apps)
- Memory: 30 MB internal memory, 32 MB system RAM (2 MB of heap memory for apps)
- Removable storage: microSDHC up to 32 GB
- SIM: miniSIM
- Battery: Li-Ion 840 mAh (BL-4CT)
- Rear camera: 2 megapixels
- Display: 240 x 320 pixels, 2.1-inch, TFT LCD, (16 million colours)
- Connectivity: Bluetooth Class 2 version 2.0 with A2DP, 2.0 micro-USB
- Data inputs: Keypad

The Nokia 5310 is a mobile phone, introduced by Nokia on 29 August 2007 as part of the music-focused XpressMusic label and released in October 2007. It is less than a centimeter thick and is available with a blue, red, purple, pink, orange, silver or black trim, the main body also being available in grey, black or white. It features many music specific features as well as a 2.0-megapixel camera. At 9.9 mm thick, it is one of few mobile phones measuring less than 1 cm thick at the time. It is one of the lightest phones Nokia has ever produced at 71 g.

On 19 March 2020, HMD Global released a reimagining of the phone, the Nokia 5310 (2020), and on 16 April 2024, the updated Nokia 5310 (2024) was released.

== Features ==
The phone has basic organizer functions including a calendar, to-do list, and notes. All of these plus the phonebook can be synchronized with a desktop calendar such as iCal over Bluetooth. As a music-oriented phone, it comes with a dedicated audio chip, which delivers better audio quality, as well as 3 music buttons: Play/Pause, Next Track and Previous Track. These buttons can activate the music player on the phone during almost all other activities, such as sending text messages and changing settings. With the included headset it can play FM radio and receive calls with the headset's button. The 5310 also has WAP 2.0/xHTML, as well as HTML capabilities.

== Specification sheet ==
Type	Specification
Modes	American version: GSM 850 / GSM 1800 / GSM 1900; European/Asian version: GSM 900 / GSM 1800 / GSM 1900
Weight	71 g
Dimensions	103.8 x 44.7 x 9.9 mm (4.2 x 1.72 x 0.46 in) 44.8 cc
Form Factor	Candybar
Battery Life	Talk: 5.20 hours Standby: 300 hrs (12.5 days)
Battery Type	Li-Ion 860 mAh (Nokia BL-4CT)
Display	Type: LCD (Color TFT/TFD) Colors: 16 million (24-bit) Size: 2.1 inches" (~190 ppi pixel density) Resolution: 240 x 320 pixels (QVGA)
Platform / OS	BB5 / Nokia Series 40, 3rd Edition, Feature Pack 2
Memory	microSD up to 8 GB with formatting card inside the phone and not connecting to a PC, up to 32 GB if formatted outside (for example, PC), hot-swappable, 30 MB built-in flash memory
Phone Book Capacity	2000, Photocall
FCC ID	PPIRM-222, PPIRM-217 for Asia/Europe version
SAR	1.25 W/kg (head)(US), 0.98 W/kg (EU) / 1.04 W/kg (body)
Digital TTY/TDD	Yes
Multiple Languages	Yes
Polyphonic Ringtones	Chords: 64
Ringer Profiles	Yes
Vibrate	Yes
Bluetooth	Yes, v2.0 with A2DP / Supported Profiles: HSP, HFP, A2DP, SAP version 2.0 + EDR
PC Sync	Yes
USB	Yes, v2.0 microUSB (does not charge phone)
Multiple Numbers per Name	Yes
Voice Dialing	Yes
Custom Graphics	Yes
Custom Ringtones	Yes
Data-Capable	Yes
Flight Mode	Yes
Packet Data	Technology: EDGE (EGPRS) class 32, up to 177 kbits / GPRS class 32
WAP / Web Browser	WAP 2.0/xHTML, HTML (Opera mini) / supports HTML, XHTML, TCP/IP
Predictive Text Entry	Technology: T9
Side Keys	volume keys on right, dedicated music keys on left
Memory Card Slot	Card Type: microSDHC / TransFlash, up to 32 GB. 1 GB card included (depending on service provider)
Email Client	Protocols Supported: IMAP4, POP3, SMTP supports attachments
MMS	MMS 1.2 / up to 300 KB per message / SMIL
Text Messaging	2-Way: Yes
FM Radio	Stereo: Yes
Music Player	Supported Formats: MP3, MP4, AAC, AAC+, eAAC+, WMA, WAV
Camera	Resolution: 2+ megapixel, 1600x1200 pixels
Streaming Video	Protocol: 3GPP
Video Capture	QCIF resolution, 15 frame/s, H.263 format, maximum 176x144 pixels
Alarm	Yes
Calculator	Yes
Calendar	Yes
SyncML	Yes
To-Do List	Yes
Voice Memo	Yes
Games	Yes
Java ME	Version: MIDP 2.0, CLDC 1.1 supported JSRs: 75, 82, 120, 135, 172, 177, 184, 185, 205, 226
Headset Jack (3.5 mm)	Yes (differs from standard, adapter necessary)
Push-To-Talk	Some versions only Type: PoC momo4u
Speaker Phone	Yes
Official Latest Firmware Version	09.42/10.10 (depending on product code)

== Related handsets ==
- Nokia 5130 XpressMusic
- Nokia 5220 XpressMusic
- Nokia 5610 XpressMusic
- Nokia 5630 XpressMusic
- Nokia 5300 XpressMusic
- Nokia 5800 XpressMusic
- Nokia 5310 (2020)
