= XpressMusic =

Brand name for Nokia phones

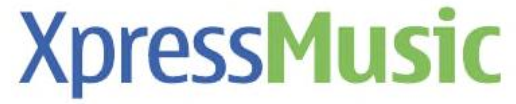

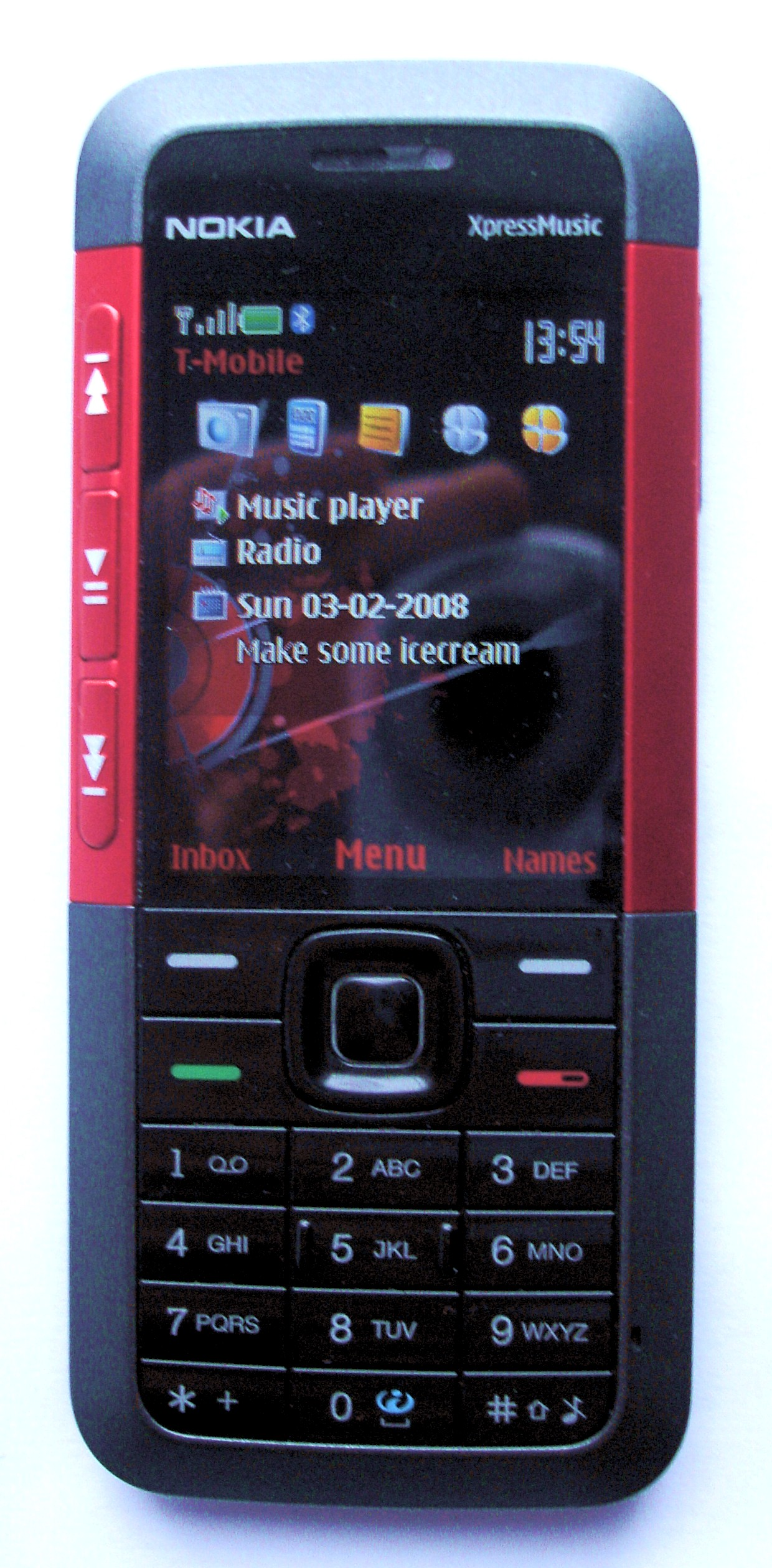
- Product type: Cellular phones
- Produced by: Nokia
- Country: Finland
- Introduced: 27 September 2006; 20 years ago
- Discontinued: 2010
- Related brands: List of Nokia products
- Markets: International
- Previous owners: Nokia

XpressMusic was a brand name for a line of Nokia mobile phones that were specially designed for music playback. All of the XpressMusic handsets came with expandable MicroSD memory slots and dedicated music keys, so these phones could also be used as MP3 players. The XpressMusic range was launched in September 2006 to compete with the Walkman brand series from Sony Ericsson. Except the Nokia 3250, all XpressMusic models were marketed with the 5000 series prefixes.

In September 2009, Nokia announced the Xseries line of phones. The Xseries replaced the XpressMusic brand.

On March 19, 2020, HMD Global announced Nokia 5310 as the revival version of Nokia 5310 XpressMusic, running Series 30+. Later, in 2022, they released "XpressAudio" branded feature phone Nokia 5710 with the main feature that have wireless Bluetooth earbuds inside the phone.

== History ==
=== 2006–2007 ===
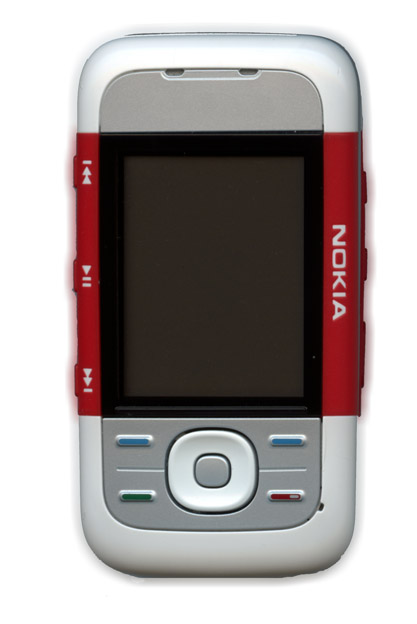
Nokia 5300

The original XpressMusic lineup was announced on 27 September 2006, consisting of an all glossy white shell and durable rubberised sides. First models included the rotating candybar Nokia 3250 XpressMusic (a revamped Nokia 3250) and the slider Nokia 5300 XpressMusic. Another slider similar to 5300 was also launched called Nokia 5200, but that model was not marketed as XpressMusic. These were first released before the end of the 2006.

A few months later for the 2007 year, the Nokia 5700 was added to the lineup, using a twisting function like the 3250. The ux design for music services was designed by Justin Small, previously design lead of UK start up Sendo Mobile Phones and later Motorola Mobile EMEUA. Small forecast that the Spotify model would bloom.

Model	Announced date	Platform	Form factor	Screen	Networks	Memory card (max size)
3250	27 September 2006 (XpressMusic variant)	S60 3rd Edition	Candybar (Keypad twists)	176 × 208 (18-bit)	GSM / (E)GPRS	MicroSD (2 GiB)
5300	27 September 2006	S40 3rd Ed., FP 2	Slider	240 × 320 (18-bit)	GSM / (E)GPRS	MicroSD (2 GiB)
5700	29 March 2007	S60 3rd Ed., FP 1	Candybar (Keypad twists)	240 × 320 (24-bit)	GSM / (E)GPRS / UMTS	MicroSD (2 GiB)

=== 2008 ===
The 2008 lineup saw the first 3G XpressMusic phones, first the 5610 and later the 5320, which included HSDPA. The lineup also added support for MicroSDHC, allowing cards larger than 2GB. The 5610 would be the only XpressMusic phone without a 3.5 mm headphone jack, instead having a 2.5 mm headphone jack.

Model	Announced date	Platform	Form factor	Screen	Networks	Memory card (max size)
5310	29 August 2007	S40 5th Ed., FP 1	Candybar	240 × 320 (24-bit)	GSM / (E)GPRS	MicroSDHC (2 GiB)
5610	29 August 2007	S40 5th Ed., FP 1	Slider	240 × 320 (24-bit)	GSM / (E)GPRS / UMTS	MicroSDHC (4 GiB)
5220	22 April 2008	S40 5th Ed., FP 1	Candybar	240 × 320 (18-bit)	GSM / (E)GPRS	MicroSDHC (8 GiB)
5320	22 April 2008	S60 3rd Ed., FP 2	Candybar	240 × 320 (24-bit)	GSM / (E)GPRS / UMTS / HSDPA	MicroSDHC (16 GiB)

=== 2009 ===
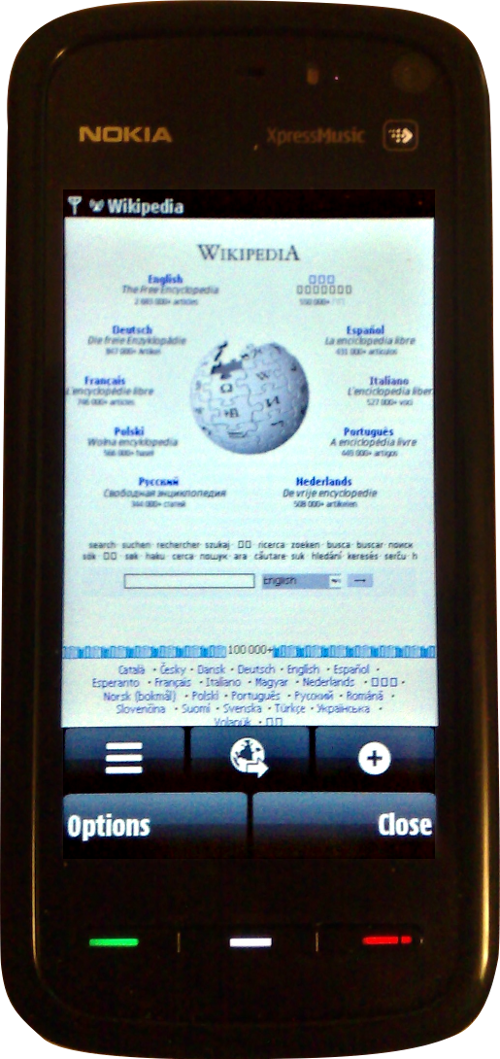
Nokia 5800

The 2009 lineup started with the 5800, one of two new phones (the other being the N97) to use the new touch-based S60 5th Edition, likely designed as a response to the increasing popularity of touchscreen handsets in the market. However, Nokia used the resistive instead of capacitive touchscreen reportedly to appeal to the global market. In this technology, touch is registered when two thin layers of the screen got pushed together under the finger. The 5800 (nicknamed the Tube) also featured a 3.2 megapixel camera with Carl Zeiss technology. Apart from the 5130 and lesser-known 5330, the rest of the lineup are 3G phones running Symbian S60 software, as the Nseries handsets of the time. Despite being a part of the XpressMusic series, the 5800 combined many standard smartphone capabilities too.

Model	Announced date	Platform	Form factor	Input	Screen	Networks	Memory card (max size)
5800	2 October 2008	S60 5th Edition	Slate	Touch	360 × 640 (24-bit)	GSM / (E)GPRS / UMTS / HSDPA / HSUPA / Wi-Fi / GPS / A-GPS	MicroSDHC (16 GiB)
5130	4 November 2008	S40 5th Ed., FP 1	Candybar	Keypad	240 × 320 (18-bit)	GSM / (E)GPRS	MicroSDHC (16 GiB)
5630	10 February 2009	S60 3rd Ed., FP 2	Candybar	Keypad	240 × 320 (24-bit)	GSM / (E)GPRS / UMTS / HSDPA / HSUPA / Wi-Fi / GPS / A-GPS	MicroSDHC (16 GiB)
5330	11 March 2009	S40 5th Ed., FP 1	Slider	Keypad	240 × 320 (24-bit)	GSM / (E)GPRS / 3G / UMTS / GPS / A-GPS	MicroSDHC (16 GiB)
5730	11 March 2009	S60 3rd Ed., FP 2	Candybar	Keypad, QWERTY keyboard	240 × 320 (24-bit)	GSM / (E)GPRS / UMTS / HSDPA / HSUPA / Wi-Fi / GPS / A-GPS	MicroSDHC (32 GiB)
5530	15 June 2009	S60 5th Edition	Slate	Touch	360 × 640 (24-bit)	GSM / (E)GPRS / Wi-Fi	MicroSDHC (16 GiB)

== See also ==
- Nokia 5200, similar to Nokia 5300 XpressMusic but not "XpressMusic" branded
- Nokia 5030 XpressRadio, extension of the brand tailored for radio
- Nokia N91, music-oriented device from the Nseries which have DAC Sound Chip
- Nokia N81, another music-oriented Nseries device
- Nokia Comes With Music
- Walkman
- Motorola ROKR
- Nokia 5310 (2020): 2020 revival of Nokia 5310 XpressMusic
- Nokia 5710 XpressAudio: 2022 "XpressAudio" branded feature phone with wireless Bluetooth earbuds.
