= Nokia 5200 =

2006 cellphone by Nokia

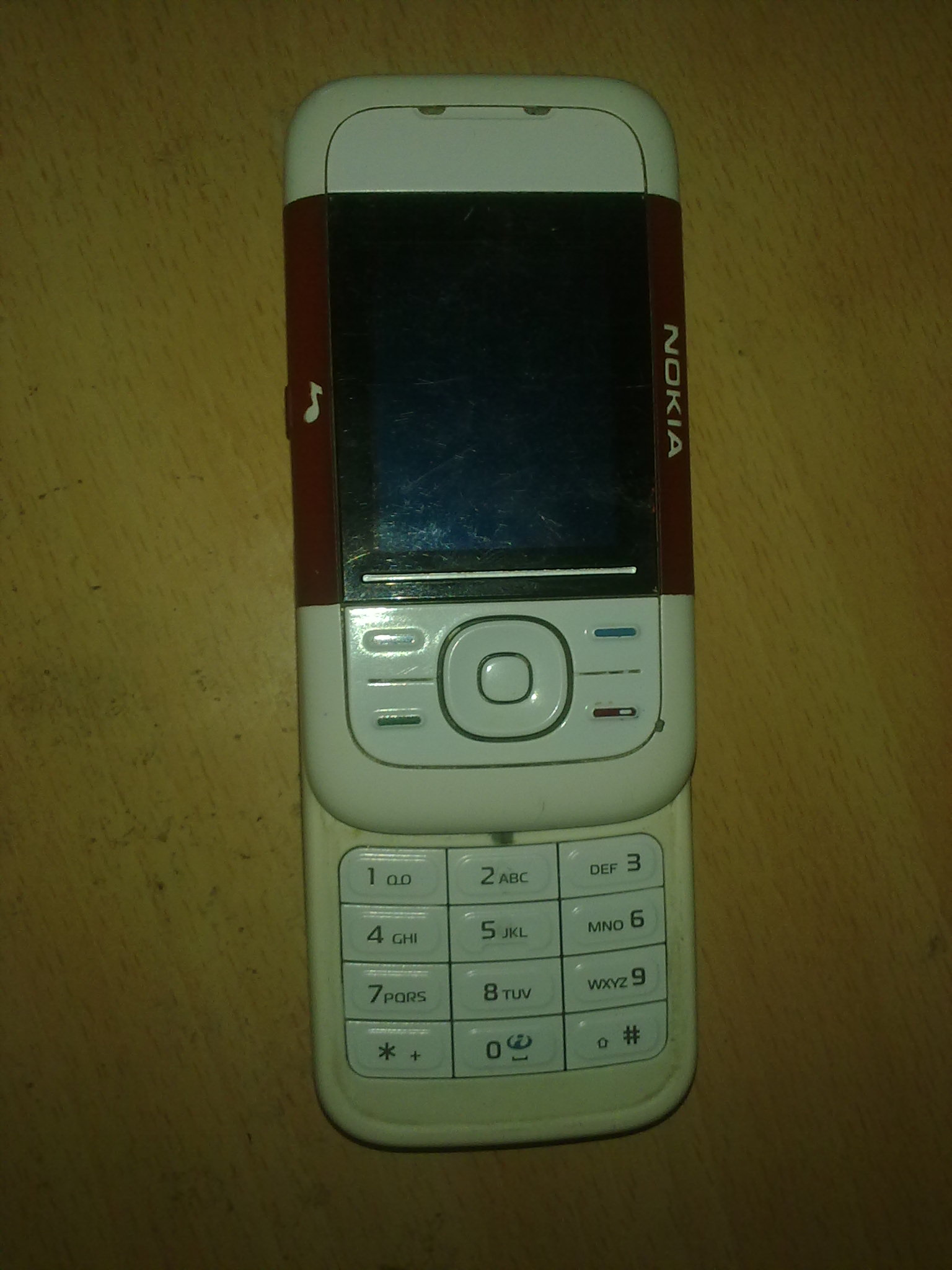
- Red Nokia 5200
- Developer: Nokia
- Discontinued: March 12, 2010
- Units sold: 30+ million total (Note: Including both 5200 and 5300 sales.)
- Predecessor: Nokia 3220
- Successor: Nokia 5310
- Related: Nokia 5300, Nokia 3250
- Compatible networks: GSM 900/1800/1900
- Form factor: Slider
- Colors: Blue; Red; Black
- Dimensions: 92.4×48.2×20.7 mm (3.64×1.90×0.81 in)
- Weight: 112 g (4 oz)
- Memory: 8 MB flash, microSD slot
- Battery: Li-Ion 760 mAh (BL-5B)
- Rear camera: VGA, 640×480 pixels, video
- Display: 128×160, CSTN / TFT, 262,144 colors
- Connectivity: GPRS, HSCSD, EDGE Class 10 236.8 kbit/s, Bluetooth, IrDA, USB; WAP 2.0/xHTML, HTML
- Development status: Discontinued

The Nokia 5200 is a Series 40 mobile phone manufactured by Nokia. Announced on 26 September 2006, it is less featured than its counterpart, the Nokia 5300, and is not XpressMusic branded. It got its last software update in 2008.

== 5200 and 5300 differences ==
The 5300 is very similar in appearance to the 5200. Some of the main differences between the two phones are:

- The 5300 has a larger screen with higher resolution and higher quality: 240×320 versus 128×160.
- A higher resolution (1.3 megapixel) camera is included on the 5300 than the 5200 (VGA).
- The 5300 has more music controls on the side of the phone.

== Features ==
Type	Specification
Weight	104 g
Dimensions	92.4×48.2×20.7 mm
Form factor	Slide phone
Battery life	Talk: 3.2 hours Standby: 263 hours
Display	Type: LCD (color TFT/TFD); Colors: 262,144 (18-bit); Size: 128×160 pixels
Platform / OS	Series 40
Memory	8 MB, 2 GB expandable with microSD cards.
Phone book capacity	1000 entries with five numbers and extra info each
Multiple languages	Yes
Polyphonic ringtones	Yes
Vibrate	Yes
Bluetooth	2.0
USB	Yes
Picture ID	Yes
Ringer ID	Yes
Voice dialing	Yes
Custom graphics	Yes
Custom ringtones	Yes
Flight Mode	Yes
Web browser	Yes, XHTML 2.0
Predictive text entry	Yes, T9
Memory card slot	Card type: microSD
MMS	Yes
Text messaging	Two-way: Yes
Text messaging templates	Yes
Music player	Supported formats: MP3, WMA, AAC, M4A
FM radio	Yes
Camera	VGA w/ effects. Possible resolution: 640×480, 320×240, 160×120
Streaming video	Yes
Video capture	Yes
Alarm	Yes
Calculator	Yes
Calendar	Yes
Games	Canal Control & Snake III + Downloadable
Speaker phone	Yes
