= Nokia X6-00 =

Smartphone and portable entertainment device by Nokia

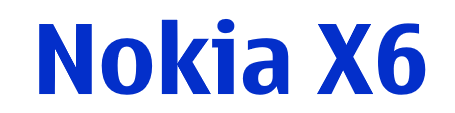

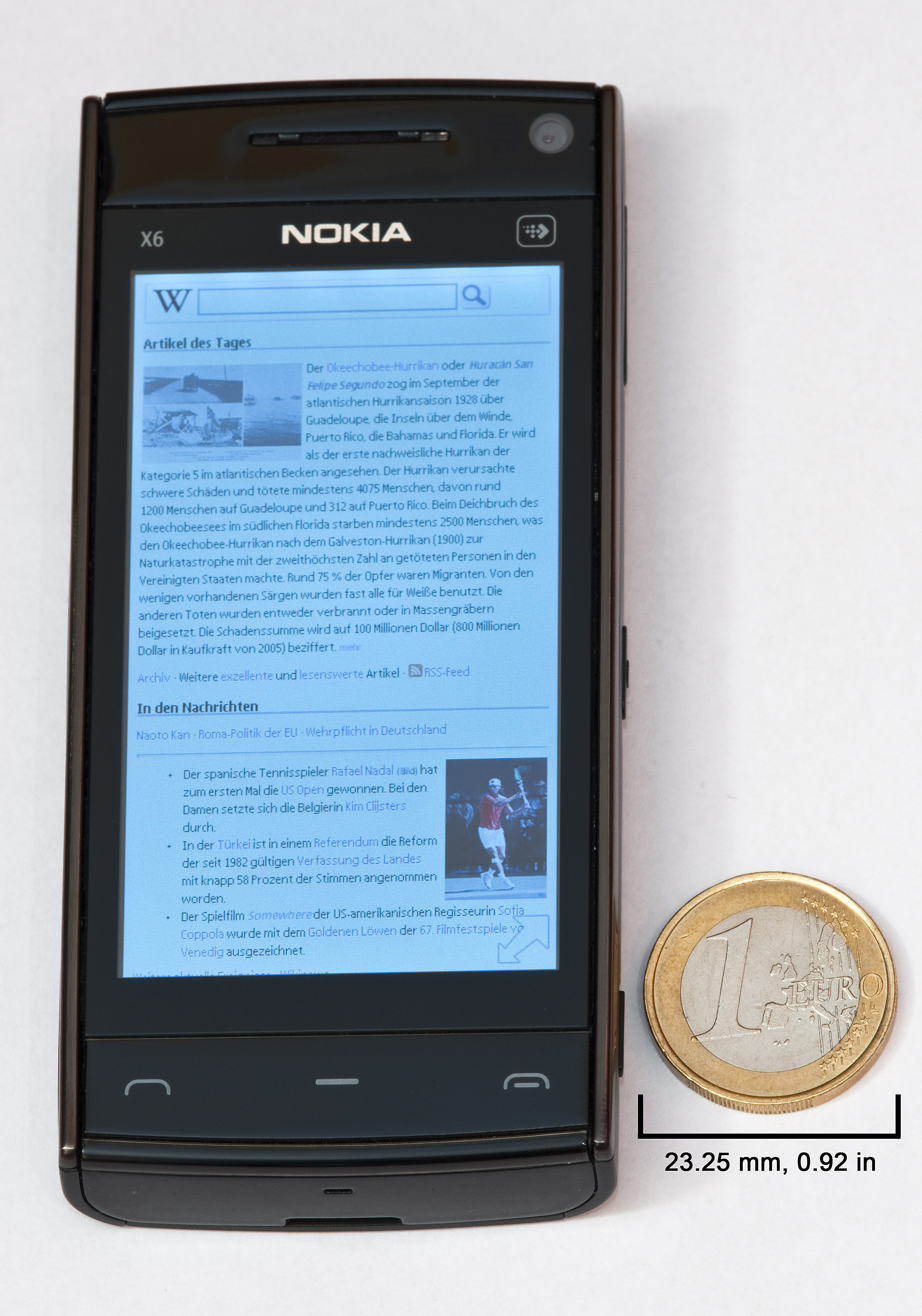
- Manufacturer: Nokia
- Series: Nokia Xseries (Previously XpressMusic)
- Availability by region: December 2009
- Predecessor: Nokia 5800 XpressMusic; Nokia 5530 XpressMusic; Nokia 5630 XpressMusic; Nokia 5730 XpressMusic
- Successor: Nokia X7-00, Nokia X6 (2018)
- Related: Nokia 500
- Compatible networks: (3.5G), UMTS, Quad band GSM / GPRS / EDGE GSM 850, GSM 900, GSM 1800, GSM 1900
- Form factor: candybar
- Dimensions: 111.0×51.0×13.8 mm (4.37×2.01×0.54 in)
- Weight: 122 g (4 oz) (0.269 lb)
- Operating system: Symbian OS 9.4 with Nokia S60 5th Edition UI.
- CPU: ARM 11 clocked at 433.9 Mhz
- Memory: 128 MB SDRAM, 512 MB ROM, 32,16 or 8 GB NAND memory, expandable up to 16 GB.
- Battery: BL-5J (1,320 mAh), AC-8U (2.0 mm power connector)
- Rear camera: 5.0-megapixel with Carl Zeiss optics, 4x digital zoom, dual LED flash, Front-facing CIF camera
- Display: 640×360 (16:9 nHD) 3.2 inch TFT LCD
- Connectivity: WLAN IEEE 802.11 b/g with UPnP, Micro-USB 2.0, Bluetooth 2.1 with A2DP, GPS, aGPS
- Data inputs: Capacitive Touchscreen (single touch only), No stylus required, Proximity sensor, Accelerometer

The Nokia X6 is a music-oriented capacitive touchscreen smartphone and portable entertainment device by Nokia. It was announced on 1 September 2009 during Nokia World 2009 in Germany.

The X6 replaces the Nokia 5800 as Nokia's flagship music-centred model. Both still slot below the high-end touchscreen model Nokia N97. The X6 was Nokia's first with a capacitive touchscreen.

The X6 and the Nokia X3-00 are the first devices in newly installed Nokia Xseries. Before the Xseries, Nokia's music-centred devices were branded XpressMusic. With the X6 (and the X3 introduced same day), Nokia launched its new simpler naming strategy with just one number after the series letter.

== Release ==
The original X6 includes the Comes With Music program and a licence for unlimited free downloads from the Nokia Music Store. The Comes With Music version shipped in late 2009 for an estimated retail price of £529.99 or €605.

The name is later reused by HMD global for a new Android smartphone, the Nokia X6 (2018).

== Hardware revisions ==
A version without Comes With Music support at €200 less was released on 23 February 2010. This version has 16 GB of on-board storage. Another cheaper variation of the X6 also without Comes With Music support was released by Nokia in mid-2010. This version has 8 GB of on-board storage and was released in Asia and North America. The 32 GB version was not released in India instead the 8 GB and 16 GB versions were provided with Ovi Music Unlimited offer.

== Appearance ==
The X6 is notable for its slimmer body than the 5800 (13.8 mm) and 35 hours of continuous music playback and its fast 3g network. For social networking, it supports easy access to Facebook, MySpace, Ovi, Yahoo IM, YouTube, VK, Windows Live and more.

== Features ==
- WCDMA, GPRS/EDGE, HSDPA up to 3.6 Mbit/s
- Size: 111 × 51 × 13.8 mm
- Display: 3.2-inch (8.1 cm) 16:9 widescreen nHD, 231 ppi, capacitive touchscreen.
- Scratch-resistant screen
- Integrated and Assisted GPS
- 5-megapixel camera with auto-focus and Carl Zeiss optics, dual LED flash
- High speed Micro-USB connector (Micro-B receptacle)
- Wireless LAN (WLAN)

== Other services, features or applications ==
- Image and video editor, Video centre, Online Share, Download (where Ovi Store is not supported), Email Settings wizard, Switch, Playlist DJ, Nokia Maps 3.0, Embedded premium game Spore, Online Search, Email clients
- OVI services: Nokia Music Store, Ovi Store, Nokia Messaging, Ovi Maps, Ovi Share, Ovi Contacts, Ovi Files, Ovi Suite 1.1 for PC
- Downloadable Symbian (sis), Java applications, and widgets
- 3 games included: Store by EA, Asphalt4 and DJ Mix Tour by Gameloft

=== Operating times ===
- Talk time: Up to 6 hours
- Standby time: Up to 420 hours
- Music playback: up to 35 hours
- Video playback: up to 4 hours

== Firmware updates ==
A new software update has been released for Nokia X6-00, version 40.0.002, which brings a new version of Ovi Maps and Ovi Store, improved browser and improved chat in Ovi Contacts.

- New web browser version 7.3.1.33
- Updated Mail for Exchange
- Updated Shazam
- Usability improvements
- Smileys in Messaging
- Swipe to unlock screen and keys

However the updates are not possible via the phone and require a Windows computer to perform. Nokia was willing to update the devices by mail for those that did not have a Windows PC.

=== Unofficial ===
Hobbyists have provided unofficial Symbian Anna firmware releases.

In 2014, enthusiast of Symbian^1 generation Nokia smartphones release last update of his firmware modification for 10 different models of Nokia smartphones.

== Reception ==
The Inquirer reviewed the Nokia X6-00 and rated it 8 out of 10. It called it a much better all round device than the Nokia 5800 XpressMusic.

== See also ==
- Nokia Maps
- Nokia PC Suite
- Nokia Software Updater
- symbian

== Sources ==
- Official Nokia UK page
- Nokia forum page with more details
- https://web.archive.org/web/20110927221218/http://www.infosyncworld.com/reviews/cell-phones/nokia-x6/10482.html
- https://www.pcmag.com/article2/0,2817,2352501,00.asp
- https://www.mirror.co.uk/news/technology/2009/09/09/techie-breakie-nokia-x6-gran-turismo-5-115875-21659774/
- guardian.co.uk
