= Nokia 5610 XpressMusic =

Mobile phone model

Nokia 5610
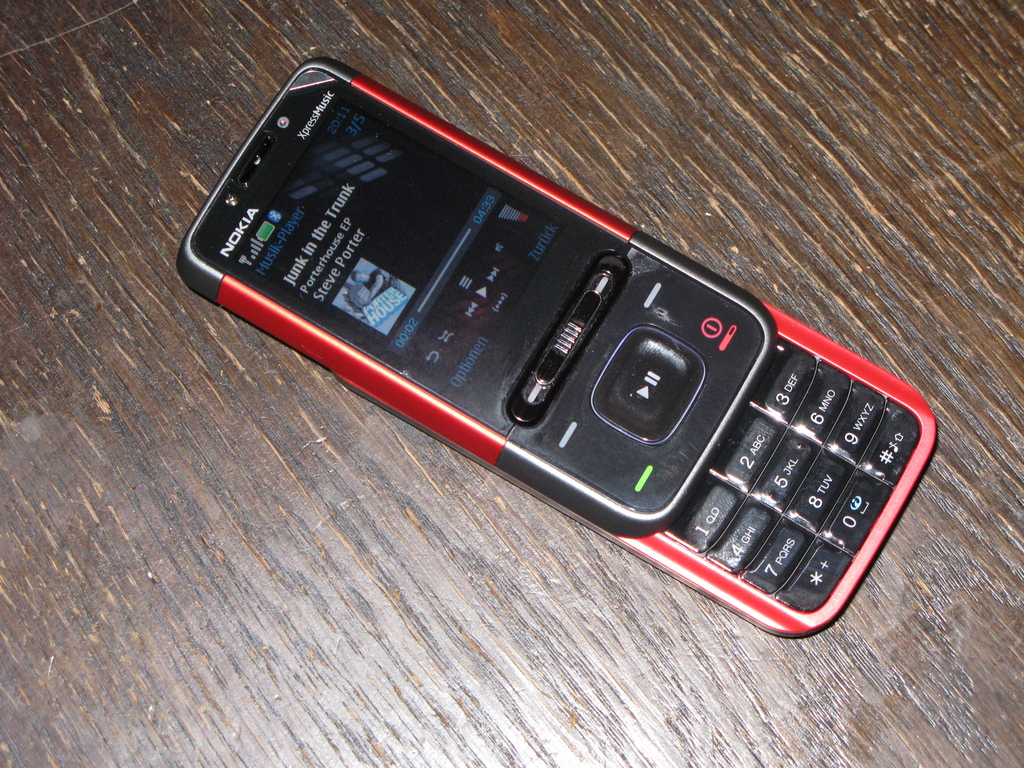
- Manufacturer: Nokia
- Availability by region: December 2007
- Predecessor: Nokia 5300
- Successor: Nokia 5730 XpressMusic; Nokia 5800 XpressMusic; Nokia X3-00
- Related: Nokia 5310; Nokia 6500 slide
- Compatible networks: GSM 850/900/1800/1900, UMTS 850/2100(RM-242) 850/1900(RM-279)
- Form factor: Slider
- Dimensions: 98.5×48.5×17 mm (3.88×1.91×0.67 in)
- Weight: 111 g (4 oz)
- Operating system: Series 40 5th Edition
- CPU: Unknown CPU
- Memory: 20MB internal memory
- Removable storage: microSD (supports up to 4 GB)
- Battery: Li-Ion 900 mAh (BP-5M)
- Rear camera: 3.2 Mpix / 2048 x 1536 px AF, Dual-LED Flash
- Front camera: VGA videocall (front)
- Display: 240 x 320 px, 2.2", TFT LCD
- Connectivity: Bluetooth 2.0, MicroUSB
- Data inputs: Keypad

The Nokia 5610 is a slider mobile phone from Nokia part of the XpressMusic series. Introduced August 2007 and launched in December, it runs on the Series 40 platform. The 5610's design is similar to that of the Nokia 5310 XpressMusic (announced same day), with aluminium brushed sides and bold side colours of either red, blue, white, or pink. Above the regular D-pad with music buttons, the 5610 features a "sliding switch" below the display for navigation. The phone is shown on Panic! at the Disco "That Green Gentleman (Things Have Changed)" music video.

== LCD screen issues ==
This phone has a known LCD screen defect that causes the screen to cease functioning. T-Mobile was aware of this and only temporarily halted sales before putting the phone back on the market, regardless of the problem never being fixed. Upon further investigation, it appears as though the connector to the LCD becomes worn down and the protective layer breaks due to friction from operation of the slider.

== See also ==
- Nokia N81
- Nokia N91
- Sony Ericsson W660i
- Sony Ericsson W910
- Sony Ericsson W760
- Sony Ericsson W595
- Samsung J610
- LG Shine
