= Nokia 5730 XpressMusic =

Mobile phone by Nokia

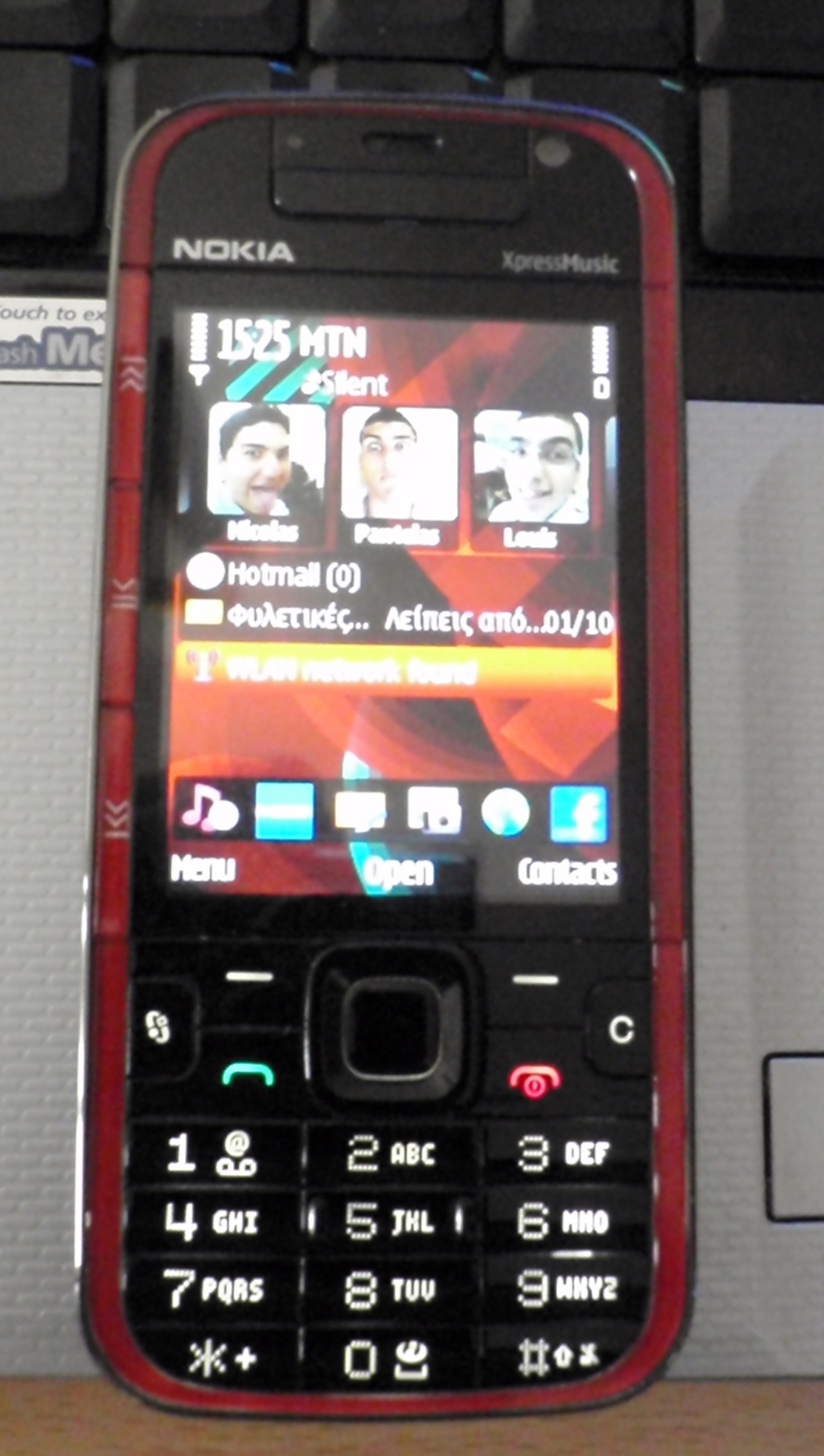
- The Nokia 5730 at its homescreen
- Manufacturer: Nokia
- Availability by region: 2009
- Predecessor: Nokia 5320; Nokia 5610 XpressMusic
- Successor: Nokia X6-00
- Related: Nokia 5630 XpressMusic; Nokia E75; Nokia 6760 slide
- Compatible networks: GSM, EGPRS, WCDMA, HSDPA, A-GPS
- Form factor: Candybar
- Dimensions: 112×51×15.4 mm (4.41×2.01×0.61 in)
- Weight: 135 g (5 oz)
- Operating system: S60 3rd Edition Feature Pack 2
- CPU: ARM11 369 MHz Freescale MXC300-30 processor
- Memory: 128 MB SDRAM
- Removable storage: microSD, up to 16 GB (8 GB included)
- Battery: BL-4U (3.7 V, 1000 mAh)
- Rear camera: 3.2 megapixels, Carl Zeiss AG optics with autofocus and LED flash
- Front camera: Front camera for video calls
- Display: 2.4 inch TFT QVGA (320 × 240 pixels), 16.7 million colors
- Connectivity: Bluetooth 2.0 (EDR/A2DP), Wi-Fi (802.11 b/g), MicroUSB 2.0, 3.5 mm headphone jack
- Data inputs: Keypad and slide-out QWERTY keyboard

The Nokia 5730 XpressMusic is a Symbian-powered smartphone by Nokia, announced on March 11, 2009. It features both a side sliding QWERTY keyboard and a numerical keypad. It is compatible with the Nokia Mobile TV Headset (SU-33W).
