= Nokia 5530 XpressMusic =

Mobile phone model

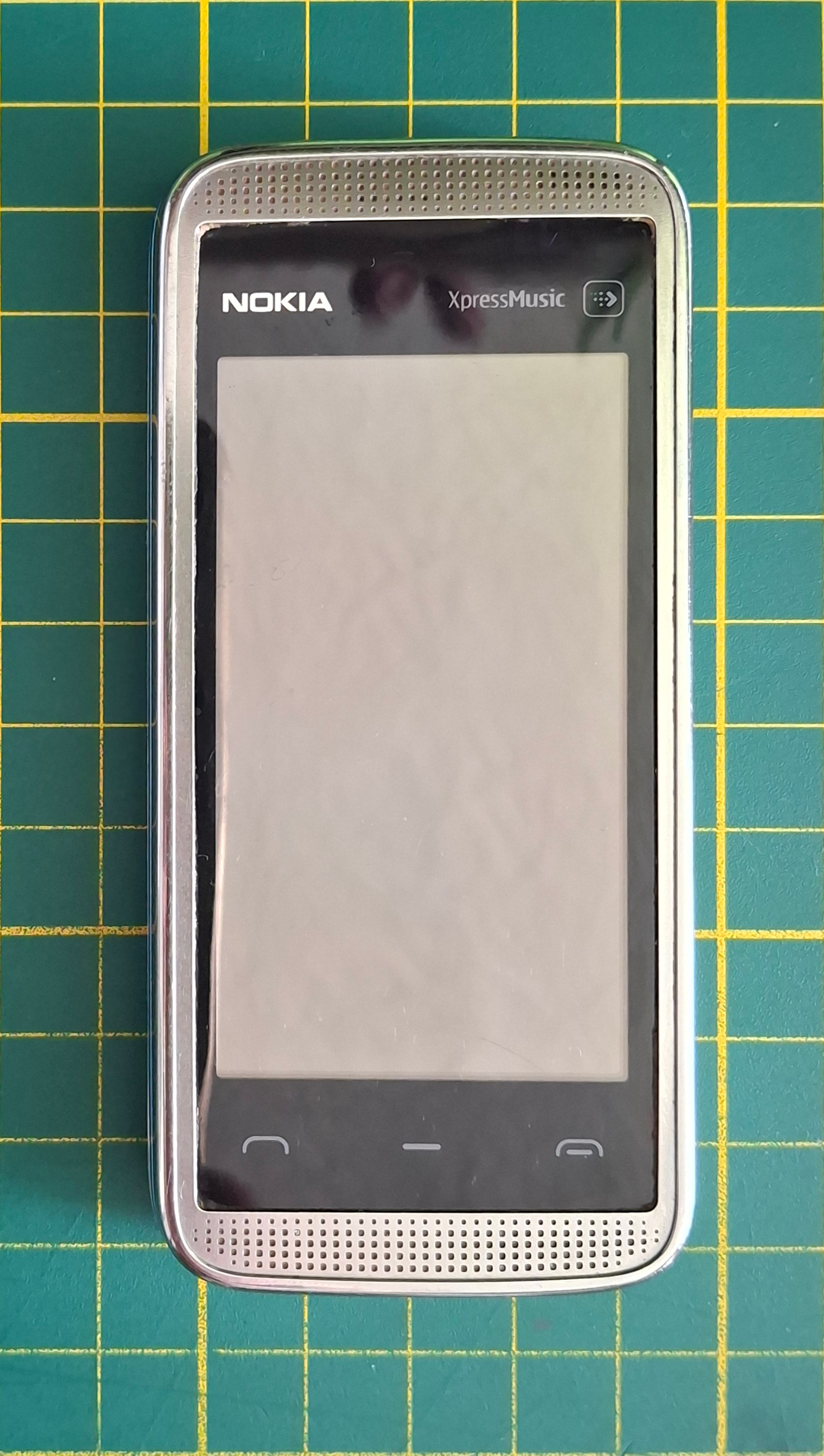
- Manufacturer: Nokia
- Availability by region: August 2009
- Predecessor: Nokia 5220
- Successor: Nokia C6-00; Nokia X5-01
- Related: XpressMusic
- Compatible networks: GSM, EGPRS UMTS
- Form factor: Candybar
- Dimensions: 104×49×13 mm (4.09×1.93×0.51 in)
- Weight: 107 g (4 oz)
- Operating system: Symbian OS 9.4 + S60 platform 5th Edition, Firmware version 40.0.003
- CPU: ARM11 @ 434 MHz
- Memory: 128 MB SDRAM
- Removable storage: max. 16 GB microSDHC (32 GB unofficial), 4 GB card included, Internal 70MB memory
- Battery: BL-4U (3.7V 1000mAh)
- Rear camera: 3.2 Megapixels with autofocus, monoflash LED
- Display: nHD 640 x 360 pixels, 2.9-inch 16:9 widescreen, (16.7 million colors)
- Connectivity: Bluetooth 2.0 (EDR/A2DP), WLAN (802.11 b/g), MicroUSB 2.0; 3.5 mm headphone and video-out jack
- Data inputs: Resistive Touchscreen with Nokia Dynamic Intelligent Layouts

The Nokia 5530 XpressMusic is a smartphone by Nokia announced on 15 June 2009. Part of the XpressMusic series of phones, it emphasizes music and multimedia playback. It is Nokia's third touchscreen phone (after the 5800 and N97) based on the Symbian OS (S60) 5th edition platform.

In terms of specifications, it rests between the lower Nokia 5230 and the higher 5800. Bearing a much lower price tag, it lacks the 5800's 3G capability and GPS receiver, but has a more compact and sleek design than both models, as well as stereo speakers.

== See also ==
- Nokia X6
- Nokia 5530 series
