= Nokia 5630 XpressMusic =

Mobile phone model

- Manufacturer: Nokia
- Availability by region: 2009
- Predecessor: Nokia 5320 XpressMusic
- Successor: Nokia X6-00; Nokia C5-00
- Related: Nokia 5730 XpressMusic
- Compatible networks: GSM, EGPRS, WCDMA, HSDPA, HSUPA
- Form factor: Candybar
- Dimensions: 112×46×12 mm (4.41×1.81×0.47 in)
- Weight: 83 g (3 oz)
- Operating system: S60 3rd Edition Feature Pack 2
- CPU: ARM11 600 MHz Samsung K5W4G2GACA – AL54 processor
- Memory: 128 MB SDRAM
- Removable storage: max. 16 GB microSD, 4 GB card included
- Battery: BL-4CT (3.7V 860mAh)
- Rear camera: 3.2-megapixel camera with EDOF and dual LED flash
- Front camera: 0.3-megapixel front camera for video calls
- Display: TFT QVGA 320 x 240 pixels, 2.2 inch (16.7 million colors)
- Connectivity: Bluetooth 2.0 (EDR/A2DP), WLAN (802.11 b/g), MicroUSB 2.0; 3.5 mm headphone jack
- Data inputs: Numeric keyboard and five-way joystick

The Nokia 5630 XpressMusic is a Symbian-powered smartphone by Nokia, announced in February and released in June 2009.
