= Raging Thunder =

2006 video game

- App icon (Symbian version)
- Developer: Polarbit
- Publishers: Polarbit; Filao
- Engine: Fuse
- Platforms: Mobile: Symbian, Palm OS, Windows Mobile, iPhone OS, Android, J2ME, BREW, WIPI
- Release: 2006
- Genre: Racing
- Mode: Single player

Raging Thunder is a racing video game for mobile platforms created by Swedish developer Polarbit, released in 2006. It was at the time an impressive 3D game for high-end platforms, taking advantage of hardware acceleration and accelerometer tilting. A separate top-down 2D version in Java format was also made.

== Gameplay ==
The game is an arcade-style racer where the player races against three opponents. Each of the four cars have their unique attributes. To boost speed, players can collect lightning-bolt icons scattered across the tracks, but should avoid smiling" skull icons which instead drains the car's power.

== Development and release ==
Polarbit is a Swedish studio founded in 2005. The core intention behind the creators was to lead the market in developing games and middleware for high-end devices and in turn inspire the entire industry. They designed a game development framework named Fuse.

Raging Thunder was Polarbit's first game release in early 2006 and attracted some rave reviews. It was released on Palm OS, Pocket PC and Smartphone, and Symbian S60 platforms initially. By late 2006 it had versions running on Symbian UIQ, WIPI and BREW runtime platforms. At first Raging Thunder was distributed over download stores like Handango, but on 24 October 2006 Polarbit made a publisher announcement with French company Filao to distribute it over the air to major telecom carriers and expanding the game's public attention.

A stripped-down Java version was also released in 2D capable of running on handsets with MIDP 1.0 and 2.0 runtime environments. In 2008, Raging Thunder was ported to iPhone OS and was released as a free beta to the jailbreaking community. It received its official release onto the App Store on 22 September 2008. On 12 December 2009, Raging Thunder was released onto the Android Market and five days later on the Ovi Store as a reworked version for touchscreen S60 phones. Cross-platform multiplayer was also built allowing users of all three platforms to battle each other.

== Reception ==
Raging Thunder received mainly positive reviews because of its visuals and the cross-platform online multiplayer.

Pocket Gamer tried the Symbian version in April 2006 and gave a score of four out of five. The reviewer praised it for: "bringing big-boy console sensibilities to a mobile phone, it's to be applauded." The publication also compared it to Ridge Racer.

IGN said in a 2008 review that the iPhone/iPod Touch version (then newly released) is not good enough for its price and scored it six out of ten.

Online mobile game journal MobileGameFaqs named Raging Thunder the best driving game of 2006. It was also one of the nominees at the International Mobile Gaming Awards (IMGA).

== Sequels ==
Polarbit expanded on Raging Thunder with a series. Global Race: Raging Thunder was co-developed with Gamelion and was released in June 2007, published by Nokia. This version was available for free with the Nokia E90 Communicator to showcase its hardware acceleration capabilities. The game was later also offered by Nokia for free with other handsets or came preloaded like on the Nokia 5800 XpressMusic.

Raging Thunder 2 co-developed with Pixelbite was released on 4 March 2010 first for Android, iPhone and iPod Touch and then for iPad too. It was later also ported to other platforms including Symbian, Palm webOS, BlackBerry PlayBook and Zeebo. An optimised version was released as a launch title for the Sony Ericsson Xperia Play.
