= Nokia 5700 XpressMusic =

Mobile phone by Nokia

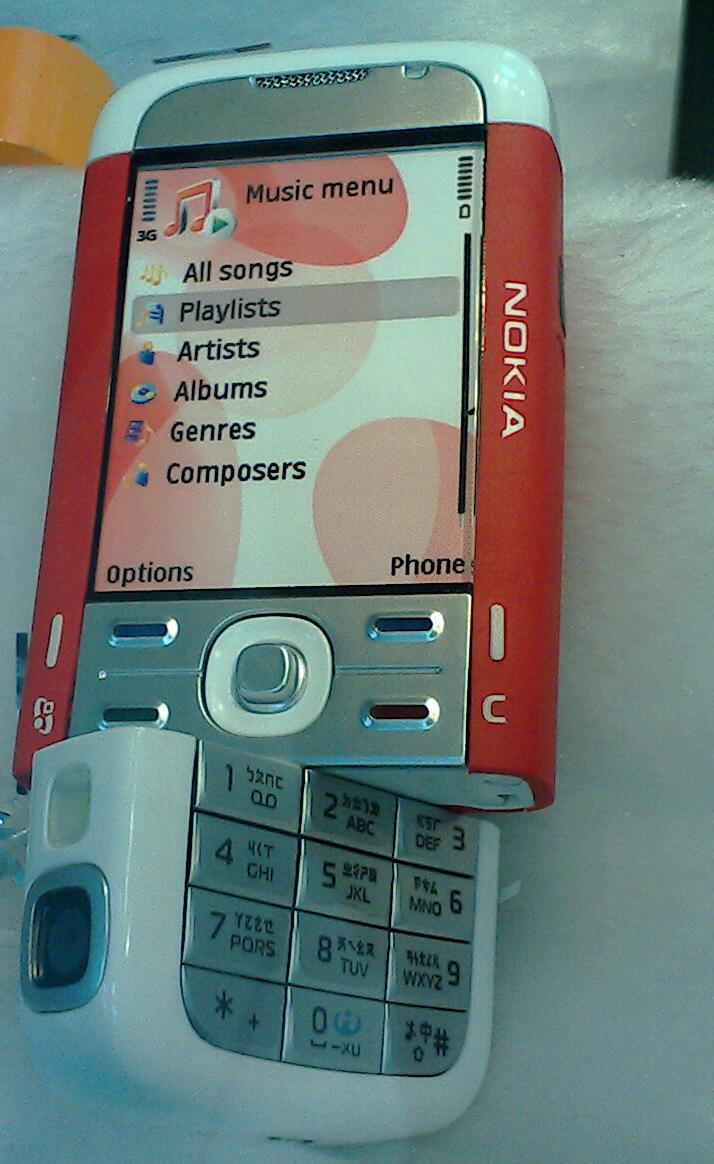
- Manufacturer: Nokia
- Availability by region: April 2007
- Predecessor: Nokia 3250
- Successor: Nokia 5320 XpressMusic; Nokia 5800 XpressMusic
- Related: XpressMusic
- Compatible networks: GSM 850 / 900 / GSM 1800 / GSM 1900
- Form factor: Candybar
- Dimensions: 108×50×17 mm (4.25×1.97×0.67 in), 84 cc
- Weight: 115 g (4 oz)
- Operating system: Symbian OS 9.2 + S60 platform 3rd Edition, Feature Pack 1
- CPU: ARM11 @ 369 MHz CPU
- Memory: 64 MB SDRAM, 128 MB ROM, 38 MB user memory
- Removable storage: microSD up to 32GB (TransFlash)
- Battery: Li-Ion 900 mAh
- Rear camera: 2 Megapixels, 1600x1200 pixels, video (QVGA)
- Display: 240 x 320 pixels, 2.2 inches, TFT LCD, (16 Million Colours)
- Connectivity: Bluetooth 2.0 with A2DP, Infrared, 2.0 mini-USB
- Data inputs: Keypad

Nokia 5700 XpressMusic is a mobile phone by Nokia, announced on March 29, 2007, as the successor to the Nokia 3250, but also looks very similar to Nokia 5300. It is a Symbian S60 3rd Edition FP1 smartphone that was sold under the XpressMusic sub-brand, which emphasises music and multimedia playback. The Nokia 5700 XpressMusic is a monoblock twistable phone which weighs 115 g. It has a casing made of glossy white plastic, and a black or red mat plastic middle section. There is a rubber flap on the right hand side which covers a microSD hotswap card slot, USB port and charging jack.

== Twist keypad ==
The phone's keypad was designed to be twisted to four different positions, each allowing easier access to a specific function of the phone:

Keypad facing forward
The main mode of the Nokia 5700 XpressMusic. In this position the keypad works like the one on any other phone.
Playback controls facing forward
Twisting the keypad around to this position automatically activates the music player.
Camera facing away
This position automatically starts the camera application to take pictures or create videos. If the phone's video player application is being used, twisting to this position automatically changes the video to horizontal full screen mode, and it is possible to stand the 5700 on its side in this position so it is easier to watch videos.
Camera facing forward
This position automatically starts the camera application and is intended for self-portraits and for videophone calls. This position lets the phone be laid down horizontally on its side for hands-free use of the video camera.
