= EDOF =

EDOF may refer to:

- Extended depth of field in a fixed-focus lens
- Extended depth of focus lens, an intraocular lens
