= Nokia 5220 =

2008 cell phone model

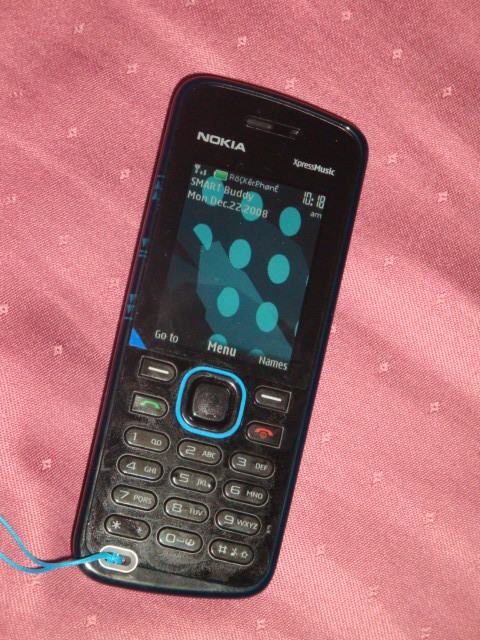
- Manufacturer: Nokia
- First released: April 2008
- Predecessor: Nokia 3500 classic Nokia 5070
- Successor: Nokia 5130; Nokia 5530 XpressMusic
- Related: Nokia 5320 XpressMusic
- Compatible networks: RM-411(EMEA); GSM 900 1800 1900; RM-410(Americas): GSM 850 1800 1900; EDGE class 32
- Form factor: Candybar
- CPU: 231 MHz ARM9
- Removable storage: microSDHC (supports up to 8 GB)
- Battery: 1020 mAh li-ion
- Rear camera: 2 MP; 4x digital zoom
- Display: LCD; 240x320 px 256k colors
- Connectivity: Micro-USB connector Bluetooth
- Data inputs: Keypad
- Other: FM radio

The Nokia 5220 XpressMusic is a mobile telephone handset Nokia released in July 2008. Its design features an unusual asymmetric shape and one of the slimmest profiles within the XpressMusic line.

== Specifications ==
Type	Specification
Modes	RM-411(EMEA model): GSM 900 / 1800 / 1900 RM-410(Americas Model): GSM 850 / 1800 / 1900
Weight	78 g
Dimensions	108 mm x 43.5 mm x 10.5 mm
Form Factor	Candybar
Battery Life	Talk: 5 hours Standby: 408 hrs (17 days)
Battery Type	Li-Ion 1020 mAh
CPU	ARM9 231 MHz
Display	Type: LCD (Color) Colors: 256 thousand (24-bit) Resolution: 240 × 320 pixels (QVGA)
User Interface	Nokia Series 40
Memory	30 MB (built-in, flash shared memory) 512 MB memory card included.
Bluetooth	Supported
USB	Built-in Micro-USB connector
Packet Data	Technology: EDGE (EGPRS) class 32
Side Keys	dedicated music keys
Memory Card Slot	Card type: microSD (supports SDHC) up to 8 GB
FM Radio	Stereo: Yes
Music player	Supported formats: MP3, eAAC+, WMA, aac, MP4, m4a
Camera	Resolution: 2-megapixel with 4× digital zoom

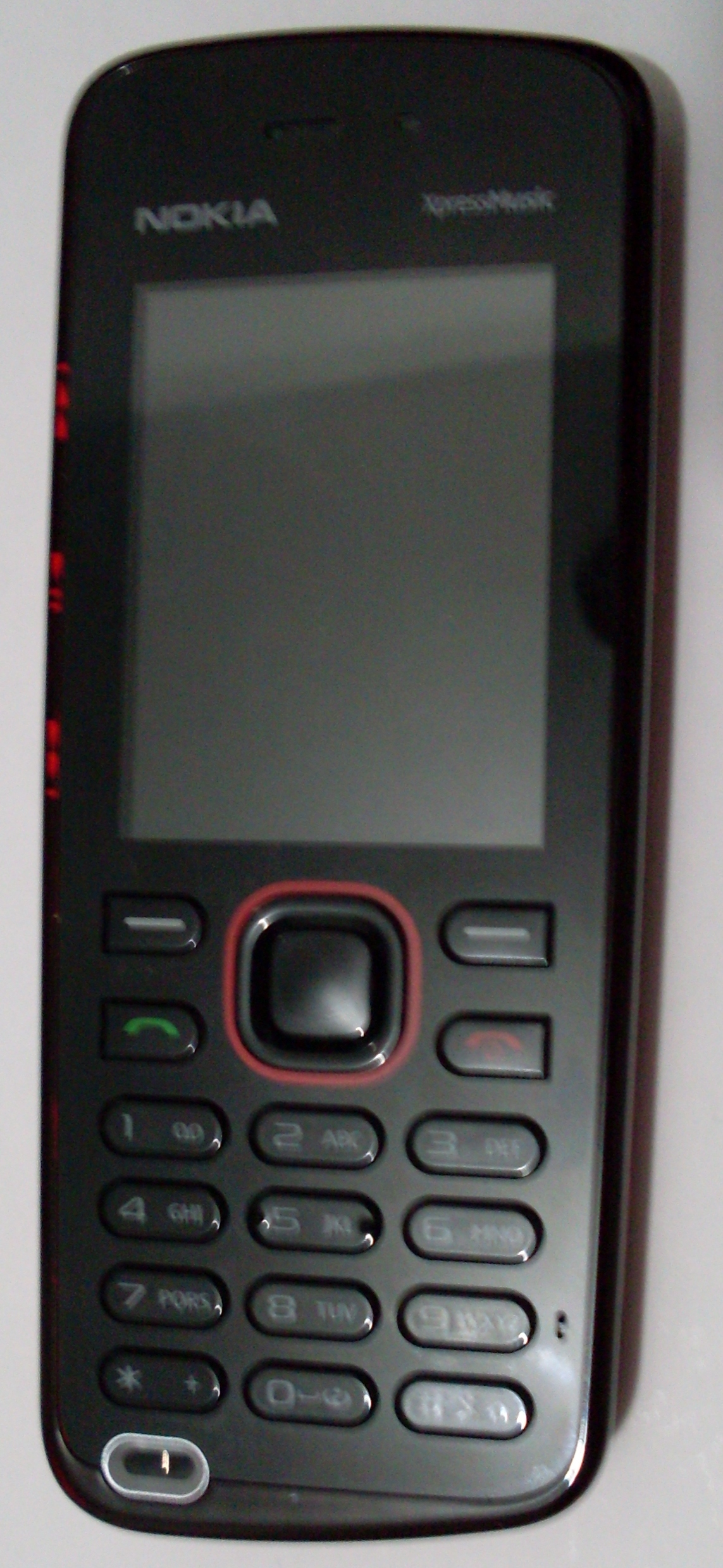
Front view

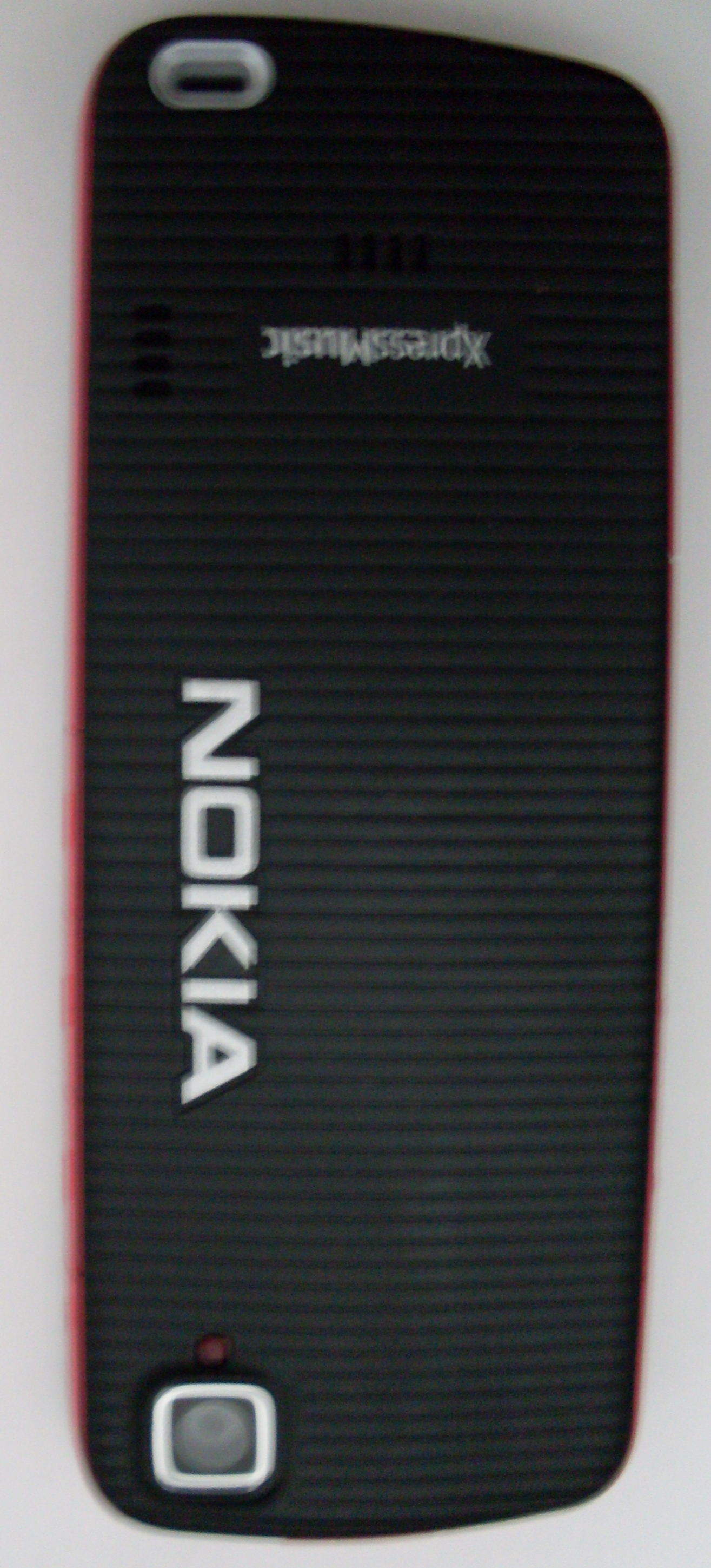
Back view

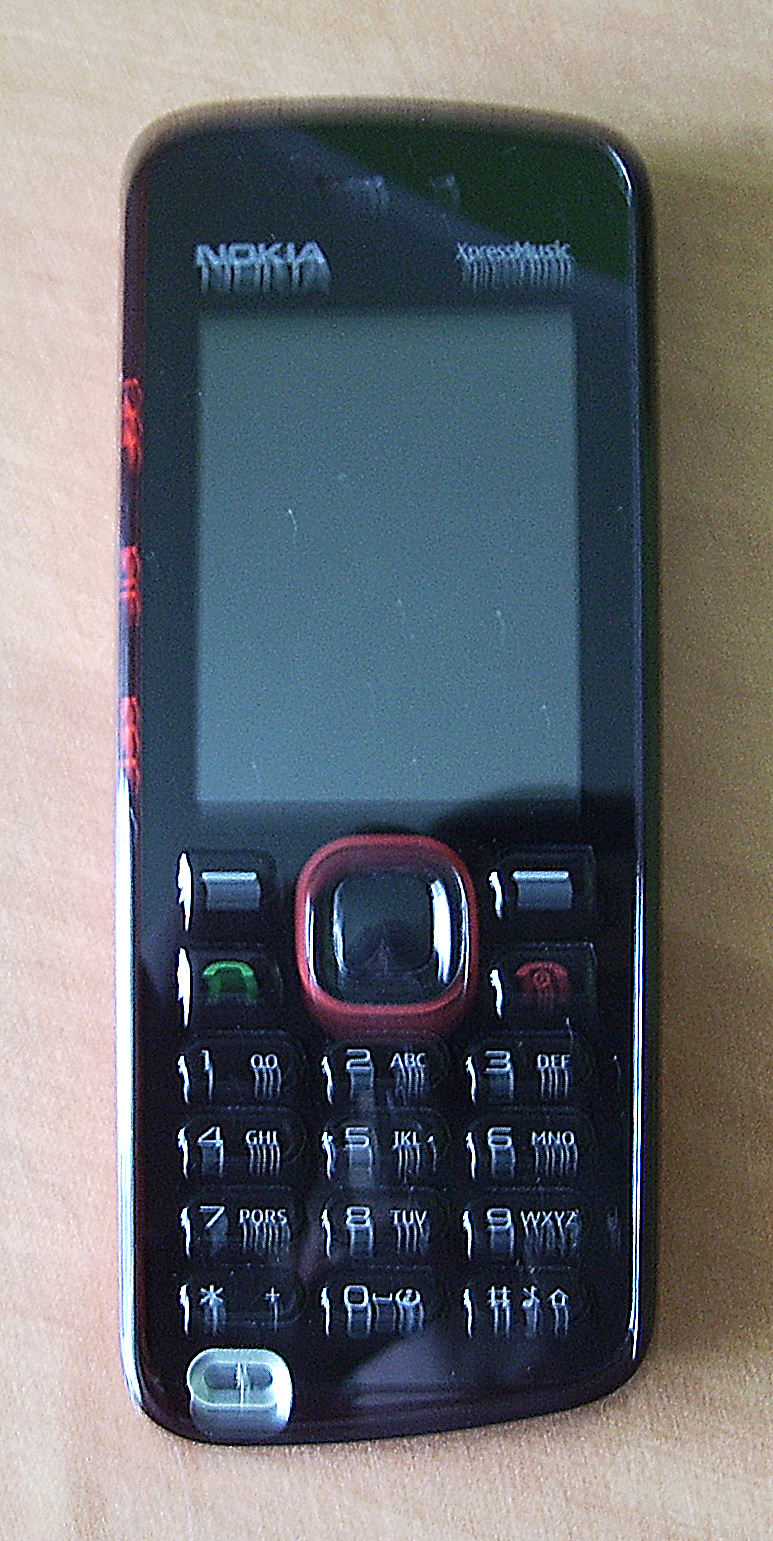
