= Nokia 3250 =

Mobile phone

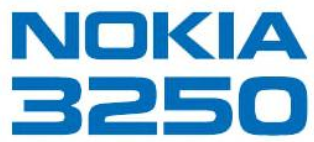

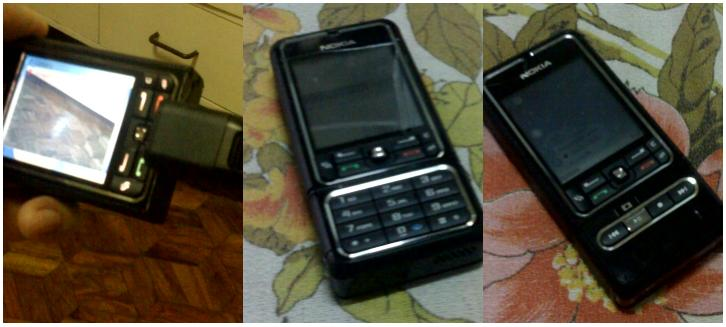
- Manufacturer: Nokia
- First released: September 26, 2005; 20 years ago
- Availability by region: March 2006
- Discontinued: Q3/Q4 2007
- Predecessor: Nokia 3230
- Successor: Nokia 5700 XpressMusic
- Compatible networks: GPRS class 10, EDGE
- Form factor: Twist
- Dimensions: 103.8×50×19.8 mm (4.09×1.97×0.78 in)
- Weight: 115 g (4 oz)
- Operating system: S60 (3rd Edition)
- Memory: 32 MB SDRAM
- Storage: 10 MB
- Removable storage: microSD (supports up to 2 GB)
- Battery: BP-6M (1100 mA·h)
- Rear camera: 2.0 megapixels, 4x digital zoom
- Display: TFT Matrix, 262144 colors, 176x208 pixels
- Data inputs: Keypad

The Nokia 3250 (code-named Thunder) is a mobile phone running Symbian OS v9.1 (S60 3rd Edition), announced on 26 September 2005. It features a unique 'twist' design that transforms the traditional phone keypad into a camera (90° CW/CCW) and dedicated music control keys (180° CCW). It was marketed as a music phone and can store up to 2 gigabytes of music (500 songs) and other data thanks to a microSD memory card slot, and features a two-megapixel camera as well as other smartphone capabilities.

The triband GSM 900/1800/1900 model started shipping in the first quarter of 2006 with an estimated retail price of 300 EUR before subsidies or taxes.

== Specification sheet ==
Feature	Specification
Operating System	Symbian OS (9.1) + Series 60 v3
GSM frequencies	900/1800/1900 MHz
EDGE (EGPRS)	Yes, class 10
Video recording	Yes, MPEG-4 Simple Profile at QCIF or SubQCIF, 15 frames per second (max. clip length 1 hour)
Multimedia Messaging	Yes
Video calls	No
Push to Talk over Cellular (PoC)	Yes
Java support	Yes, MIDP 2.0, CLDC 1.1
Bluetooth	Yes, 1.2; Profiles supported: Basic Printing, Generic Access, Serial Port, Dial-up Networking, Headset, Handsfree, Generic Object Exchange, Object Push, File Transfer, Basic Imaging, SIM Access, and Human Interface Device
Data cable support	Yes
Browser	WAP 2.0 XHTML/HTML
Email	Yes
Music player	Yes
Video Player	Yes (RealPlayer)
HF speakerphone	Yes
Offline mode	Yes
Talk time	3 hours
Standby time	1 days (24 hours)

== Key features ==
- Twist: 3 twists for 3 modes of operation
- Optimized, easy to use music player: Music collection management and playlist editing in device
- 2-megapixel camera with 4x zoom
- 10 MB internal memory, hot swappable microSD up to 1 GB. The phone can now take a 2 GB MicroSD with firmware V3.24 and above.
- Sales package includes 512 MB microSD inbox
- GSM/EDGE 900/1800/1900
- USB 2.0 Full Speed with Mass Storage profile
- Stereo am Radio playback including Visual Radio functionality
- Tutorial Application
- Sound Meter application
- Picture editor
- Movie maker
- Lifeblog application
- Setting Wizard (automatically sets the configuration settings of the phone for e-mail and network)
- Comes standard with a full web browser

== Music ==
- Playback time: up to 10 hours
- Supports microSD cards up to 2 GB (1500 songs, with latest firmware)
- Supports WMA, M4A, MP3, AAc, eAAC and eAAC+ music files
- Audio setting include different equalizer settings, Stereo Widening and Bass Boost
- Nokia Audio Manager
- Music Library

== Camera ==
- Resolution of images: 1600x1200 (default), 1152x864, 640x480
- Resolution of videos: 176x144, 128x96
- Streaming and video capture: H.263, 3GPP and Real V8

== Connectivity ==
- USB Data Cable
- Bluetooth
- Nokia PC Suite
