= Nokia 5800 XpressMusic =

2008 smartphone by Nokia

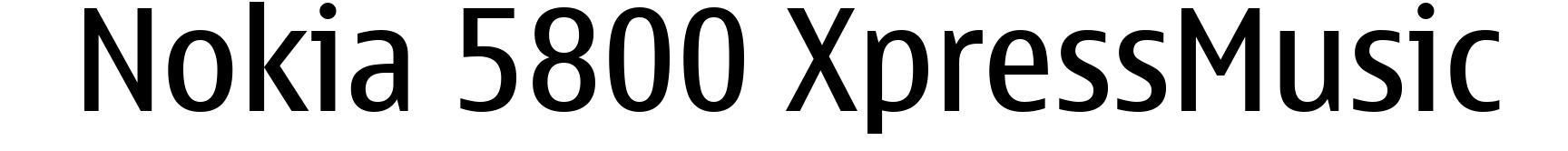

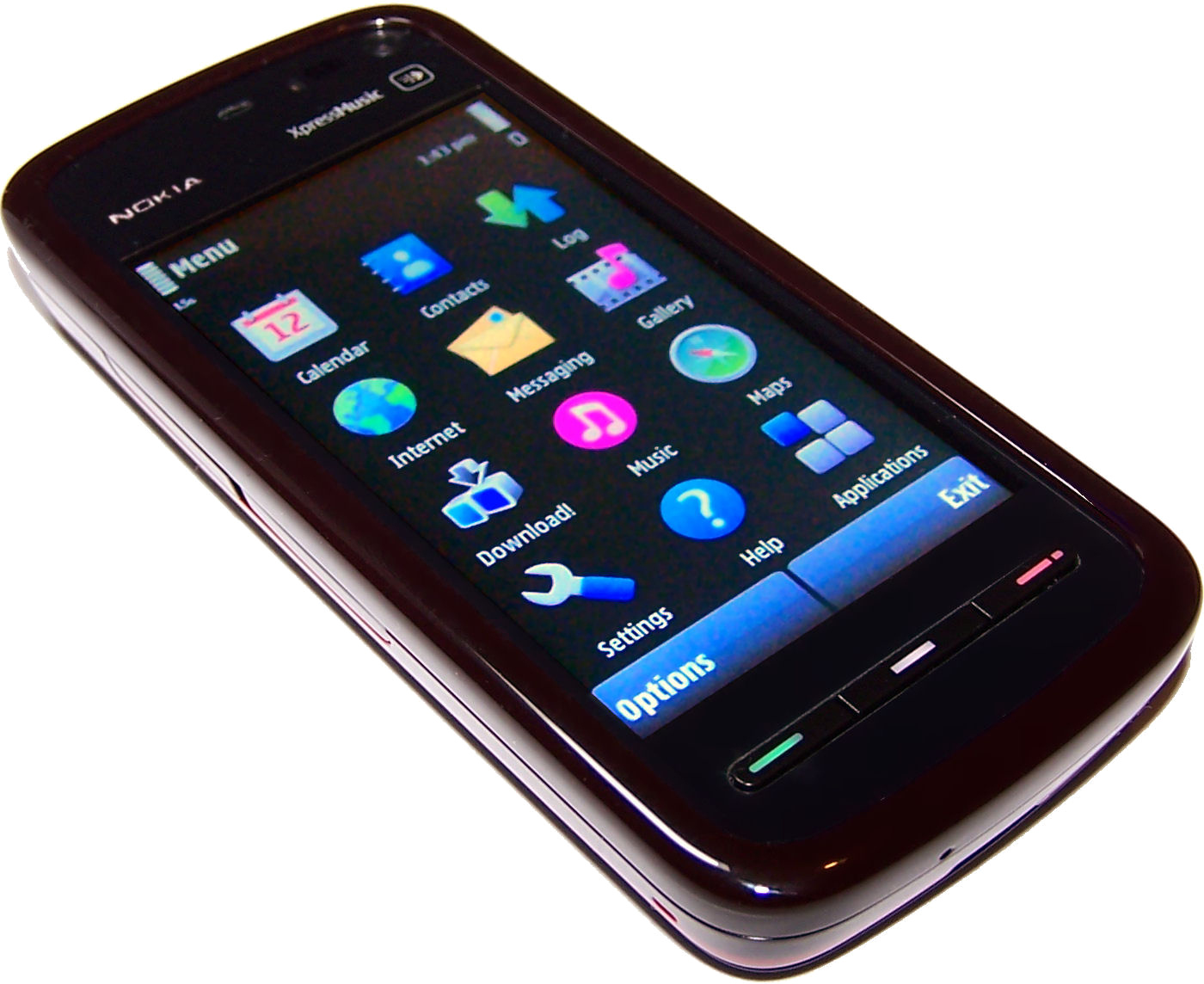
- Manufacturer: Nokia
- Availability by region: November 2008
- Discontinued: 2010
- Predecessor: Nokia 5700 XpressMusic; Nokia 5610 XpressMusic
- Successor: Nokia X6; Nokia C7-00
- Related: Nokia C5-03; Nokia 5230; Nokia 5233; Nokia 5530 XpressMusic; Nokia N97
- Compatible networks: GSM, EGPRS, WCDMA, HSDPA, A-GPS
- Form factor: Candybar
- Dimensions: 111×51.7×15.5 mm (4.37×2.04×0.61 in)
- Weight: 109 g (4 oz)
- Operating system: Symbian OS 9.4 (Firmware Version V60.0.003)
- CPU: ARM11 @ 434 Mhz after firmware V20
- Memory: 128 MB SDRAM, 256 MB NAND, 81 MB Internal User Storage
- Removable storage: max. 16 GB microSDHC (32 GB unofficial), 8 GB card included
- Battery: BL-5J (3.7V 1320mAh); 2 mm charging connector
- Rear camera: 3.2 Megapixels, Carl Zeiss AG optics with autofocus and dual LED flash
- Front camera: Front camera for video calls
- Display: nHD 640 x 360 pixels, 3.2-inch 16:9 widescreen, (16.7 million colours)
- Media: AAC, AAC+, eAAC+, MP3, MP4 (MPEG-4 Part 2 VGA / H.264 QVGA), M4A, WMA, AMR-NB, AMR-WB, Mobile XMF, SP-MIDI, MIDI Tones (poly 64), RealAudio 7,8,10, True tones, WAV, but not Ogg files.
- Connectivity: Bluetooth 2.0 (EDR/A2DP), WLAN (802.11 b/g), USB Micro B 2.0; 3.5 mm headphone and video-out jack
- Data inputs: Touchscreen with Nokia Dynamic Intelligent Layouts, proximity sensor, accelerometer

Nokia 5800 XpressMusic is a Symbian smartphone from Nokia as part of the XpressMusic line. It was unveiled on 2 October 2008 in London and started shipping in November of that year, marking the company's first mainstream phone with a touchscreen. The Nokia 5800 was the first device to run S60 5th Edition (later referred to as Symbian^1), designed as a touch-specific version of the S60 platform which was otherwise originally built for use using a traditional D-pad and keypad.

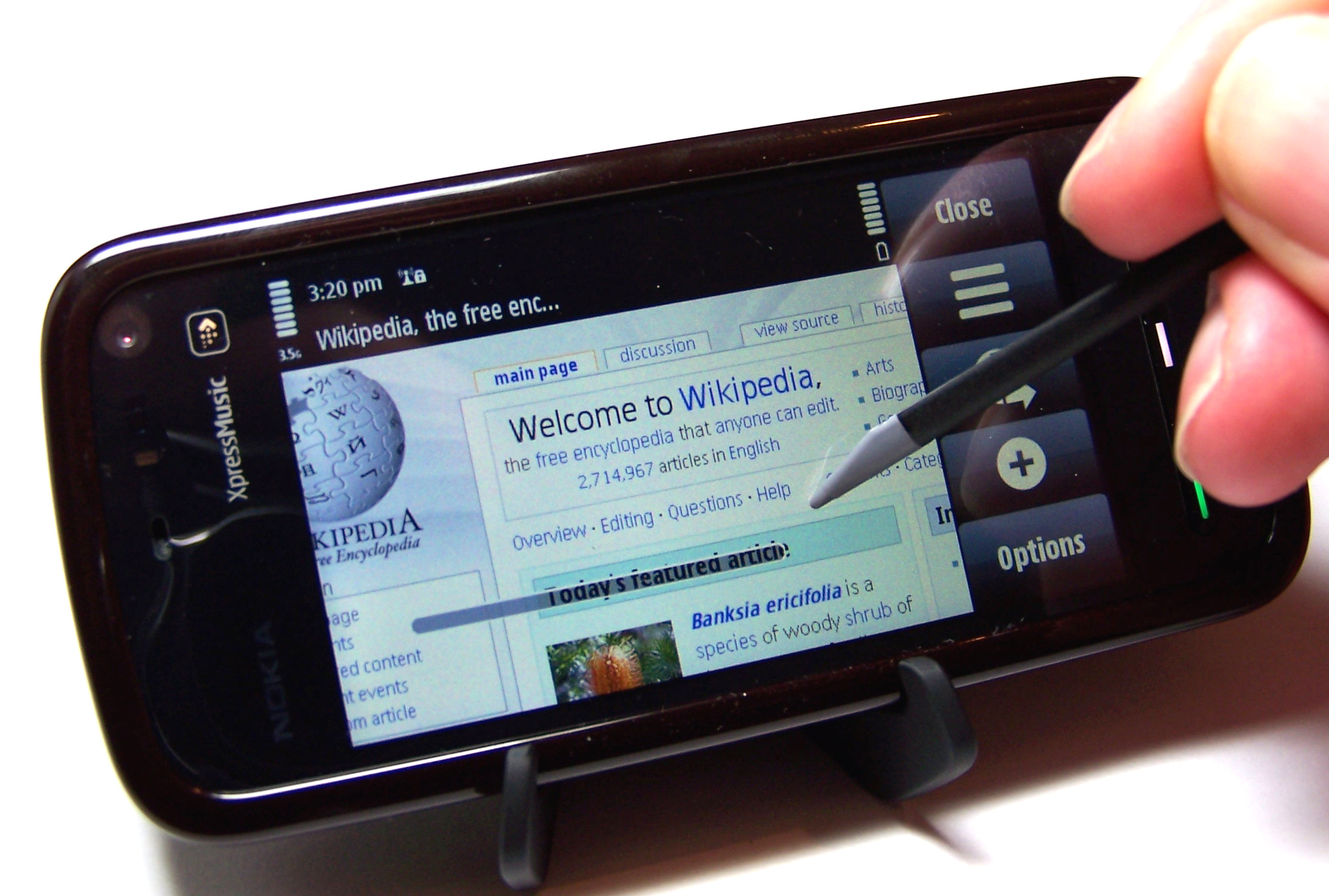
Nokia 5800 XpressMusic on stand, and stylus

Positioned as a mid-range offering, Nokia 5800 XpressMusic has a 3.2-inch display with a resolution of 640x360 pixels. The 16:9 aspect ratio display was the first among mobile phones. The resistive touchscreen features tactile feedback, though it does not use Nokia's Haptikos technology. While rich in multimedia, it also had many features standard to the flagship Nokia Nseries, such as GPS, HSDPA and Wi-Fi support. The S60 5th Edition interface has a compatibility mode for S60 3rd Edition software as well as Java applications, that are not touchscreen-aware, using virtual keys on-screen.

Code-named "Tube", it was a highly anticipated device in 2008 and went on to become a commercial success with 8 million units sold a year after release, becoming the firm's first major smartphone hit in almost two years since the Nokia N95 debuted. The Nokia 5800 was praised for its supplied stylus and affordability, but was viewed negatively by critics for its camera and software issues. Nokia supported the 5800 with firmware updates until 2011.

== History ==
=== Nokia's touchscreens ===
The Nokia 5800 XpressMusic is not the first touchscreen device in Nokia's range of handsets. In 2004, the Nokia 7700 was announced, a Series 90 Symbian device that was cancelled before it reached the market. This was followed by the Nokia 7710 which was an upgraded version of the 7700 and became available during 2005. Nokia also produced the UIQ-based Nokia 6708 phone in 2005, but this was not an in-house development and was bought in from Taiwanese manufacturer BenQ, and it targeted the Chinese market. Nokia have also produced a range of Maemo-based tablets called the Nokia Internet tablet range, which have a touchscreen interface but are not mobile phones by themselves. The 5800 is, however, Nokia's first S60-based Symbian touchscreen device and hence their first mainstream touchscreen handset. Public interest in touchscreen mobile phones rose significantly in 2007 after Apple released the iPhone. Nokia's rivals LG and Samsung had both also launched consumer-oriented touchscreen handsets during this time.

=== Development and leaks ===
At Nokia's Go Play event in London on 27 August 2007 — where the Nokia N81, N81 8GB, Nokia N95 8GB, Ovi, Nokia Music Store and N-Gage 2.0 were unveiled, — the company's CEO Olli-Pekka Kallasvuo also said that a touchscreen-operated smartphone based on the S60 platform will be launched in the following year. The event also showcased a touch-operated concept running S60 software. The device presented in the video was remarkably iPhone-like, which Engadget referred to as the "Nokia iPhone". It was later explained that the concept was regarding the touch software and not the hardware device mock-up.

At the Symbian Smartphone Show in October 2007, Nokia announced and showed an S60 touch interface, stating that it will be released in 2008. It was demoed during the 2008 Mobile World Congress. Many rumours started circling around regarding Nokia's first touchscreen S60 smartphone. On 8 April 2008, images of this device and running an early touch-based interface were leaked and soon a Nokia official confirmed that the company is working on such a device, codenamed "Tube". Nokia soon also bought out Symbian Software and made the operating system open source with its partners under the Symbian Foundation. This also led to S60 being adopted as the sole user interface and the discontinuation of UIQ.

The "Tube" was widely leaked and discussed about during the year. Notably a prototype of the Tube also appeared in The Dark Knight, released in cinemas in July 2008. The scene where this prototype appears was during the final scenes which were shot in Hong Kong in November 2007.

=== Unveiling, release, and issues ===
Nokia unveiled the "Tube" 5800 XpressMusic at the Remix event held at Koko in London on 2 October 2008. Alongside the handset, the company also announced the Comes With Music service and a number of stereo wireless Bluetooth headphones. The device began shipping on 27 November 2008 retailing for €279 before taxes and initially available in markets including Finland, Spain, Russia, India and Hong Kong. It launched in other territories in 2009, including in North America in March 2009. Nokia also expanded the Nokia Music Store availability globally to complement the release of the 5800.

In early February 2009 the website Mobile-Review.com, which was initially very enthusiastic about the handset, published its research and concluded that the Nokia 5800 had a design flaw. Specifically, when phones were used on a daily basis, their earpieces, produced for Nokia under contract by a third party, would cease to function in a very short time. Repairs performed under warranty would only temporarily fix the problem. The defect was found to be in the earpiece design. Nokia's public relations department had admitted that the Nokia 5800 XpressMusic contained this design defect. According to Nokia, they switched to another earpiece manufacturer, so all 5800's produced during February 2009 or later should be free from defect, with previously produced earpieces eligible for free warranty repair. New earpiece parts have also been supplied to Nokia service centres and future phone repairs should permanently fix the defect. Many early units also had faulty speakers. Nokia acknowledged this issue in January 2009.

=== Marketing and media appearances ===
A prototype of the Nokia 5800 was seen in the 2008 Batman movie, The Dark Knight, where it was operated by Morgan Freeman. The Nokia 5800 has also appeared in a number of music videos such as Christina Aguilera's "Keeps Gettin' Better", "Womanizer" by Britney Spears, Flo Rida's "Right Round", Pitbull's "Shut It Down", The Pussycat Dolls' "Jai Ho!" and "Hush Hush", Katy Perry's "Waking Up in Vegas" and Cobra Starship's "Good Girls Go Bad".

=== Navigation Edition ===
On 21 August 2009, Nokia announced a new variant named Nokia 5800 Navigation Edition. In addition to the normal Nokia 5800, it had the then-latest version of Nokia Maps/Ovi Maps pre-installed. It also comes with a car charger and car kit inside the box because the GPS decreases the battery life. Both the Nokia 5800 XpressMusic and the 5800 Navigation Edition, however, have free lifetime navigation, due to the new version of Ovi Maps.

== Reception ==
The Nokia 5800 XpressMusic's low price, about half that of rival touchscreen phones, was praised. Mobile-Review.com stated that the 5800's price included not just the handset but a subscription to the Comes With Music service, allowing music downloading from the Nokia Music Store for 12 months. It cited that this potentially made Nokia a big winner against Apple (iPhone 3G, iPod Touch and iTunes Store), Sony Ericsson (Walkman series) and various manufacturers of portable media players that feature video playback but retail for high prices. On the market, the Nokia 5800 XpressMusic would compete with other touchscreen devices such as Sony Ericsson Xperia X1, Sony Ericsson Satio, iPhone 3G, HTC Touch Diamond, LG Renoir, LG Arena (KM900), BlackBerry Storm 9500, Samsung Pixon and Samsung i900 Omnia.

=== Sales ===
On 23 January 2009, Nokia announced it had shipped the millionth 5800 XpressMusic device, even though it still had not been fully released worldwide. Noknok reported by April that it was one of the fastest selling smartphones of all time. In Nokia's Q1 report released on 16 April 2009 it was announced the company had shipped 2.6 million units during the quarter, with cumulative shipments of more than 3 million units since the smartphone's launch. Q2 results released 16 July 2009 reports 3.7 million units shipped during the quarter and more than 6.8 million units total have shipped since the release. As of November 2009, over 8 million units had been sold.

Nokia's Olli-Pekka Kallasvuo estimated in April 2009 that as much as 20 percent of touchscreen devices sold worldwide were 5800s and said it has the potential to become one of the company's most successful devices. Its low price had been cited as a factor in its popularity coming at a time of a "cheap chic" trend of affordable but attractive touchscreen mobile phones on the market, and during the peak of the Great Recession.

=== Reviews ===
The phone has received generally positive reviews, with UK phone magazine Mobile Choice awarding it a full 5 stars in its 7 January 2009 issue. There were however critics who found the new S60 touch interface clunky and slow. TechRadar called its touch interface a "practical evolution rather than jaw-dropping revolution". It wrote that while it is not as smooth as the iPhone's interface, it is still functional and gave praise to the 5800's functionalities within.

=== Legacy ===
The launch of the 5800 XpressMusic was followed-up with the release of the flagship touchscreen Nokia N97 in May and June 2009, as well as the Series 40 touchscreen Nokia 6208c for the Chinese market in January 2009. Building on the 5800 XpressMusic, the company released in 2009 new offerings for even cheaper prices than the 5800, namely the Nokia 5530 XpressMusic and Nokia 5230. Samsung i8910 Omnia HD and Sony Ericsson Satio were also released by rival manufacturers using the new S60 5th Edition user interface.

The Nokia 5800 XpressMusic was succeeded as the company's premier music-oriented device by the Nokia X6, which also dropped the XpressMusic branding.

Despite the large success of the 5800 XpressMusic, the device has in retrospect been seen as the first misstep for Nokia that led to its decline as the leading mobile phone manufacturer. Nokia's Symbian team decided to build the touch interface for the 5800 on its existing S60 platform, which was not touch-optimised as it was originally designed with physical keypads in mind. On the contrary, Apple's iPhone OS and Google's Android, the latter of which first launched around the same time as Nokia's 5800, were built from the ground up for touchscreens, resulting in a more responsive user experience. This made Symbian^1's user interface quickly becoming dated in the face of competitors (as evident on the N97) as efforts to improve it proved difficult in the Symbian source code. Nokia's first flagship with the improved Symbian^3 OS and capacitive touchscreen (Nokia N8) did not ship until September 2010.

== Specifications ==
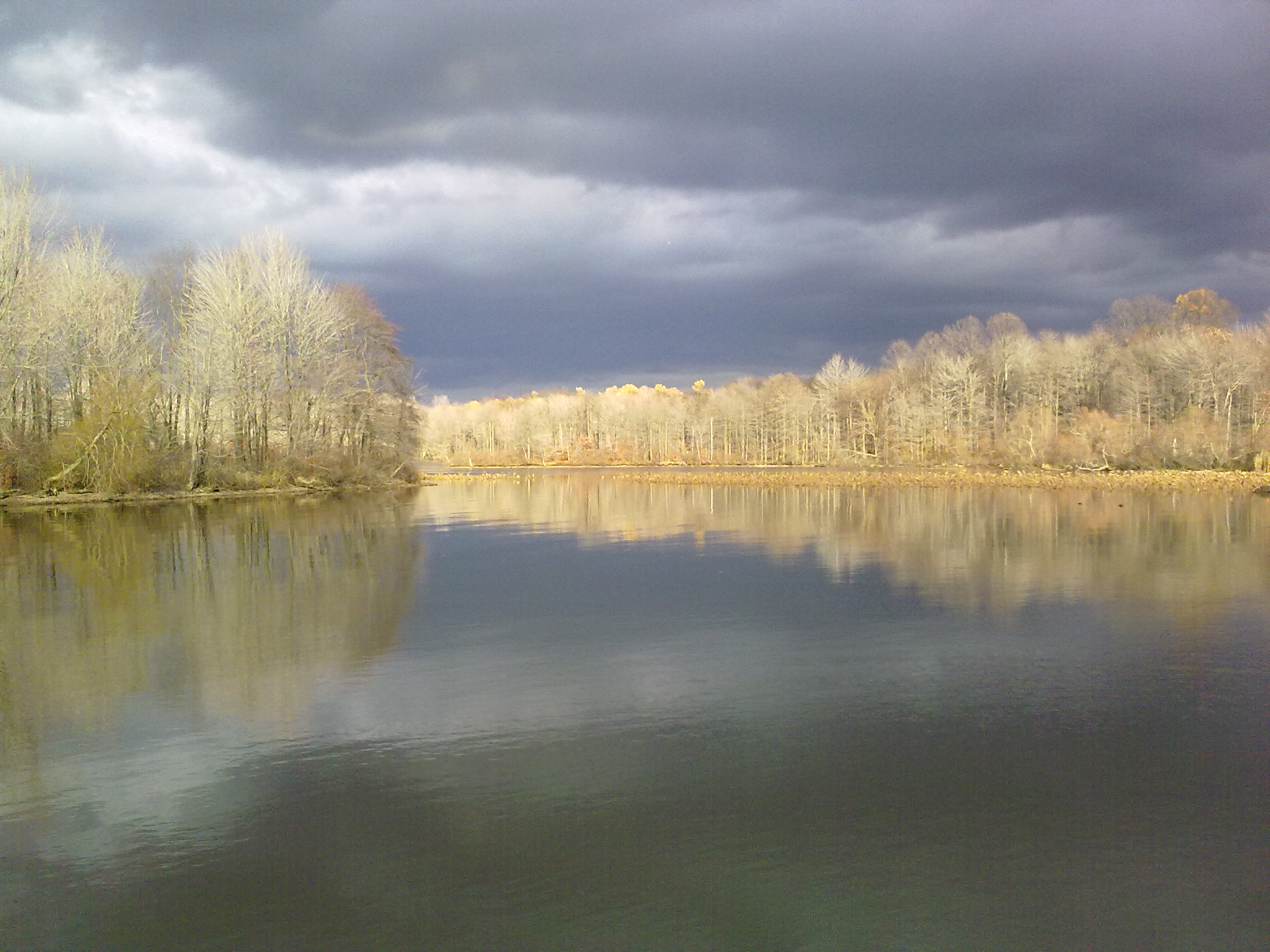
Sample photograph taken by the Nokia 5800 XpressMusic

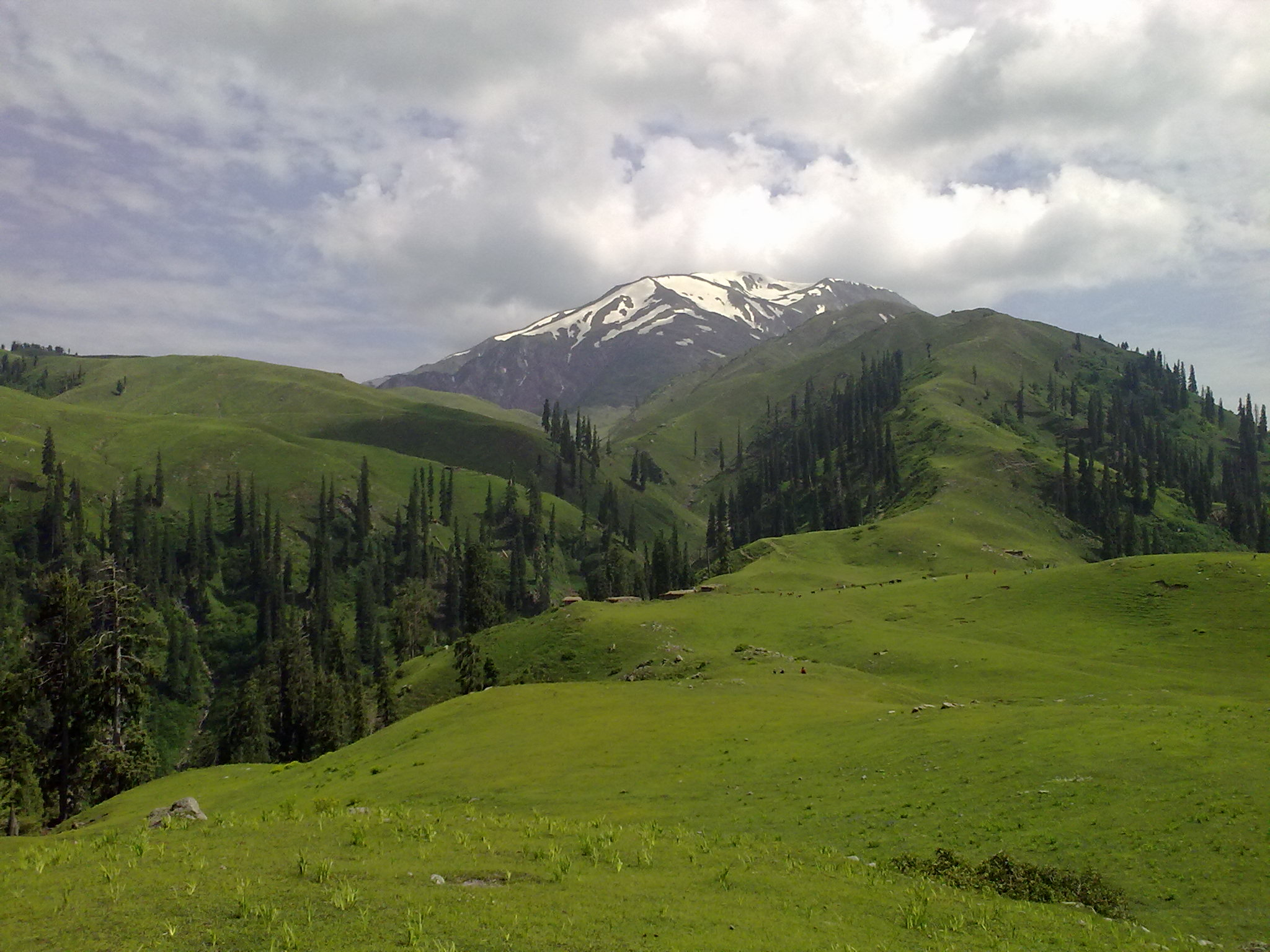
Sample photograph taken by the Nokia 5800 XpressMusic

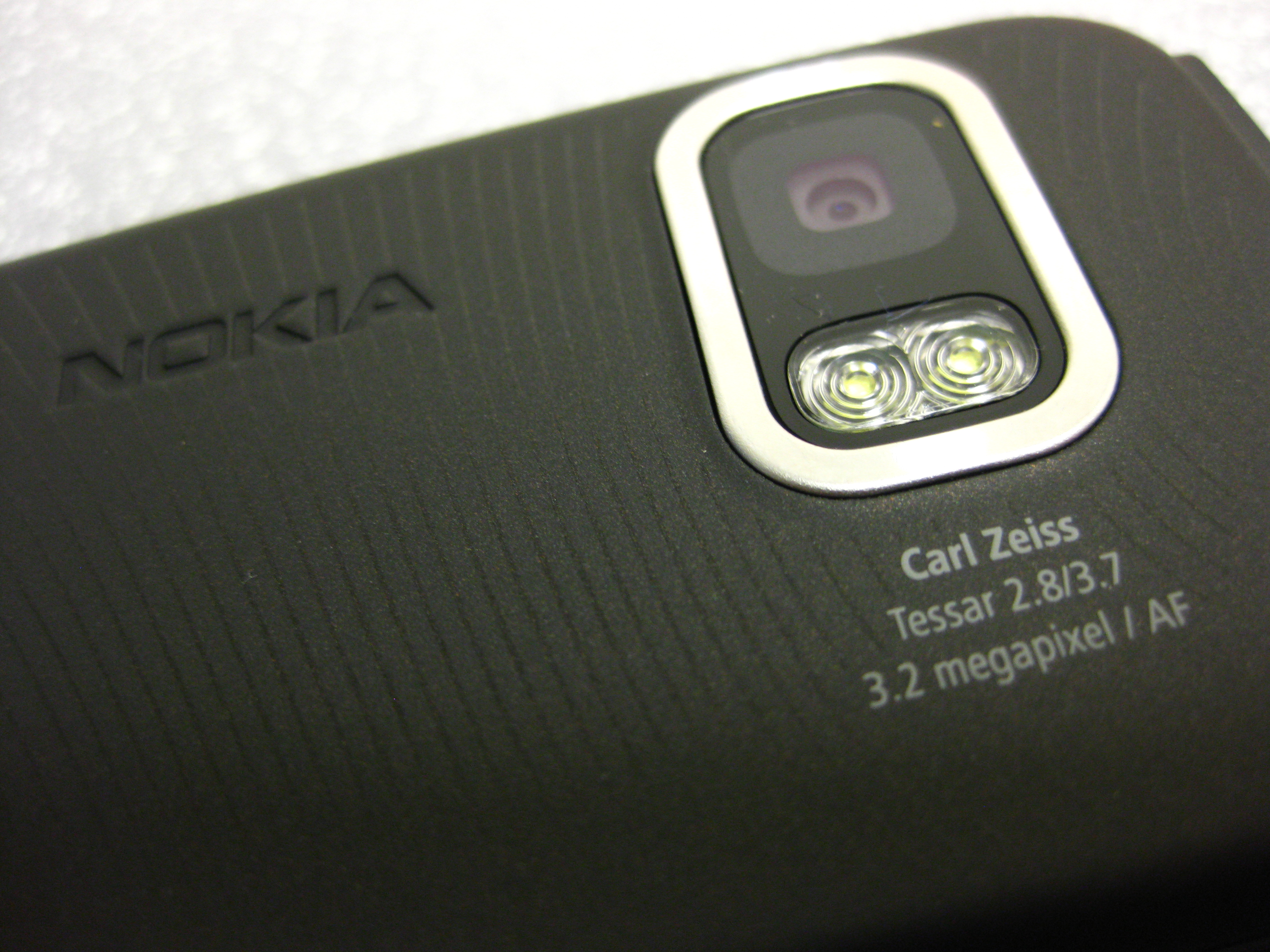
The 3.2 MP AF Carl Zeiss camera featuring dual LED flash

Nokia 5800 XpressMusic has the following specifications:

- 81-mm / 3.2-inch 16.7M TFT resistive touchscreen, 360 × 640 pixels resolution (16:9 display ratio).
- Dimensions: 111 × 51.7 × 15.5 mm, 83 cm^{3}
- Weight: 109 g (incl. battery and sim card).
- S60 5th edition OS with touch input running Symbian OS v9.4
- Quad band GSM / GPRS / EDGE: GSM 850 / 900 / 1800 / 1900
- Dual band UMTS / HSDPA: UMTS 900 / 2100 (5800–1) or UMTS 850 / 1900 (5800-2 Latin America and Brazil variant)
- Stand-by time – Up to 406 hrs
- Integrated hands-free speakerphone
- Vibrating alert
- Accelerometer for auto screen rotation.
- 3.2 MP AF Carl Zeiss lens, dual LED flash, 3x digital zoom and geotagging support.
- GPS with A-GPS function and Ovi Maps
- FM Radio 76.0–108 MHz with RDS (max. 20 stations).
- 3.5 mm headphone / video-out jack and Nokia video-out cable CA-75U.
- MicroSDHC card slot (up to 16 GB) and 8GB card included in box (unofficial support up to 32 GB)
- Micro-USB 2.0 connector, Bluetooth 2.0 (EDR/A2DP/AVRCP) and Wireless LAN.
- Colours available – Black, Blue & Red

=== Keys and input method ===
- Stylus, plectrum and finger touch support for text input and user interface control (alphanumeric keypad, full and mini qwerty keyboard, handwriting recognition)
- Dedicated Media Bar touch key for access to music, gallery, share on-line, Video Centre and web browser
- Voice commands
- Physical keys for application launch key (menu key), send & end, power, camera, lock, volume up & down, slide unlock.

== Software ==
The 5800 idle screen, featuring the newly redesigned S60 5th Edition, especially designed for touchscreens

- Symbian^1 (= S60 5th Edition) operating system, first version under the Symbian Foundation
- Built-in support for Flash Lite 3.1.
- Java ME MIDP 2.0 included.
- Read-only trial version of QuickOffice is available, allowing to read MS Office/OpenOffice.org files, also supporting the Office Open XML file format.
- Adobe Reader LE trial version
- Ovi Maps
- Other S60v5 (*.sis) and Java (*.jar) software.
- Pre-installed Bounce Touch and Global Race: Raging Thunder games

=== Firmware updates ===
Early firmware versions had noticeable drawbacks in the 5800's user interface. Software performance was improved over time through updates.

From firmware version 20.0.012 onwards, the 5800's CPU clock was increased from 369 MHz to 434 MHz, matching the N97 specification. However, improved overall performance can be observed since firmware version 30.

On 13 January 2010, Nokia released a major firmware update, version 40.0.005. The update includes bug fixes, speed improvements and new features. The most visible are kinetic scrolling to all menus (except the main and applications menus) and an improved home screen that was first introduced on the Nokia 5530. This software update also saw the removal of alphanumeric keypad in landscape view during text input, which was replaced by a full QWERTY keyboard. The new home screen provides a contacts carousel, with up to 20 contacts and program shortcuts on screen at the same time. There is a change on option selecting in every menus, but hard to notice; if one selects and holds on that selection, it will be in white, but normal colours when selecting an option is still being red like in v20.

On 19 April 2010, firmware version 50.0.005 was released. This new major update brought some new features available in Nokia N97, such as an upgrade to the existing web browser to version 7.2 and full kinetic scrolling and auto-full screen while browsing the web; a new music player with mini-album art in the song list and the album list, initial letter filtering of track titles in the music player while scrolling using the scroll-bar. As a result, the search function was removed from the music player. A new application called Ovi Sync was installed and the Nokia Music Store received a revamped user interface and was renamed to "Ovi Music". In some regions, Quick Office 4.2.374 is integrated with full free license. Search application's icon was changed and a few more minor updates for better touch sensitivity and tweaks for faster operation of the phone are present. And a little update to the color, the option you select is in silver, but when hold an option, it is still being white like v40. There is also the new feature, one-touch dialling.

Firmware 51.0.006 appeared in August 2010 and contained minor bug fixes and updates to various applications. RDS function, however, remains dysfunctional since version 40.0.005. The web browser has lost its ability to re-flow the text when the page is enlarged.

Firmware 51.2.007 was also released for North American Nokia 5800 RM-428 in August 2010 with the following changes: This software release comes with an improved browser, improved video calls, and a new version of Mail for Exchange. There are also general performance improvements.

- Improved Mail for Exchange
- Improved video calls
- Improved browser
- Performance improvements

In November 2010, an updated firmware for Nokia 5800 was released for Nokia 5800 as V52.0.007. The firmware update expects

- Greater New Features
- Updated Application
- Performance improvements
- RDS function fix

There is still no "pencil" or "select several" ability in the gallery. A big disadvantage still exists as pictures and videos are listed in one gallery and there are no separate galleries for pictures and videos.

On 20 October 2011, firmware version 60.0.003 was released. This new major update brought the new Symbian Anna browser 7.3.1.33 and swipe to unlock feature.

== See also ==
- Mobile Java
- Nokia PC Suite
- Nokia Software Updater
- Qt (framework)
- RealPlayer
- Text-to-speech
- Wireless personal area network (WPAN)
