= Nokia 5320 XpressMusic =

2008 cell phone model

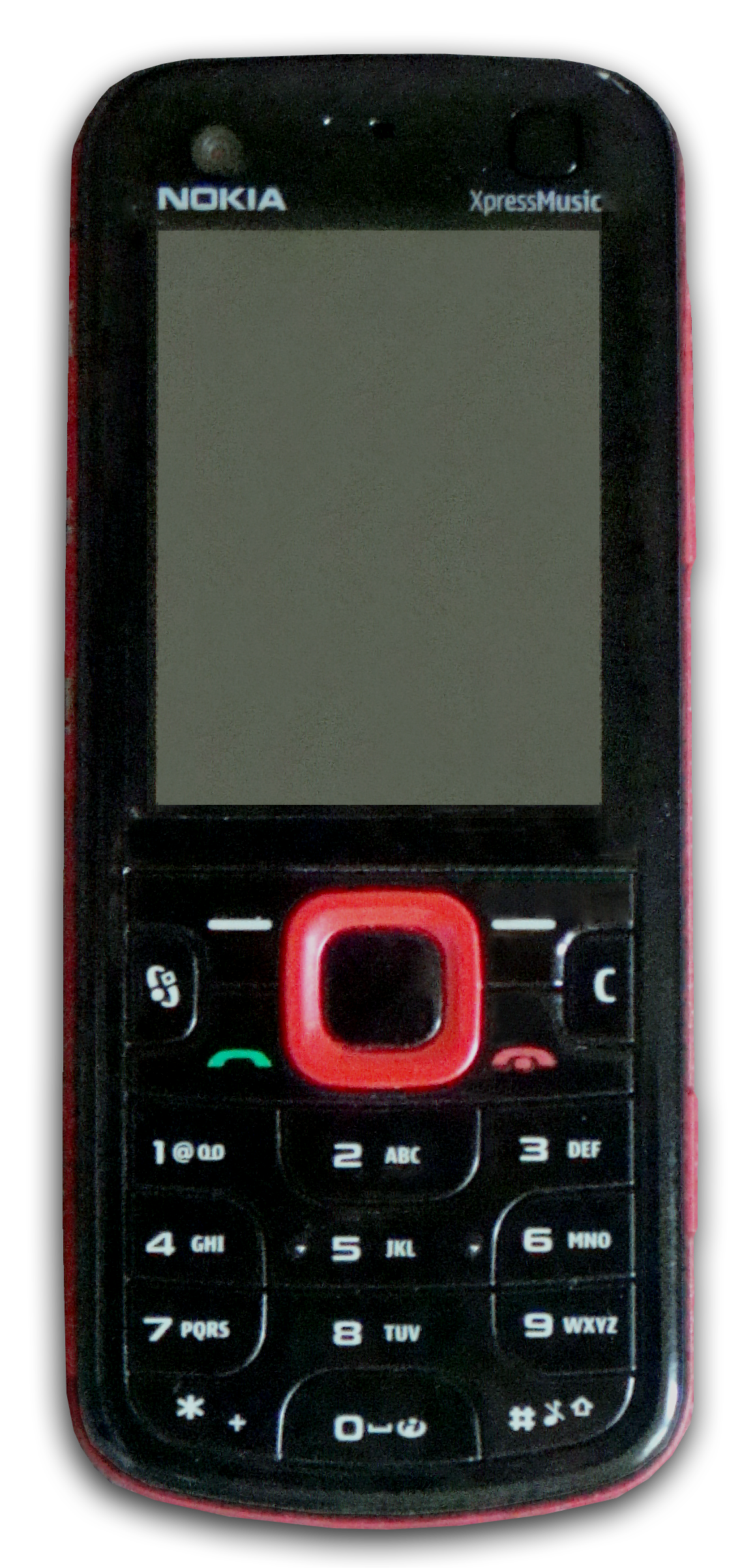
- Manufacturer: Nokia
- Series: XpressMusic
- Predecessor: Nokia 5700 XpressMusic; Nokia 5310
- Successor: Nokia 5630 XpressMusic; Nokia 5730 XpressMusic
- Related: Nokia 6120 classic
- Compatible networks: GSM, EGPRS, WCDMA, HSDPA
- Form factor: Candybar
- Dimensions: 108×46×15 mm (4.25×1.81×0.59 in)
- Weight: 90 g (3 oz)
- Operating system: Symbian OS 9.3 + S60 platform 3rd Edition, Feature Pack 2
- CPU: ARM11 @ 369 Mhz
- Memory: 150 MB storage, 128 MB RAM
- Removable storage: max. 32 GB microSDHC, 512 MB-1 GB microSD card included
- Battery: BL-5B (3.7V 890mAh)
- Rear camera: 2 Megapixels with LED flash
- Front camera: Front VGA camera for video calls
- Display: QVGA 240x320, 16 million colors
- Connectivity: Bluetooth 2.0 (EDR/A2DP), MicroUSB 2.0; 3.5 mm headphone jack
- Data inputs: Keypad

The Nokia 5320 XpressMusic is a Symbian OS S60 mobile phone, released by Nokia in 2008 as a part of their XpressMusic line of portable devices. The phone has a rugged candybar body with outlined keypads. It emphasizes music and multimedia playback. Among its highlights are a dedicated 3D audio chip for better sound quality, 24 hours of music playback, a 3.5 mm audio jack, N-Gage compatibility, and music/gaming keys. At the time of release the phone cost $220 in the U.S., European and Asian markets.

Its capabilities include: a 2-megapixel digital camera with flash, video recording and video conferencing; wireless connectivity via HSDPA, and Bluetooth; a portable media player with the ability to download podcasts over the air; an FM radio tuner; multitasking to allow several applications to run simultaneously; a web browser with support for HTML, JavaScript and Adobe Flash; messaging via SMS, MMS and e-mail; Office suite and organizer functions; and the ability to install and run third-party Java ME or Symbian mobile applications.
