= Nokia 3-digit series =

Series of mobile phones

The Nokia 3-digit series are a series of feature and smartphones by HMD Global and previously by Microsoft Mobile and Nokia, generally aimed at developing markets.

== History ==
=== Under Nokia ===
Nokia originally launched the brand for low end devices aimed at developing markets but among the series' original operating systems was the primarily smartphone-aimed operating system, Symbian which was discontinued in October 2011. And after the depreciation of Symbian Nokia started to exclusively use S30 and S40 as their feature phone platforms.

=== Under Microsoft ===
Microsoft completed its acquisition of Nokia's devices and services divisions in 2014 after which they continued developing and selling Nokia's feature phone range but decided to discontinue S30 and S40 in favour of S30+. With the release of newer devices Microsoft started to add their services such as Bing, MSN Weather, and GroupMe to the operating system. In June 2016, Microsoft sold the series as part of its feature phone sale to HMD Global.

=== Under HMD Global ===
HMD Global completed the acquisition from Microsoft and started manufacturing Nokia-branded phones in late 2016. Since 2019, most devices made by HMD run the new Series 30+ based on UNISOC's Mocor OS platform, such as the Nokia 220 4G. Also, the Nokia 800 Tough was the only Nokia 3-digit series phone to run KaiOS.

== List of devices ==
=== Phones running Nokia Series 30 under Nokia ===
- Nokia 100
- Nokia 101
- Nokia 103
- Nokia 105
- Nokia 106
- Nokia 107

=== Phones running Nokia Series 30+ ===
Under Nokia

- Nokia 108
- Nokia 220
- Nokia 225

Under Microsoft

- Nokia 105 (2015)
- Nokia 130
- Nokia 215
- Nokia 216 (some models branded as HMD)
- Nokia 222
- Nokia 225
- Nokia 230

Under HMD Global

- Nokia 105 (2017)
- Nokia 105 (2019)
- Nokia 105 (2022)
- Nokia 105 Plus (2022)
- Nokia 105 (2023)
- Nokia 106 (2018)
- Nokia 106 (2023)
- Nokia 110 (2019)
- Nokia 110 (2022)
- Nokia 110 (2023)
- Nokia 125
- Nokia 125 (2023)
- Nokia 130 (2017)
- Nokia 130 Music
- Nokia 150
- Nokia 150 (2020)
- Nokia 210 (2019)
- Nokia 230 (2024)
- Nokia 105 4G (2021)
- Nokia 105 4G (2023)
- Nokia 105 Pro 4G (2023)
- Nokia 106 4G (2023)
- Nokia 110 4G (2023)
- Nokia 110 Pro 4G (2023)
- Nokia 215 4G
- Nokia 220 4G
- Nokia 225 4G
- Nokia 215/220 4G (2024)
- Nokia 225 4G (2024)
- Nokia 235 4G

=== Phones running KaiOS under HMD Global ===
- Nokia 800 Tough

=== Phones running Nokia Series 40 under Nokia ===
- Nokia 109
- Nokia 110
- Nokia 111
- Nokia 112
- Nokia 113
- Nokia 114
- Nokia 206
- Nokia 207
- Nokia 208
- Nokia 301
- Nokia 515

=== Phones running Symbian under Nokia ===
- Nokia 500
- Nokia 600 (Cancelled)
- Nokia 603
- Nokia 700
- Nokia 701
- Nokia 808 PureView

== See also ==
- List of Nokia products
- Microsoft hardware
- Microsoft Lumia
- History of mobile phones
