= Nokia 222 =

Nokia-branded phone

Nokia 222 / Nokia 222 Dual SIM
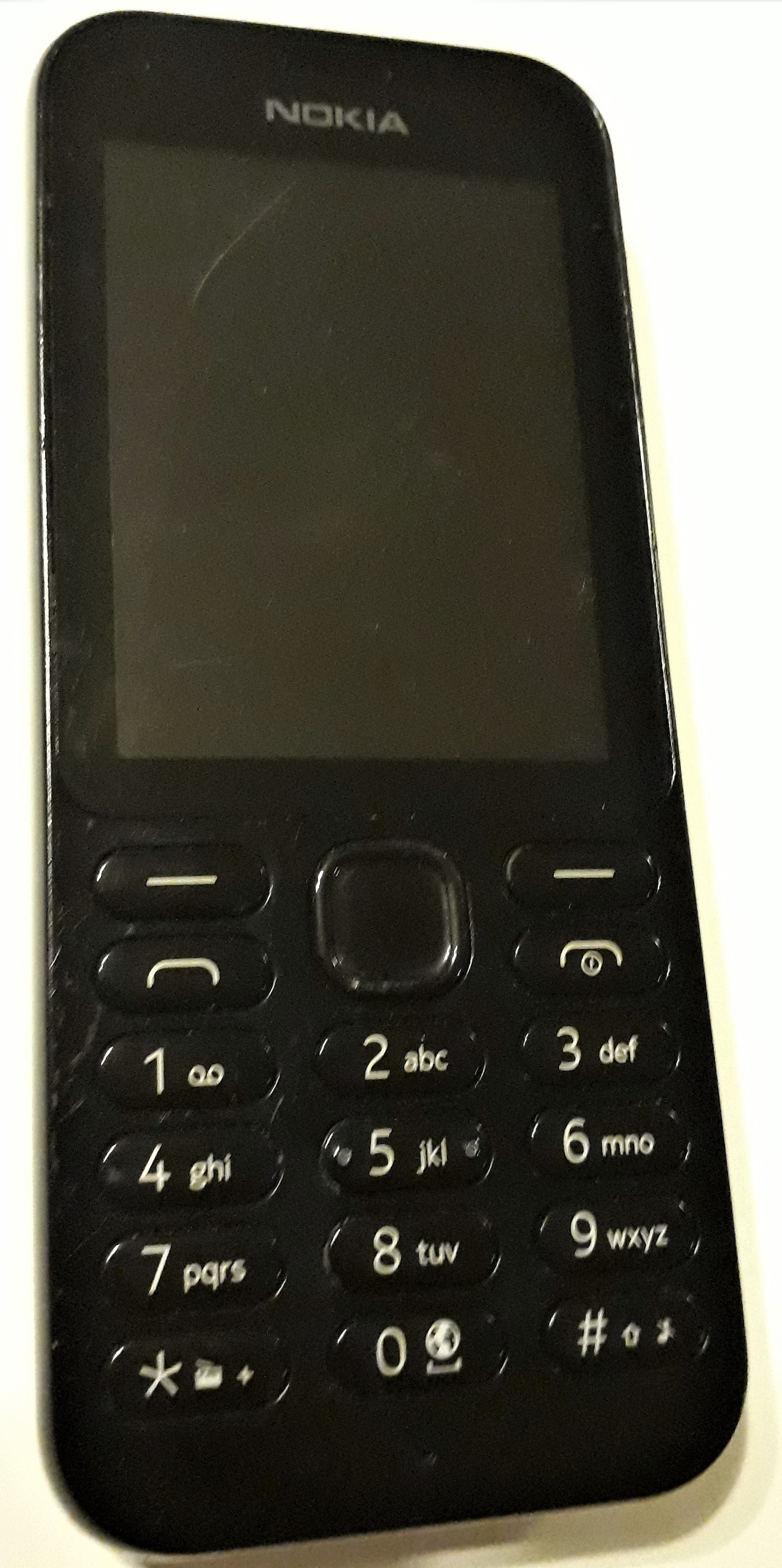
- Brand: Nokia
- Developer: HMD Global (formerly Microsoft Mobile)
- Manufacturer: Foxconn (formerly Microsoft Mobile)
- Series: Nokia 3-digit series
- Predecessor: Nokia 215
- Successor: Nokia 230
- Compatible networks: GSM (900/1800 MHz); GPRS and EDGE
- Form factor: Candybar
- Dimensions: 116×50×12.9 mm (4.57×1.97×0.51 in)
- Weight: 79 g (2.8 oz)
- Operating system: Series 30+
- Memory: 16 MB RAM
- Removable storage: Up to MicroSD 32 GB
- Battery: 1100 mAh
- Rear camera: 2.0 MP camera, fixed focus, 2x digital zoom
- Front camera: None
- Display: 262K color, 320 x 240, LCD transmissive
- Data inputs: Numeric keypad

The Nokia 222 and Nokia 222 Dual SIM are Nokia-branded dual-band GSM candybar-type phones, originally developed by Microsoft Mobile. The phones were originally released in the third quarter of 2015, in the Middle East, Africa, Asia, and Europe. Then, were sold again by HMD Global. They are available in black and white.

== Specifications ==
Nokia 222 has a 2.0 MP camera, speakerphone, multimedia playback, MMS messaging, Opera Mini web browser and e-mail client. It also has Facebook and Twitter apps, as well as the Microsoft's features services such as built in Bing Search and MSN Weather. The Skype GroupMe chat is the new function of this new phone. The phone is also able to download other apps and games using the pre-installed mobile apps store. Battery talk time is up to 20 hours. Stand by time is 29 days for the single-SIM and 21 days for the dual-SIM. Its dimensions are 116 x 50 x 12.9 mm, and the weight is 79 g. It uses 2G network infrastructure, and is activated through mini-SIM. The phone allows up to 1000 contacts to be stored in its address book. Like all Series 30+ phones, it can only store one number per address book entry. Nokia 222 has the Micro-USB adapter and it can SLAM share with free games.

== See also ==
- Nokia 3-digit series
- Nokia 215
- Nokia 220
