= Nokia 105 4G =

2021 Nokia feature smartphone

- Brand: Nokia
- Developer: HMD Global
- Type: Feature phone
- First released: June 15, 2021
- Predecessor: Nokia 105 (2019)
- Successor: Nokia 105 4G (2023)
- Related: Nokia 110 4G
- Compatible networks: GSM, HSPA, LTE (4G)
- Form factor: Bar
- Dimensions: 121 mm (4.8 in) H 50 mm (2.0 in) W 14.5 mm (0.57 in) D
- Weight: 80.2 g (2.83 oz)
- Operating system: Series 30+
- CPU: Unisoc T107
- Memory: 128 MB RAM
- Storage: 48 MB
- Removable storage: No (2021 model)
- Battery: 1020 mAh Li-ion (removable)
- Charging: Micro-USB 2.0
- Display: 1.8 in (46 mm) TFT LCD, 65K colors 120 x 160 pixels, 4:3 ratio (~111 ppi density)
- Sound: Loudspeaker, 3.5 mm jack
- Model: TA-1381, TA-1378, TA-1385, TA-1375

The Nokia 105 4G (2021) is a feature phone that was branded by Nokia and manufactured by HMD Global. It was released on June 15, 2021 and was succeeded by the 2023 model.

In China, it was launched on June 29, 2021, with Alipay. It comes with wired or wireless FM radio support and VoLTE support.
