= Nokia 130 (2023) =

2023 feature phone

- Also sold as: Nokia 130 Music
- Brand: Nokia
- Manufacturer: HMD Global
- Type: Feature phone
- Series: Nokia 100 series
- First released: August 10, 2023
- Availability by region: August 10, 2023
- Predecessor: Nokia 130 (2017)
- Successor: Nokia 130 Music
- Related: Nokia 150 (2023)
- Compatible networks: GSM (900 / 1800)
- Form factor: Bar
- Colors: Dark Blue, Purple, Light Gold
- Dimensions: 130.9 mm (5.15 in) H 50.6 mm (1.99 in) W 14 mm (0.55 in) D
- Weight: 98.2 g (3.46 oz)
- Operating system: Nokia S30+
- Memory: 4 MB RAM
- Storage: 4 MB internal
- Removable storage: microSDHC
- Battery: 1,450 mAh Li-Ion (removable)
- Rear camera: No
- Display: 2.4 in (61 mm) TFT LCD, 65K colors 240 x 320 pixels, 4:3 ratio (~167 ppi)
- Sound: Loudspeaker, FM radio (built-in antenna), MP3 player
- Connectivity: Micro-USB 1.1, 3.5mm audio jack
- Other: Flashlight, Dual SIM (Mini-SIM), IP52 water resistance
- Website: https://www.hmd.com/en_int/nokia-130-2023/specs?sku=286838521

The Nokia 130 (2023), also sold in other markets as the Nokia 130 Music, is a feature phone that was manufactued, branded and designed by HMD Global under the brand Nokia. It was unveiled in August 2023 in India, along with the Nokia 150.

== Features ==
The Nokia 130 features a 2.4-inch TFT display, a 4-megabyte internal storage and RAM, an expandable storage via microSDHC, an IP52 splash/dust resistance, and a 1450 mAh removable battery providing 30 days of stand-by and a talk time of 20 hours. The 130 runs on Nokia's Series 30+.
