= Nokia 215 =

2015 cell phone model

Nokia 215 / Nokia 215 Dual SIM
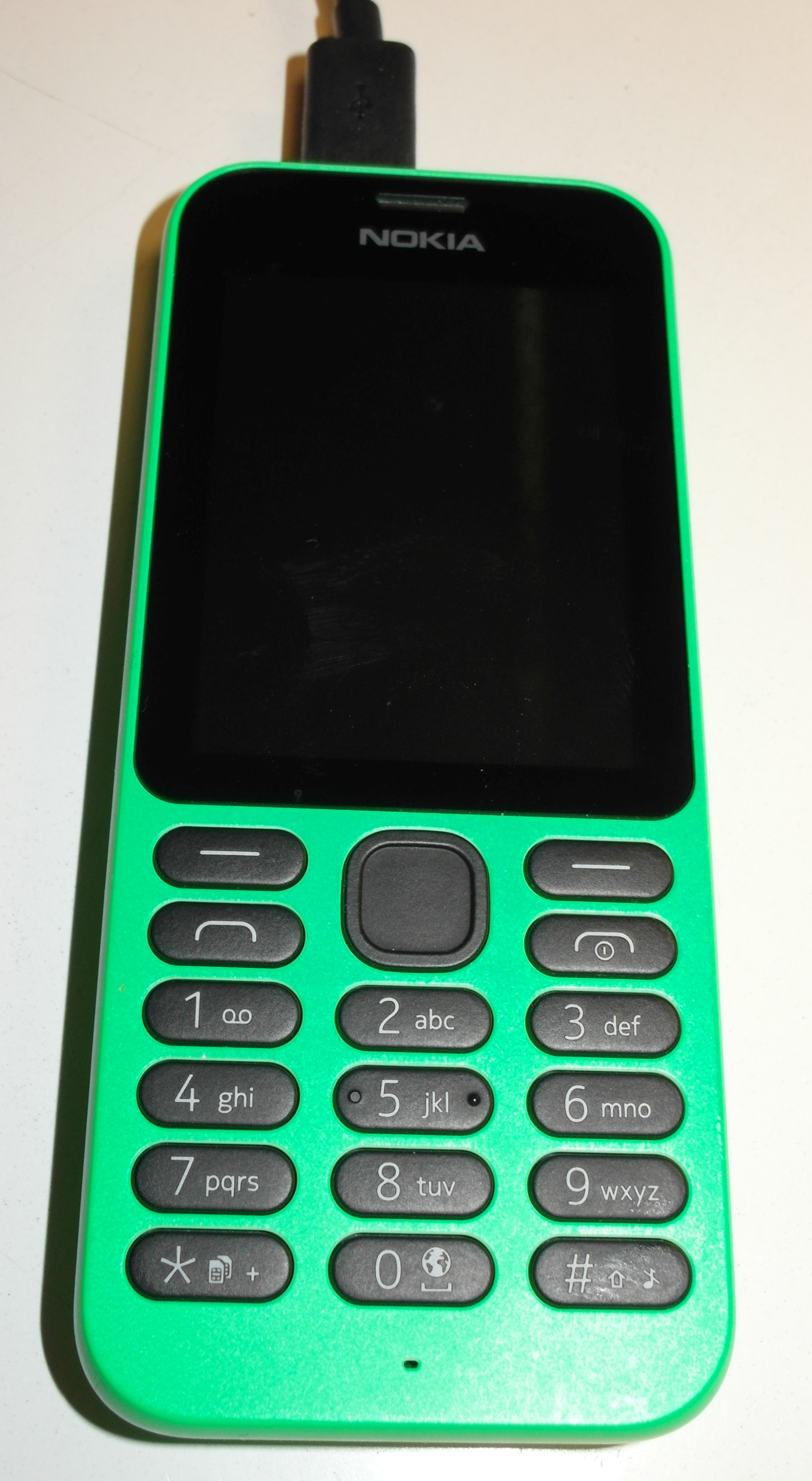
- Nokia 215 in bright green
- Brand: Nokia
- Developer: Microsoft Mobile
- Manufacturer: Microsoft Mobile
- Type: Feature phone
- Series: Nokia 3-digit series
- Predecessor: Nokia 130
- Successor: Nokia 216; Nokia 215 4G
- Compatible networks: GSM (900/1800 MHz) and GPRS
- Form factor: Candybar
- Colors: Black, White, Bright Green
- Dimensions: H: 116 mm (4.6 in); W: 50 mm (2.0 in); D: 12.9 mm (0.51 in)
- Weight: 78.4 g (2.77 oz)
- Operating system: Nokia Series 30+
- Memory: 8 MB RAM
- Removable storage: microSD, up to 32 GB
- Battery: 1100 mAh Li-ion, removable
- Rear camera: VGA camera, fixed focus, 2x digital zoom Video: 240p@15fps
- Front camera: None
- Display: 2.4 in (61 mm) 240 x 320 (~166 ppi pixel density) QVGA TFT with 256K colors
- Connectivity: 3.5 mm headphone jack; Bluetooth 3.0; FM radio, Stereo; micro USB 2.0
- Data inputs: Numeric keypad
- Other: Flashlight LED (on top); Opera Mini (Wap 2.0, XHTML)

The Nokia 215 and Nokia 215 Dual SIM are Nokia-branded dual-band GSM feature phones by Microsoft Mobile. The phones were released in the first quarter of 2015, in Africa, Asia, and Europe. They are available in black, white, and bright green.

== Specifications ==
The Nokia 215 has a VGA camera, speakerphone, multimedia playback, MMS messaging, web browser and e-mail client. It also has pre-loaded Facebook and Twitter apps, as well as the Opera Mini web browser, and also features Microsoft services, such as built in Bing Search and MSN Weather.

The phone can download other apps and games using the pre-installed mobile apps store.

The Nokia 215 can offer a battery talk time of up to 20 hours and a standby time of up to 29 days. On the other hand, the Nokia 215 Dual SIM offers up to 20 hours of talk time and up to 21 days of standby time. Its dimensions are 116 x 50 x 12.9 mm, it uses 2G network infrastructure, and is activated through a mini-SIM. The phone allows up to 1000 contacts to be stored in its address book.

== See also ==
- Nokia 3-digit series
- Nokia 130
- Nokia 220
