= Nokia 130 =

2014 mobile phone developed by HMD Global

Nokia 130 / Nokia 130 Dual SIM
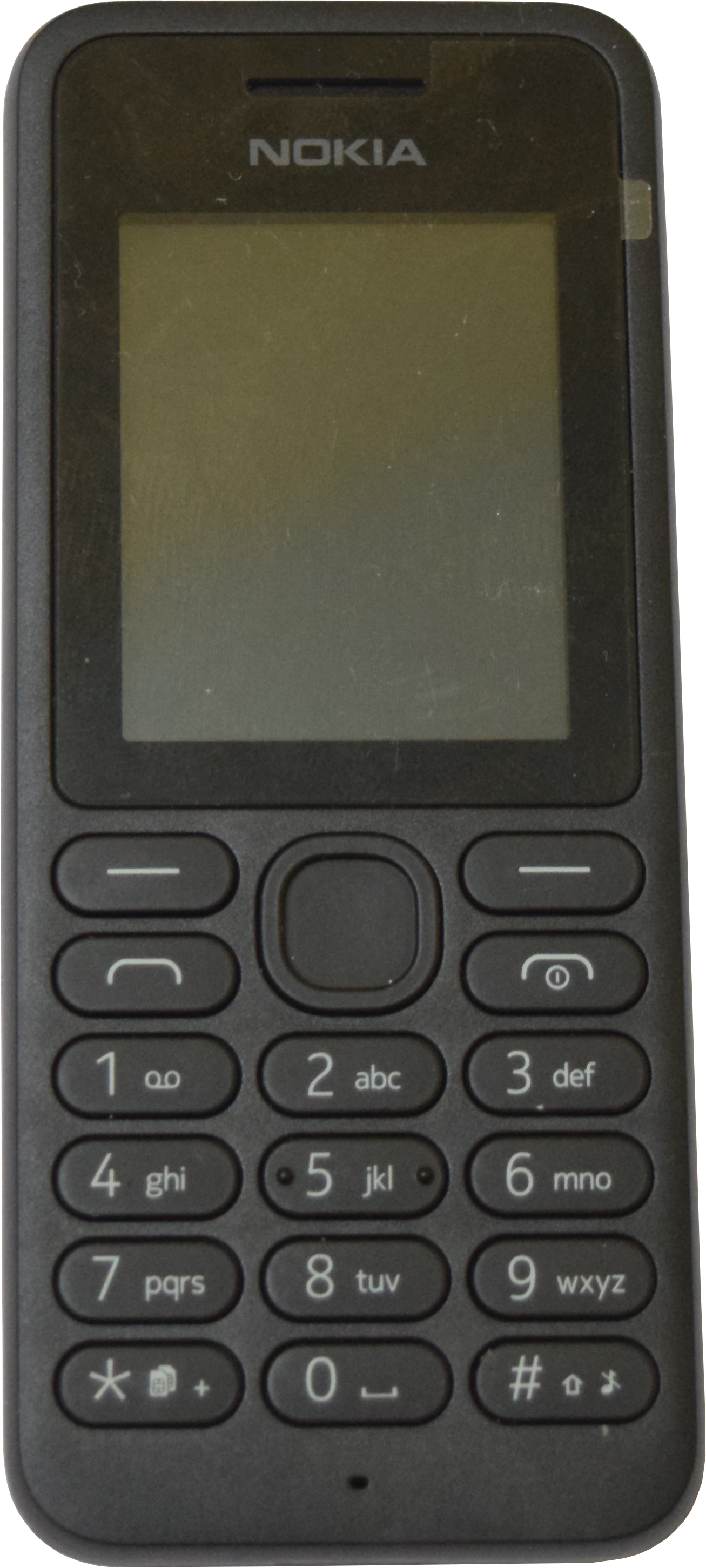
- Brand: Nokia
- Developer: HMD Global (formerly Microsoft Mobile)
- Manufacturer: Foxconn (formerly Microsoft Mobile)
- First released: September 2014
- Predecessor: Nokia 109
- Successor: Nokia 130 (2017); Nokia 150
- Related: Nokia 108
- Compatible networks: GSM 900 / 1800
- Form factor: Monoblock
- Dimensions: 106.0 mm (4.17 in); 45.5 mm (1.79 in); 13.9 mm (0.55 in)
- Weight: 67.9 g (2.40 oz)
- Operating system: Nokia Series 30+
- Removable storage: up to 32 GB microSDHC
- Battery: 1020 mAh Li-Ion (Nokia BL-5C); Micro-B USB charger
- Rear camera: None
- Front camera: None
- Display: 1.8" LCD, 128x160 pixels (114 ppi)
- Sound: 3.5mm AV jack, speaker
- Connectivity: USB 2.0 micro-B, Bluetooth 3.0, FM radio
- Data inputs: Keypad
- Other: Flashlight LED (on back)

Nokia 130 and Nokia 130 Dual SIM are Nokia-branded entry-level feature phones from HMD Global. Originally introduced in September 2014 by Microsoft Mobile, the 130 supports one Mini-SIM card and 130 Dual SIM supports two Mini-SIM cards. The cost will be equivalent of 19 Euros when bought unlocked and SIM-free. Its available colors are red, black, and white, depending on region and market.

The phones are targeted at emerging markets, and initially went on sale in China, Egypt, India, Indonesia, Kenya, Nigeria, Pakistan, Philippines, and Vietnam.

== Specifications ==
Nokia 130 runs on an updated Series 30+ UI. The phone comes pre-loaded with various apps, the Snake Xenzia game, and audio/video playback support. The audio player supports MP3, WAV, AAC files. The video player supports MP4 (H.263) files.

The Nokia 130 and 130 Dual both provide the user with very long use times:

- Standby time up to 864 hours (36 days) for Nokia 130, and 624 hours (26 days) for Nokia 130 Dual SIM
- Talk time up to 13 hours (0.54 days)
- Video playback time up to 16 hours (0.67 days)
- Music playback time up to 46 hours (1.92 days)

== 2017 version ==
In 2017, HMD Global released a new version of the Nokia 130, under the same name (see Nokia 130 (2017)). It is slightly larger (111.5 x 48.4 x 14.2 mm), has small optical design changes and features a built-in flashlight and camera.

== See also ==
- Nokia 3-digit series
- Nokia 100
- Nokia 101 (2011)
- Nokia 103
- Nokia 106
