= Nokia 110 Power =

Modern GSM feature phone

- Brand: Nokia
- Manufacturer: HMD Global
- Series: Nokia 100 series
- First released: February 10, 2026
- Availability by region: February 2026
- Compatible networks: GSM (900/1800 MHz)
- Colors: Blue, Grey, Purple
- Dimensions: 117.7 x 50 x 14.2 mm (4.63 x 1.97 x 0.56 in)
- Weight: 88 g (3.10 oz)
- Operating system: Series 30+
- Memory: 4 MB RAM
- Storage: 4 MB internal
- Removable storage: microSDHC (dedicated slot), up to 32 GB
- SIM: Dual SIM (Mini-SIM, dual stand-by)
- Battery: Li-Ion 1750 mAh, removable
- Rear camera: QVGA
- Display: 2.0 inches, TFT LCD; Resolution: 120 x 160 pixels, 4:3 ratio (~100 ppi density)
- Connectivity: Micro-USB 2.0, 3.5mm jack
- Website: https://www.hmd.com/en_int/nokia-110-power?sku=AHM2013AARBKF2B

The Nokia 110 Power is a feature phone developed by HMD Global under the brand Nokia. It was unveiled on February 10, 2026.

It was claimed that the battery life extended up to 15 and a half days with a capacity of 1750 mAh. Aside from that, it has a 3.5mm headphone jack, 32-gigabyte expandable storage via microSD, MP3 player, and a QGVA camera.
