= Nokia 105 (2017) =

Mobile phone model

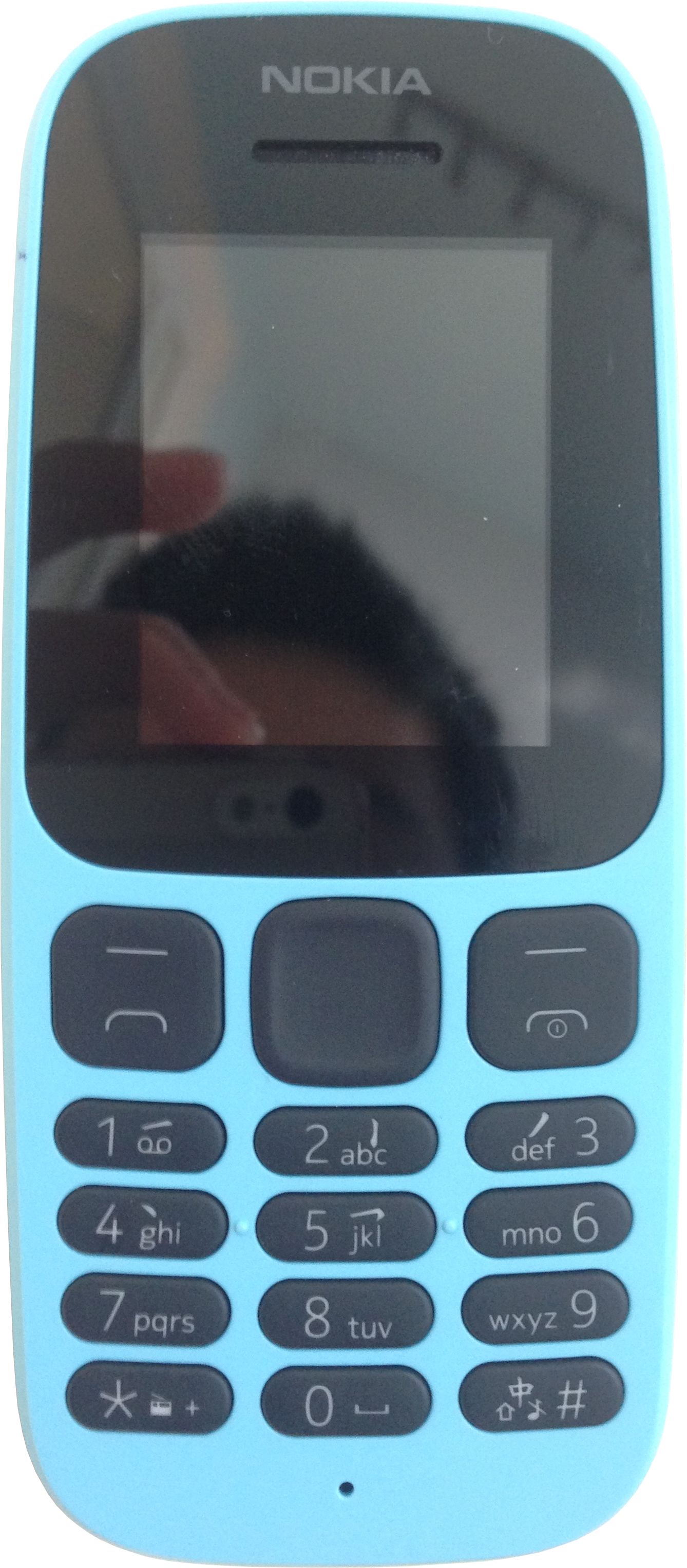
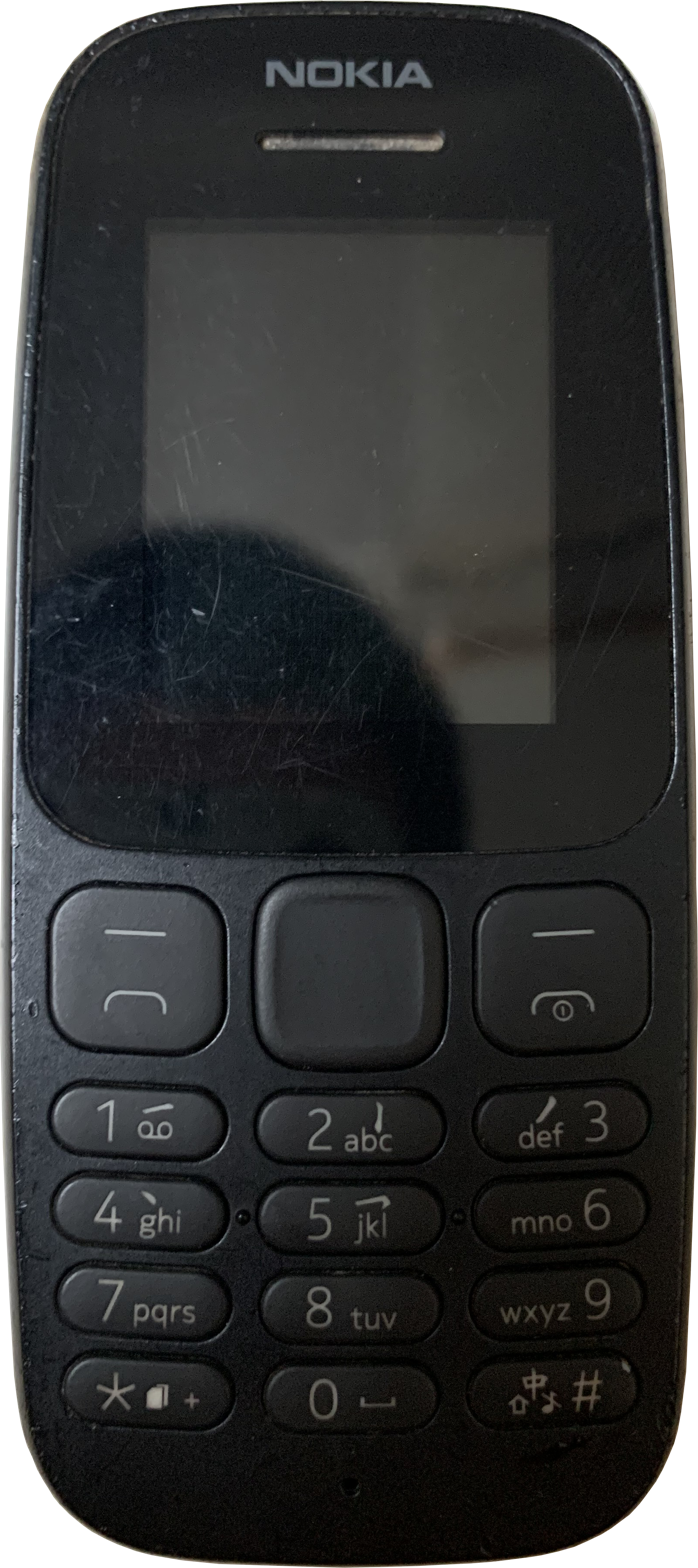
- Nokia 105 (2017) and Nokia 105 (2017) Dual SIM
- Brand: Nokia
- Developer: HMD Global
- Manufacturer: Foxconn
- Type: Feature phone
- Series: Nokia 3-digit series
- First released: July 17, 2017; 8 years ago
- Discontinued: Q2/Q3 2020
- Predecessor: Nokia 105 (2015)
- Successor: Nokia 105 (2019)
- Related: Nokia 105; Nokia 130 (2017)
- Form factor: Bar
- Dimensions: 112.0×49.5×14.4 mm (4.41×1.95×0.57 in)
- Weight: 73.0 g (2.57 oz)
- Operating system: Series 30+
- System-on-chip: MediaTek MT6261D
- Battery: 800 mAh
- Display: 1.8 inches (46 mm)

Nokia 105 (2017) is a Nokia-branded mobile phone developed by HMD Global. It was released on 17 July 2017 (alongside the Nokia 130 (2017)) and is available in black, white, and blue. It also has 3 games: Snake Xenzia, Doodle Jump, and Crossy Road. There are some other Nokia 105 units sold in certain regions that also have 3 more games: Ninja Up, Air Strike and Tetris.

The phone comes in both standard and Dual SIM editions. It operates on the GSM 900/1800 (EU) and GSM 850/1900 (US) networks. Being a 2G mobile, it has been mostly superseded by newer mobile devices that operate on the 3G/4G networks.
