= 3310 (disambiguation) =

The Nokia 3310 is a cellphone released in 2000 by Nokia Corporation.

3310 may refer to:

- A.D. 3310, a year in the 4th millennium CE
- 3310 BC, a year in the 4th millennium BCE
- 3310, a number in the 3000 (number) range

== Products ==
- Nokia 3310 (2017), a cellphone released in 2017
- IBM 3310, a harddisk drive for minicomputers

== Other uses ==
- 3310 Patsy, an asteroid in the Asteroid Belt
- Farm to Market Road 3310, a highway in Texas
