= Nokia 235 4G =

Nokia-branded mobile phone by HMD Global

Nokia 235 4G (2024) HMD 235 4G (2024)
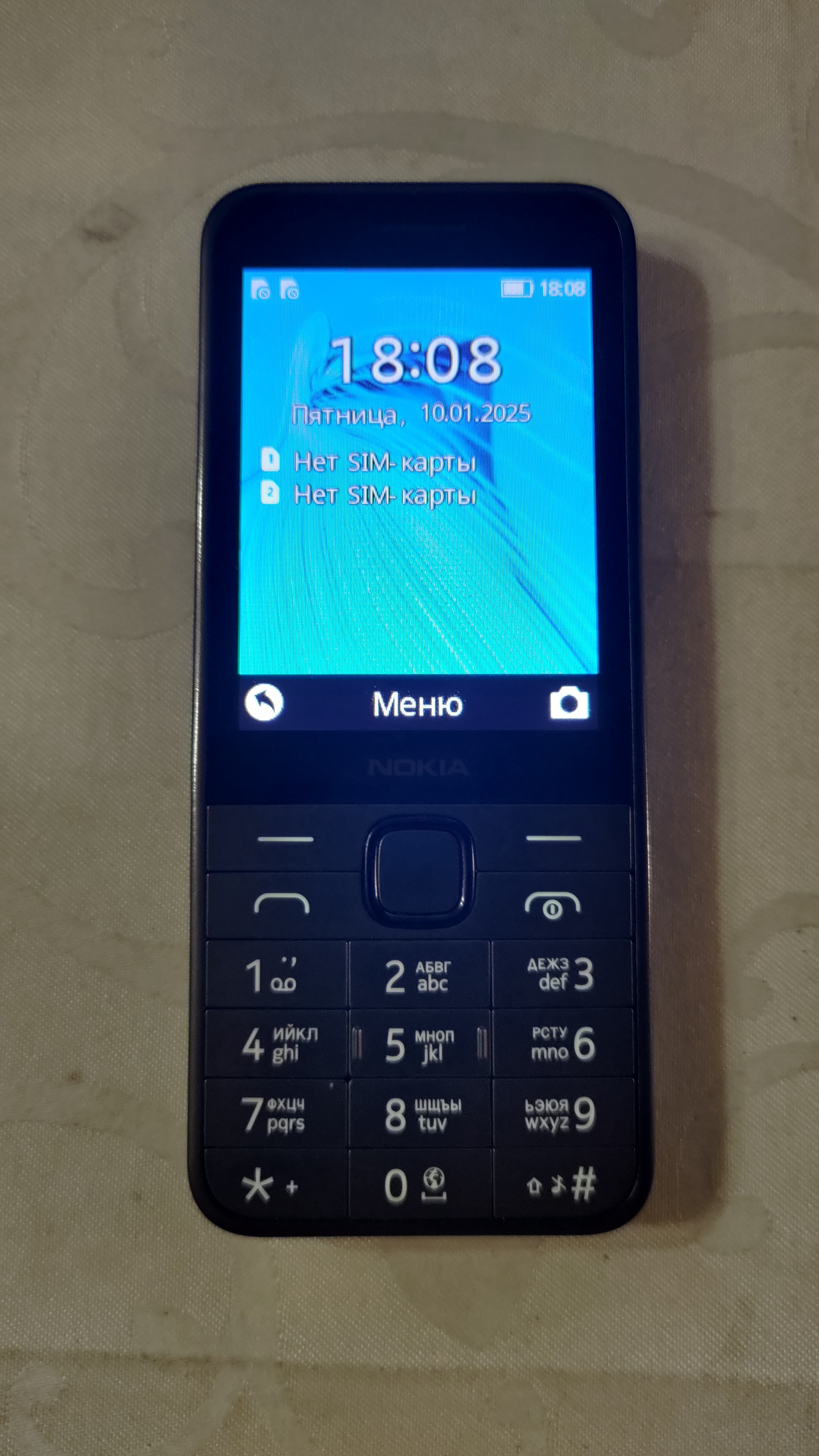
- Nokia 235 4G in black
- Brand: Nokia
- Developer: HMD Global
- Manufacturer: Foxconn
- Type: Feature phone
- First released: May 2024; 2 years ago
- Predecessor: Nokia 225 4G (2020)
- Compatible networks: GSM 850/1800/1900; UMTS 850/900/2100; LTE Varies by regional model GPRS; EDGE; HSPA
- Form factor: Bar
- Colors: Blue; Black; Purple
- Dimensions: 127.3 mm (5.01 in) H 54.2 mm (2.13 in) W 11.6 mm (0.46 in) D
- Weight: 120 g (4.2 oz)
- Operating system: Series 30+
- System-on-chip: Unisoc T107
- Memory: 64 MB
- Storage: 128 MB
- Removable storage: microSDHC, up to 32 GB (dedicated slot, hot-swappable)
- SIM: Dual nanoSIM
- Battery: Nokia BA-L4M, 1450 mAh, 3.8 V user replaceable Li-ion
- Charging: USB-C
- Rear camera: 2 MP (1600×1200px max.); LED flash QVGA video recording (320×240 px. MPEG4 at 15 fps max.)
- Display: 2.8 in (71 mm) diagonal IPS LCD; 240 × 320 px QVGA; 1:1.3̅ (or 3:4) aspect-ratio full-screen 16.7M colors
- Sound: Mono speaker, 3.5mm stereo audio jack
- Connectivity: Bluetooth 5.0 with A2DP and LE; USB 2.0 (USB-C)
- Data inputs: Keypad
- Made in: China
- Website: https://www.hmd.com/en_int/nokia-235-4g-2024

The Nokia 235 4G is a Nokia-branded Feature phone developed by HMD Global, released in May 2024. It was released alongside the Nokia 215 4G (2024) and Nokia 225 4G (2024). The Nokia 3210 4G shares identical specifications except for a bespoke body and being fitted with the 2.4 inch screen from the 225 4G. These were HMD Global's first feature phones to include a USB-C connector for charging and data transfers. Access to Cloud Apps is included, except for variants sold in Europe and China.

== LTE bands ==
Model Band	TA-1612 (Vietnam/Myanmar/Nepal)	TA-1614 (EU/rest of AMEA&APAC)	TA-1616 (China/India)	TA-1745 (2nd Edition)
01	Yes	Yes	Yes	Yes
03	Yes	Yes	Yes	Yes
05	Yes	Yes	Yes	Yes
07	No	Yes	No	Yes
08	Yes	Yes	Yes	Yes
20	No	Yes	No	Yes
28	No	Yes	No	Yes
38	No	Yes	Yes	Yes
39	No	No	Yes	Yes
40	No	Yes	Yes	Yes
41	No	Yes	Yes	Yes

== Nokia 235 4G 2nd Edition ==
In 2026, HMD Global released an improved version, branded Nokia 235 4G 2nd Edition, with a number of cosmetic changes and features such as Sikey AI chatbot and Xpress Chat app.
