= Nokia 225 =

Series 30+-based mobile phone

Nokia 225 / Nokia 225 Dual SIM
- Brand: Nokia
- Developer: Nokia
- Manufacturer: Nokia
- Type: Feature phone
- First released: May 2014; 12 years ago
- Availability by region: June 3, 2014 (India)
- Discontinued: Yes
- Compatible networks: GSM 900 / 1800; GSM 850 / 1900
- Form factor: Bar
- Colors: Red; Yellow; Green; Black; White
- Dimensions: 124 mm (4.9 in) H 55.5 mm (2.19 in) W 10.4 mm (0.41 in) D
- Weight: 99.8 g (3.53 oz) (Single SIM) / 100.6 g (3.56 oz) (Dual SIM)
- Operating system: Nokia OS (Series 30+)
- Removable storage: microSDHC (dedicated slot)
- SIM: Mini-SIM (Single SIM) or Dual SIM (Mini-SIM, dual stand-by)
- Battery: Removable Li-Ion 1200 mAh (BL-4UL)
- Charging: microUSB 2.0
- Rear camera: 2 MP, 1/5.0"
- Front camera: No
- Display: 2.8 in (71 mm) TFT LCD, 256K colors 240 x 320 pixels, 4:3 ratio (~143 ppi density)
- Model: RM-873 (Single SIM); RM-924 (Dual SIM)

The Nokia 225 & 225 Dual SIM are mobile phones manufactured by Nokia and announced on April 9, 2014. Launched on June 3, 2014, by Microsoft in India, the phones came with a 2.80-inch display with a resolution of 240x320 pixels at a pixel density of 142 pixels per inch (ppi).

== Specifications ==
Nokia 225 and 225 Dual SIM were powered by a single-core processor. The Nokia 225 Dual SIM runs on Series 30+ and is powered by a 1200mAh removable battery with standbay time up to 36 days and 27 days for the dual-SIM variant.

As far as the cameras are concerned, the Nokia 225 and 225 Dual SIM on the rear packs 2-megapixel camera.

Nokia 225 and 225 Dual SIM based on Series 30+, and supports storage expansion via microSD card (up to 32GB). The Nokia 225 Dual SIM is a dual-SIM (GSM and GSM) mobile that accepts Regula cards.

Connectivity options for the Nokia 225 and 225 Dual SIMinclude Bluetooth v3.00 and FM radio.

The Nokia 225 and 225 Dual SIM measures 124.00 x 55.50 x 10.40mm (height x width x thickness) and weighs 100.60 grams.

Pre-installed apps include Asphalt 6, Assassins Creed 3, Block Breaker 3, The Avengers and Real Football 2012.
