= Nokia 230 =

Mobile phone model

Nokia 230 / Nokia 230 Dual SIM
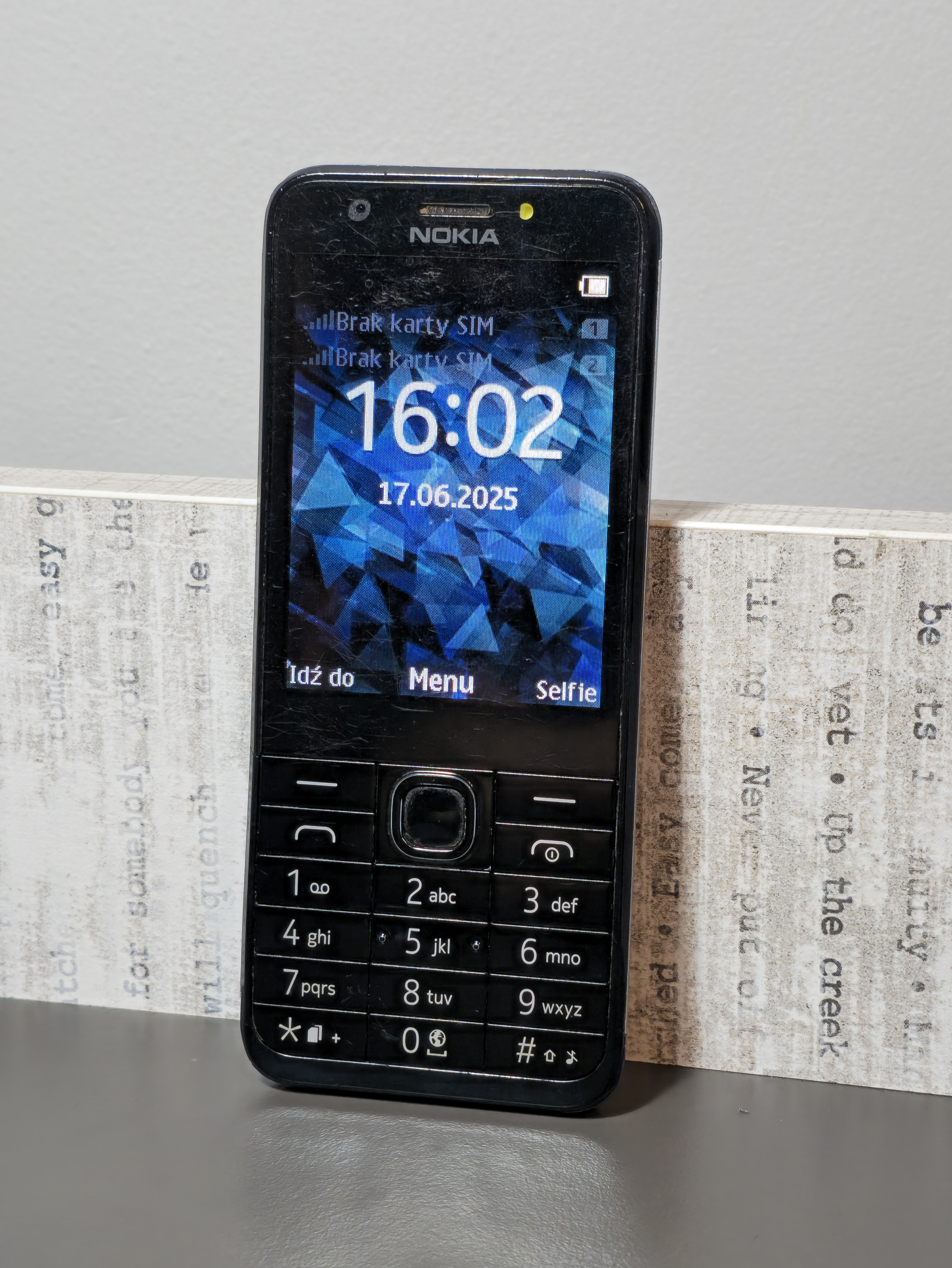
- Nokia 230 in black
- Brand: Nokia
- Developer: HMD Global (formerly Microsoft Mobile)
- Manufacturer: Foxconn (formerly Microsoft Mobile)
- Type: Feature phone
- Series: Nokia 3-digit series
- Predecessor: Nokia 222
- Successor: Nokia 230 (2024)
- Compatible networks: GSM (900/1800 MHz); GPRS and EDGE
- Colors: Dark Silver, Silver, Dark Blue, Light Gray
- Dimensions: H: 124.6 mm (4.91 in); W: 53.4 mm (2.10 in); D: 10.9 mm (0.43 in)
- Weight: 91.8 g (3.24 oz)
- Operating system: Nokia Series 30+
- Memory: 16 MB RAM
- Removable storage: microSD, up to 32 GB
- Battery: 1200 mAh Li-ion, removable (Nokia BL-4UL)
- Rear camera: 2 MP with LED flash Video: 240p@15fps
- Front camera: 2 MP with LED flash Video: 480p
- Display: 2.8 in (71 mm) 240 x 320 (~143 ppi pixel density) QVGA TFT with 65K colors
- Connectivity: 3.5 mm headphone jack; Bluetooth 3.0; FM radio, Stereo; micro USB 1.1
- Data inputs: Keypad

The Nokia 230 (2015) and Nokia 230 Dual SIM are Nokia-branded feature phones originally developed by Microsoft Mobile. The phones were originally released in December 2015, and sold again by HMD Global in November 2018. The Nokia 230 has one SIM card slot, and the Nokia 230 Dual SIM with two slots. Initially, the phones were only released in black and white, but HMD would later add dark blue and light gray color options, after the release of Nokia 106 (2018) in November 2018.

== Features ==
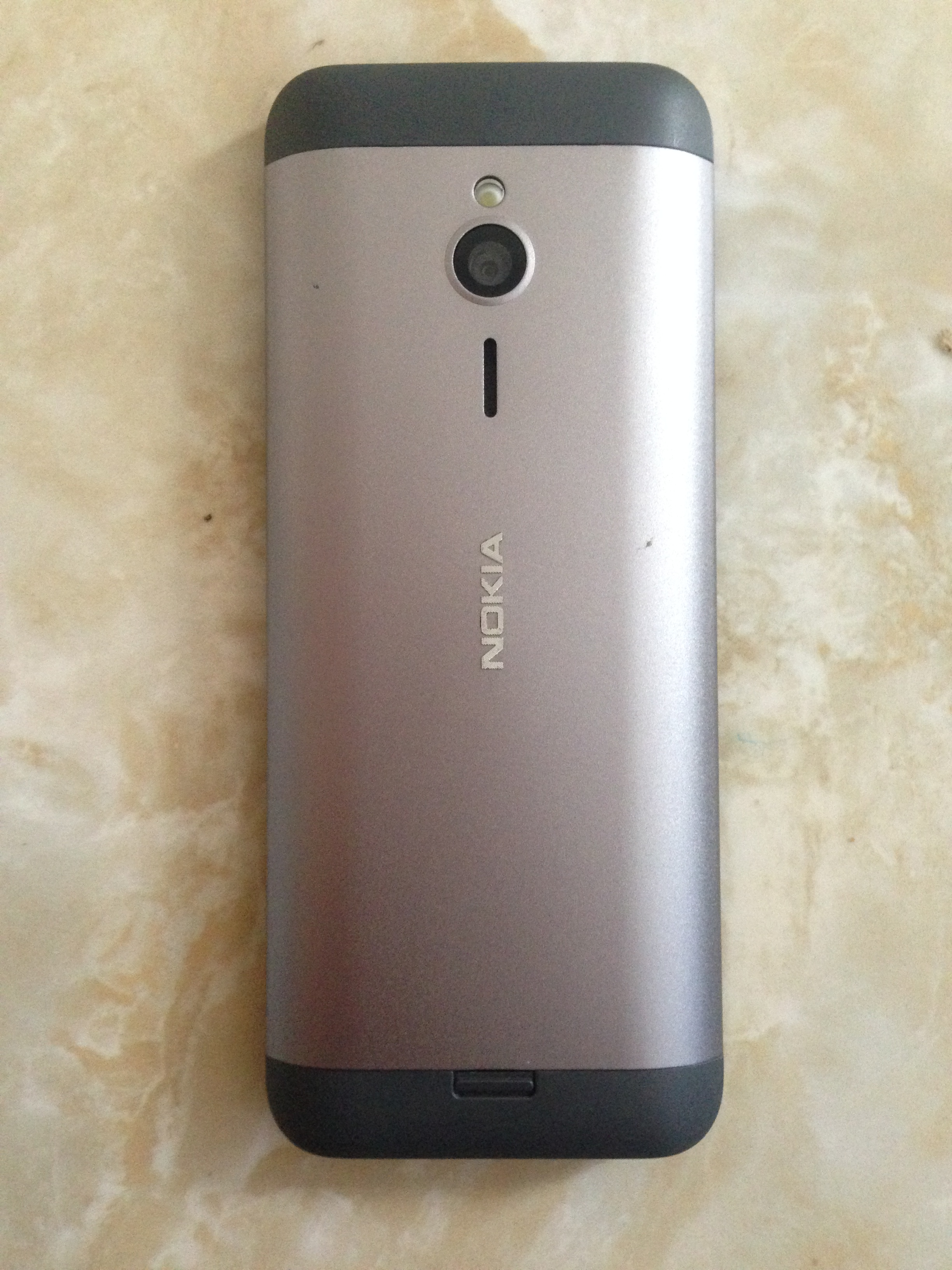
Nokia 230

The phone comes with a 2.8 inch TFT screen, 2 MP cameras with flash and Nokia Series 30+ operating system. The Series 30+ is a licensed software platform and interface licensed from MediaTek, not part of Nokia's previous Series 30 platform.

The Microsoft version of Nokia 230 featured J2ME support, but later removed in the 2018 HMD version of the phone.

== 2024 version ==
In 2024, HMD Global announced the 2024 version of Nokia 230, with metal design similar to the original version, but with additional metal accents surrounding the external speaker, flash LED, and camera, and supports USB-C charging. This phone run Mocor OS instead of MediaTek MAUI's based Series 30+, so that the phone cannot run any user-installable applications.
