= Nokia 3310 (2017) =

Nokia-branded feature phone

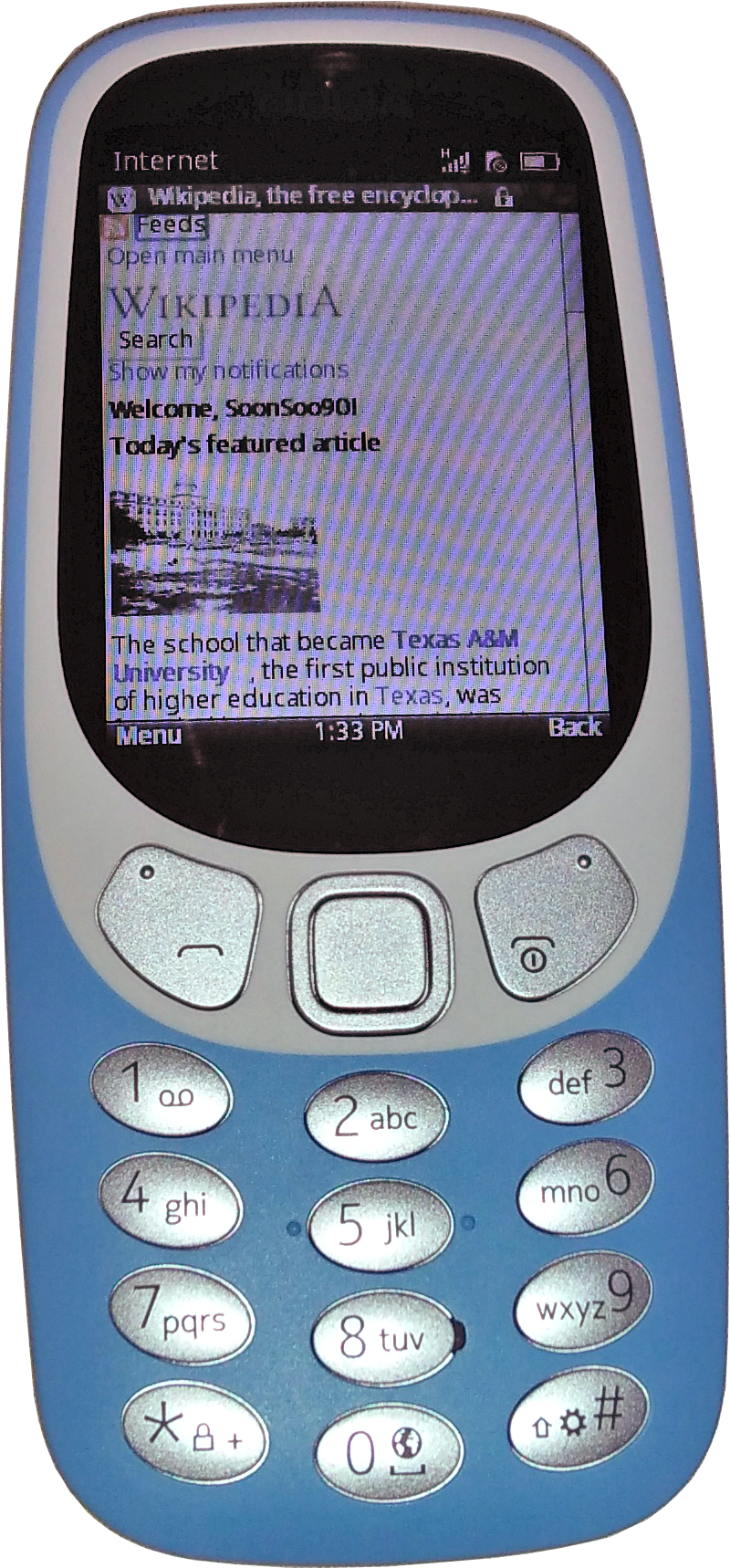
- Nokia 3310 3G with Opera Mini browser
- Brand: Nokia
- Developer: HMD Global
- Manufacturer: Foxconn
- Type: Feature phone
- Series: Nokia Originals
- First released: 26 February 2017; 9 years ago (2G); 29 October 2017; 9 years ago (3G)
- Discontinued: November 2022
- Predecessor: Nokia 3310
- Related: Nokia 150; Nokia 8110 4G
- Compatible networks: GSM (2G version) GSM/HSPA (3G version) GSM/TD-SCDMA/LTE-TDD (4G China Mobile (CMCC) version)
- Form factor: Bar, candybar
- Dimensions: 3310 (2G): H: 115.6 mm (4.55 in); W: 51 mm (2.0 in); D: 12.8 mm (0.50 in); 3310 (3G/4G); H: 117 mm (4.6 in); W: 52.4 mm (2.06 in); D: 13.35 mm (0.526 in)
- Weight: 79.6 g (2.81 oz) (2G); 84.9 g (2.99 oz) (3G, Single-SIM); 88.2 g (3.11 oz) (3G, Dual-SIM); 88.1 g (3.11 oz) (4G, CMCC)
- Operating system: Series 30+ based on MediaTek MAUI (2G); Java-powered Smart Feature OS, later Series 30+ based on Mocor RTOS (3G); AliOS (4G, CMCC)
- System-on-chip: MediaTek MT6260 (2G); Spreadtrum SC7701B (3G); Spreadtrum SC9820A (4G, CMCC)
- Memory: 8 MB (2G); 128 MB (3G); 256 MB (4G)
- Storage: 16 MB (2G version); 128 MB (3G version); 512 MB (4G, CMCC version)
- Removable storage: microSD, up to 32GB (2G and 3G) microSD, up to 64GB (4G, CMCC)
- Battery: 1200 mAh Li-ion (removable) standby time: up to 31 days (2G) up to 27 days (3G, Single-SIM) up to 25.3 days (Dual-SIM, non-3G) up to 24 days (3G, Dual-SIM) up to 15 days (4G, CMCC, GSM-only) up to 12 days (4G, CMCC, TD-SCDMA or LTE-VoLTE)
- Rear camera: 2 MP with LED flash
- Display: 2.4 in (61 mm) 240×320 QVGA TFT LCD
- Data inputs: Alphanumeric keypad
- Website: Nokia 3310; Nokia 3310 3G

The Nokia 3310 (2017) is a Nokia-branded feature phone developed by HMD Global. It was announced on 26 February 2017 at Mobile World Congress (MWC) 2017 as a revival of the original Nokia 3310 that was produced from the early 2000s, also being HMD's first product of the Nokia Originals line. The phone has a MediaTek processor and runs the Series 30+ platform. An improved model with 3G support was released on 29 October 2017 with a Spreadtrum processor and which runs on Java-compatible Smart Feature OS, while another 3G revision released in 2019 runs on a modified Series 30+ derived from Smart Feature OS.

== Launch ==
On 14 February 2017, it was reported that a modernised version of the 3310 would be unveiled at the 2017 Mobile World Congress in Barcelona by HMD Global, a Finnish manufacturer with rights to market phones under the Nokia brand, with the price point of 59 euros. On 26 February 2017, the modernised version of the 3310 was relaunched at a price of €49.

The initial 3310 release only came with support for 2G networks, which led to criticism especially as a number of countries, including the United States, Australia and Singapore were in the process of phasing out their 2G networks; an improved variant of the phone with support for 3G networks was later announced by HMD, released on 29 October 2017.

== Functions and design ==
The 3310 has functions like an FM radio, the Opera Mini web browser, a voice recorder, and a 2-megapixel camera with flash for photos and video recording. The flash LED doubles as a flashlight. Certain models have Bluetooth 3.0 and a Dual-SIM tray. The display has a polarized layer for outdoor use.

The original Snake game has been replaced by Gameloft's Snake Xenzia with updated modes and graphics. It is also possible to sideload Java-based applications using the .jad and .jar format. Available apps are browsers, games, internet radios, etc.

The design of the phone heavily mimics its predecessor both in design and form factor. It comes in two glossy colors, red and yellow, as well as two matte colors similar to the original Nokia 3310: dark blue and grey.

=== 3G version ===
The 3G model has many improvements and changes apart from the 3G radio. The internal storage has been increased from 16 MB to 128 MB, and there are some cosmetic changes, including a new silver keypad. It comes in four new colors: yellow, "warm" red, azure and charcoal, all matte. The phone's size has slightly increased (by 13.29%) to ergonomically make typing on the keypad easier. The 3G radio has reduced battery talk time, but slightly increased standby time. All 3310 3G versions support Bluetooth 2.1.

The 3310 3G also runs a Java-based operating system that HMD calls "Smart Feature OS" (based on Mocor RTOS). Its appearance is similar to the Series 30+ as on the 2G version, but has a new customizable interface. However, only sim-slot 1 is 3G compatible, the slot 2 is still only 2G capable.

In 2019, HMD released the newer revision of Nokia 3310 3G without J2ME games and apps support. This device run modified Series 30+ based on Mocor RTOS.

=== 4G version ===
A 4G version was released in late January 2018 in China in partnership with China Mobile. It runs AliOS, an incompatible fork of AOSP (Android), and can create WiFi hotspots using the LTE data connection. Internal storage has been increased to 512 MB, and 64 GB memory cards are now supported.

== Reception ==
HMD announced on 2 July 2017 that the 3310 received great demand and was as a result sold out in many markets.

UK retailer Carphone Warehouse said on 7 March 2017 that demand was "astonishing".

The new 3310 received mixed reviews. CNET praised the phone's battery life, price, and durability, but TechRadar and The Guardian said the device lacks much of the utility to which modern users have become accustomed.

One consensus among most reviewers was the nostalgia of playing the iconic Snake game.

Some counterfeit versions of the phone have been produced due to the model's popularity.

== Variants ==
Variant	Model Number	Supported Network	Number of SIM cards supported	Connectivity	Platform	SOC	Ref.
Nokia 3310	TA-1008	GSM 900/1800	1	WLAN No Bluetooth 3.0, A2DP GPS No Radio FM radio USB microUSB 2.0	Series 30+	MT6260	
Nokia 3310 (Dual SIM)	TA-1030	GSM 900/1800	2	WLAN No Bluetooth 3.0, A2DP GPS No Radio FM radio USB microUSB 2.0	Series 30+	MT6260	
Nokia 3310 3G	TA-1022	GSM 900/1800, WCDMA band 1/8	1	WLAN No Bluetooth 2.1, A2DP GPS No Radio FM radio USB microUSB 2.0	Feature OS (later Series 30+)	SC7701B	
Nokia 3310 3G (Dual SIM)	TA-1006	GSM 900/1800, WCDMA band 1/8	2	WLAN No Bluetooth 2.1, A2DP GPS No Radio FM radio USB microUSB 2.0	Feature OS (later Series 30+)	SC7701B	
Nokia 3310 3G (Quad band)	TA-1036	GSM 850/900/1800/1900, WCDMA band 1/2/5/8	1	WLAN No Bluetooth 2.1, A2DP GPS No Radio FM radio USB microUSB 2.0	Feature OS (later Series 30+)	SC7701B	
Nokia 3310 4G	TA-1077	GSM 900/1800, TD-SCDMA band 34/39, LTE-TDD band 38/41,39,40	1	WLAN Wi-Fi 802.11 b/g/n Bluetooth 4.0, A2DP, LE GPS Yes Radio FM radio USB microUSB 2.0	YunOS	SC9820A	
