= Nokia 215 4G =

Feature phone branded by Nokia

- Brand: Nokia
- Developer: HMD Global
- Type: Feature phone
- Series: Nokia 3-digit series
- First released: October 17, 2020
- Availability by region: Yes
- Predecessor: Nokia 215
- Successor: Nokia 215 4G (2024)
- Related: Nokia 225 4G
- Compatible networks: GSM, HSPA, LTE
- Form factor: Candybar
- Colors: Black, Cyan Green
- Dimensions: 124.7 mm (4.91 in) H 51 mm (2.0 in) W 13.7 mm (0.54 in) D
- Weight: 90.3 g (3.19 oz)
- Operating system: Series 30+
- CPU: 1.0 GHz Cortex-A7 (Unisoc UMS9117)
- Memory: 64 MB RAM
- Storage: 128 MB
- Removable storage: microSDHC (dedicated slot)
- Battery: 1150 mAh Li-ion (removable)
- Rear camera: None
- Front camera: None
- Display: 2.4-inch TFT LCD, 256K colors 240 x 320 pixels, 4:3 ratio (~167 ppi)
- Sound: Loudspeaker, 3.5mm jack
- Connectivity: Bluetooth 5.0, Micro-USB 2.0
- Model: TA-1284, TA-1281, TA-1272, TA-1264
- SAR: 1.14 W/kg (head), 1.35 W/kg (body)
- Other: FM radio (built-in antenna), Flashlight (LED), Snake

The Nokia 215 4G is a feature phone manufactued and design by HMD Global under the brand Nokia, released on October 17, 2020 in China and November 14, 2020 in India, featuring a T9 keypad.

== Specifications ==
The Nokia 215 4G features a 2.4-inch QGVA display, 128MB of internal storage, 32GB od expandable storage via microSC, a 4G VoLTE connectivity, pre-installed MP3 player, web browser and video games, and a removable 1150 mAh battey which provides a 24-day standby time.
