= Nokia 105 (2019) =

Feature phone made by HMD Global

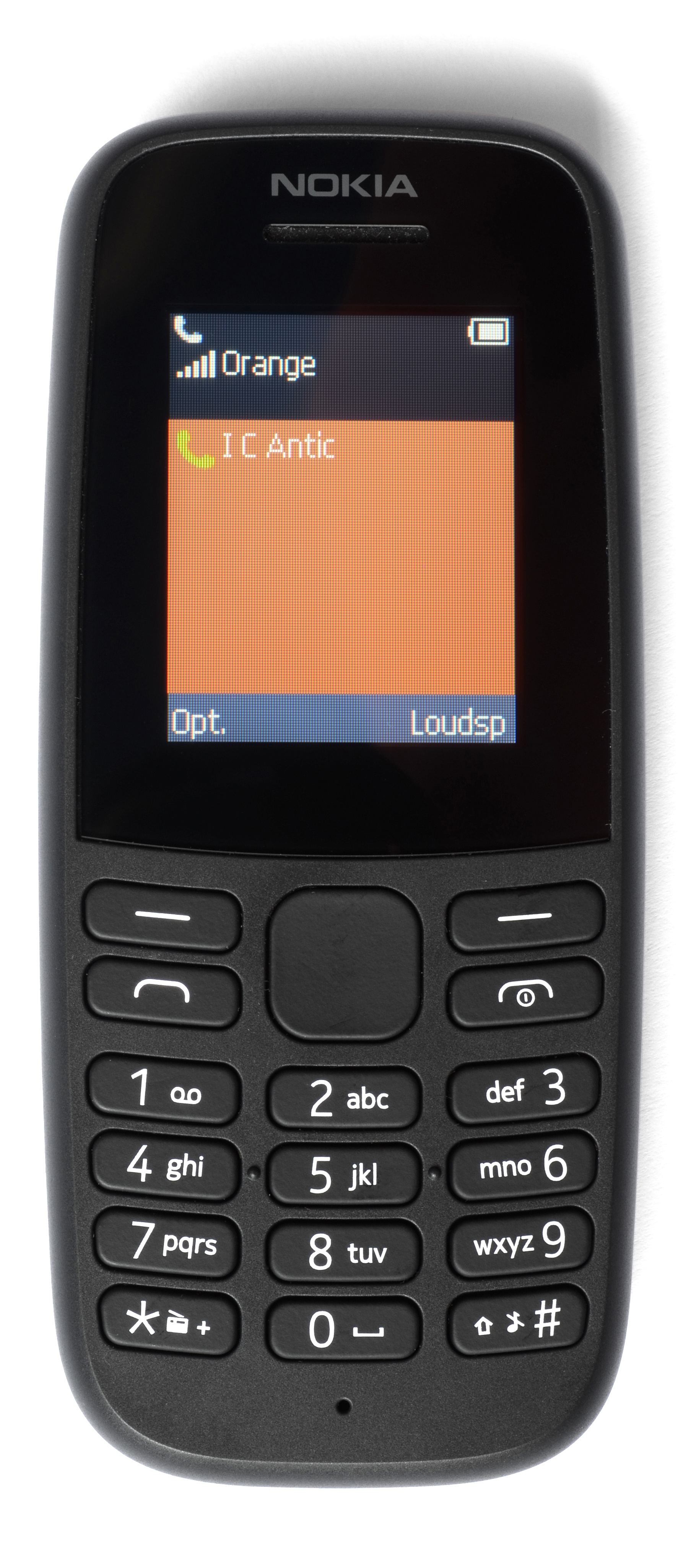
- Brand: Nokia
- Developer: HMD Global
- Manufacturer: Foxconn
- Type: Feature phone
- Series: Nokia 3-digit series
- First released: September 2019
- Predecessor: Nokia 105 (2017)
- Successor: Nokia 105 (2022)
- Related: Nokia 105; Nokia 220 4G; Nokia 105 4G
- Form factor: Bar
- Dimensions: 119.0×49.2×14.4 mm (4.69×1.94×0.57 in)
- Weight: 73.02 g (2.576 oz)
- Operating system: Series 30+
- System-on-chip: Spreadtrum SC6531EFM
- Memory: 4MiB
- Storage: 4MiB
- Battery: 800 mAh, Li-ion
- Display: 1.77 inches (45 mm), QQVGA, 113dpi
- Connectivity: FM Radio, EDGE, GPRS
- Other: Flashlight
- Website: www.hmd.com/en_int/nokia-105-2019

Nokia 105 (2019), also known as Nokia 105 4th Edition, is a Nokia-branded feature phone developed by HMD Global. It was unveiled on 24 July 2019 alongside the Nokia 220 4G and released in September 2019. The phone is available in three colours; blue, pink and black.

The phone uses the Series 30+ operating system. Connectivity is restricted to 2G services.

With some versions of this new model, the T9 automatic dictionary is somewhat limited.

The phone has many games accessible from the main menu, some of which can be played only a few times, requiring purchase.

In February 2020, the phone received an iF Design Award 2020 by iF International Forum Design.

== Gallery ==
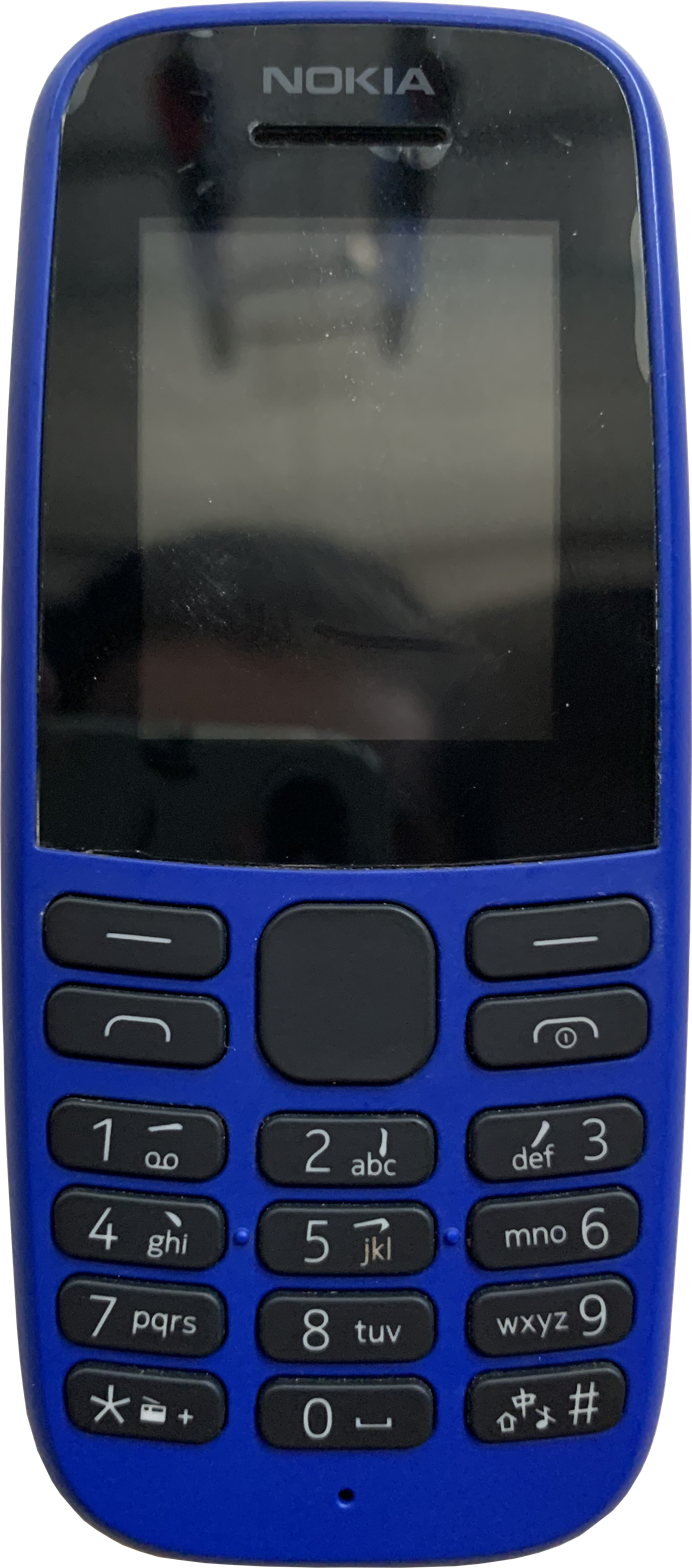
Version with blue case

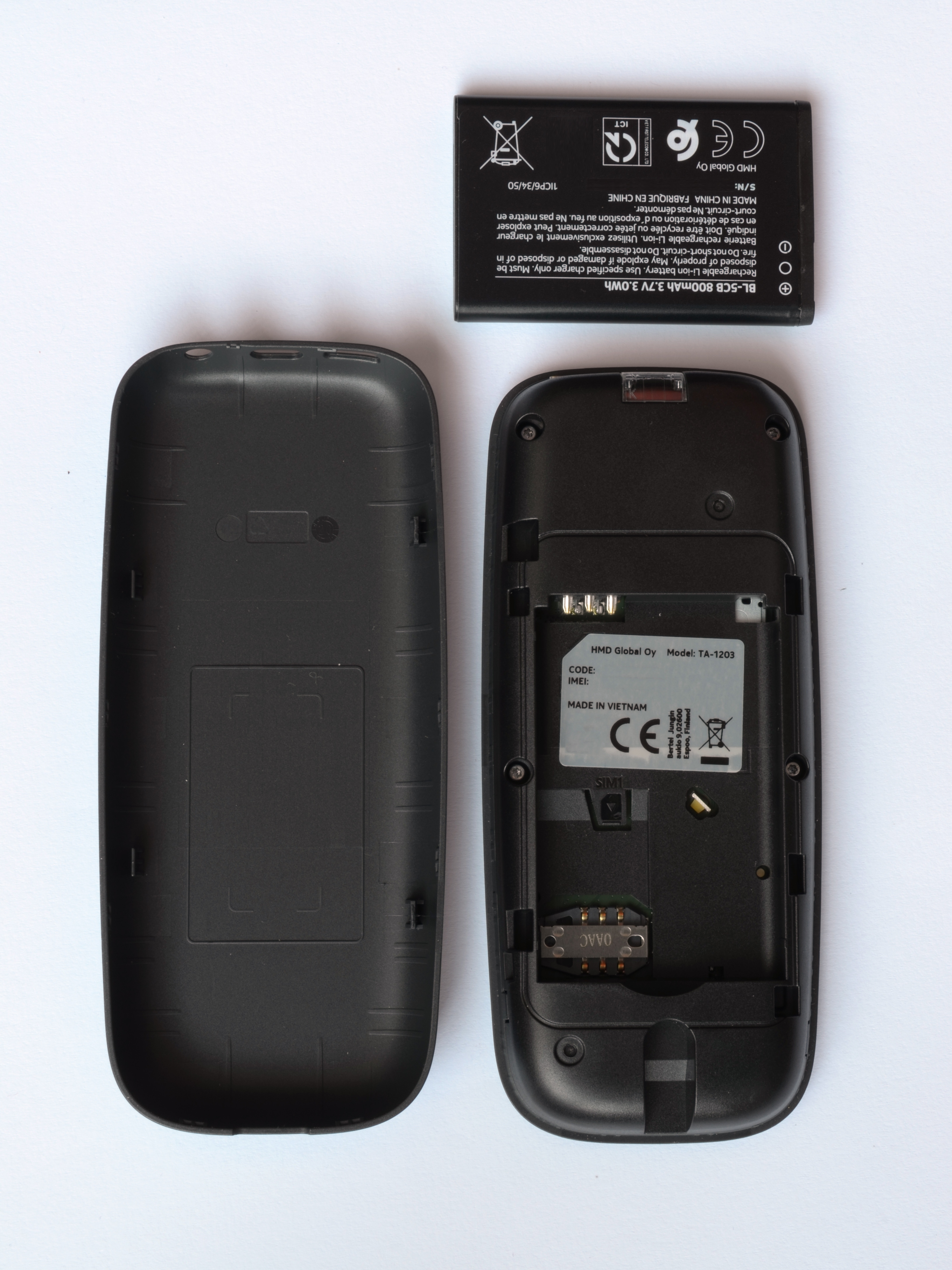
Internals of single-SIM version

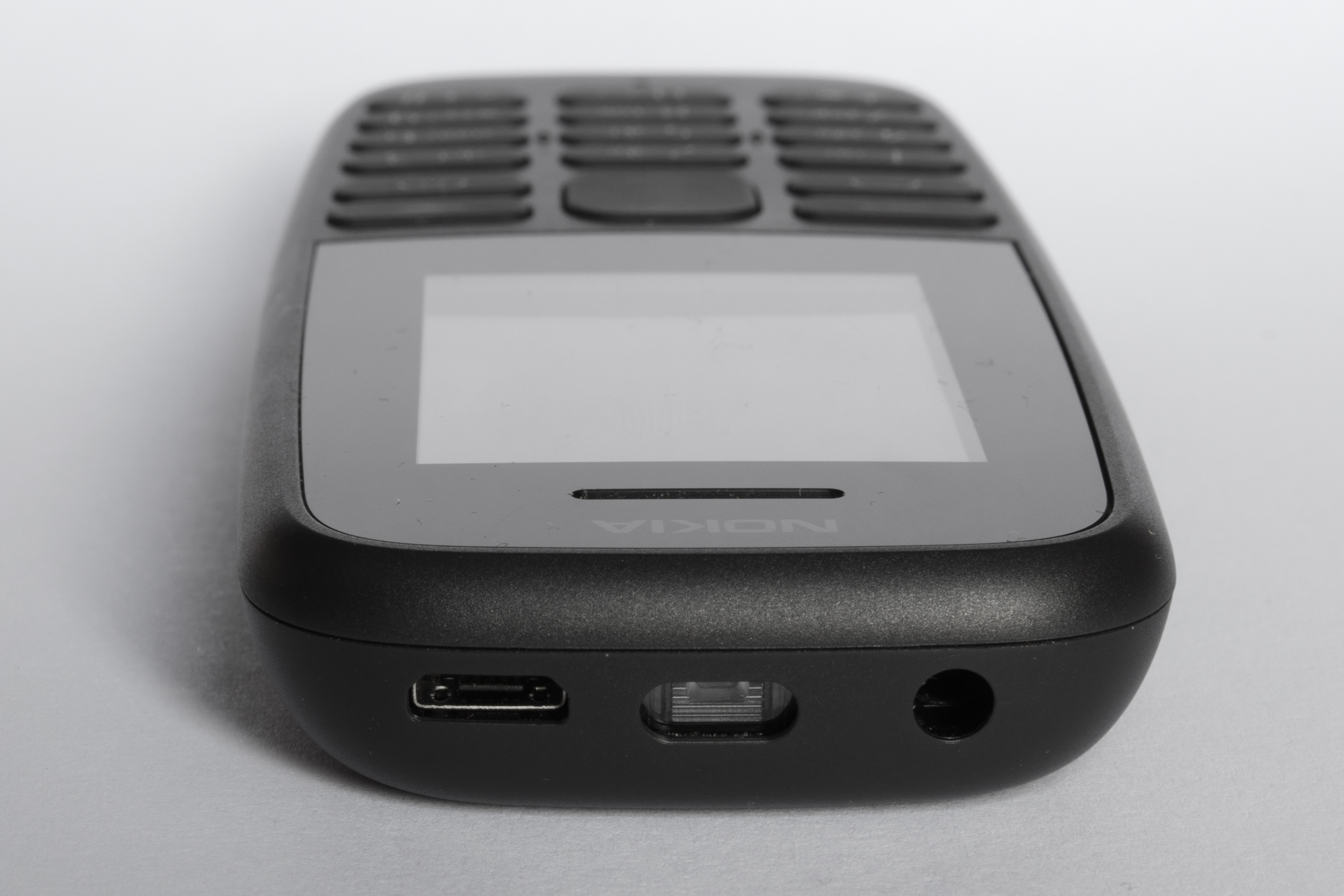
Top showing (left to right) Micro-USB power socket, flashlight and headset socket

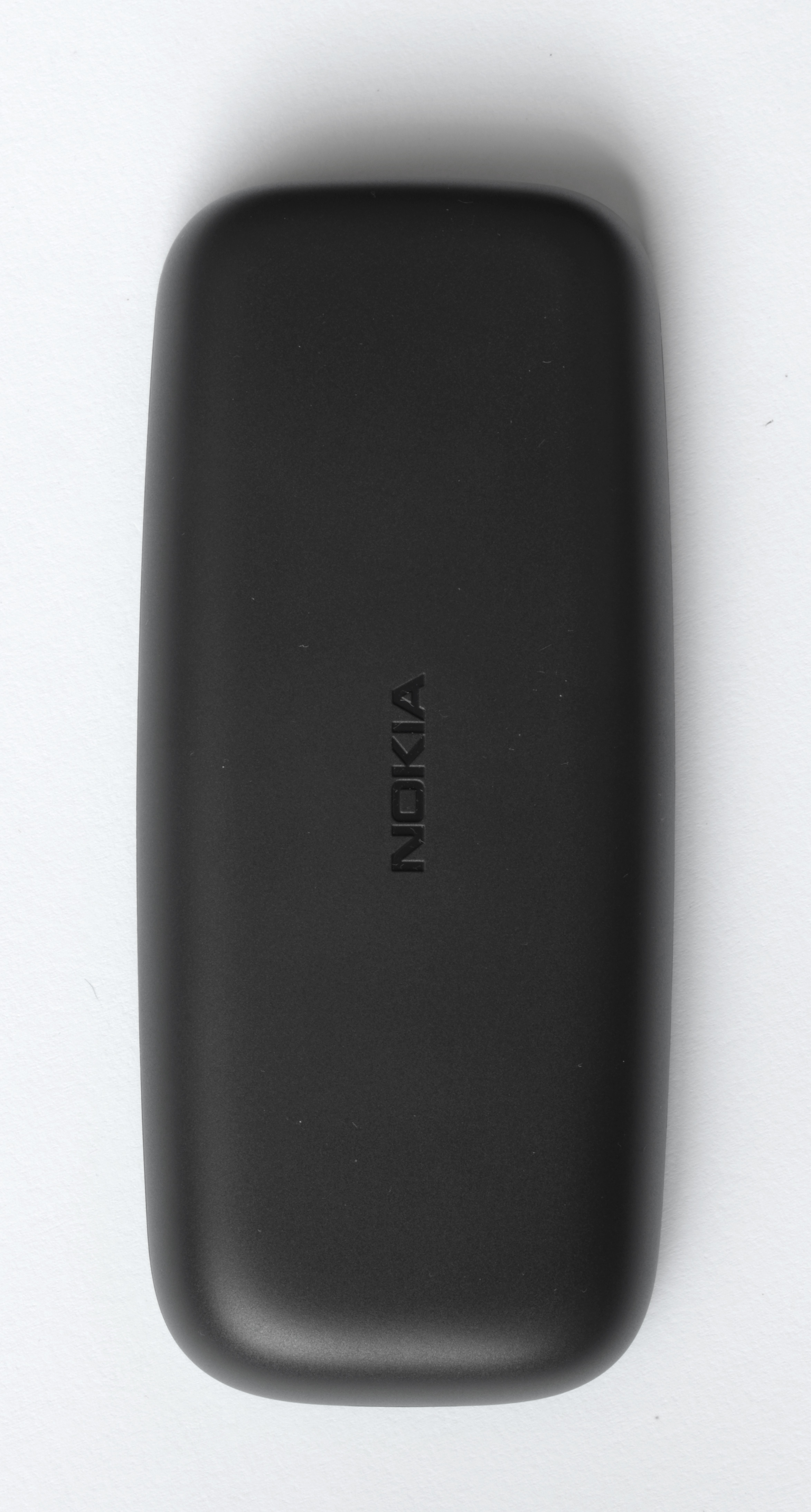
Rear

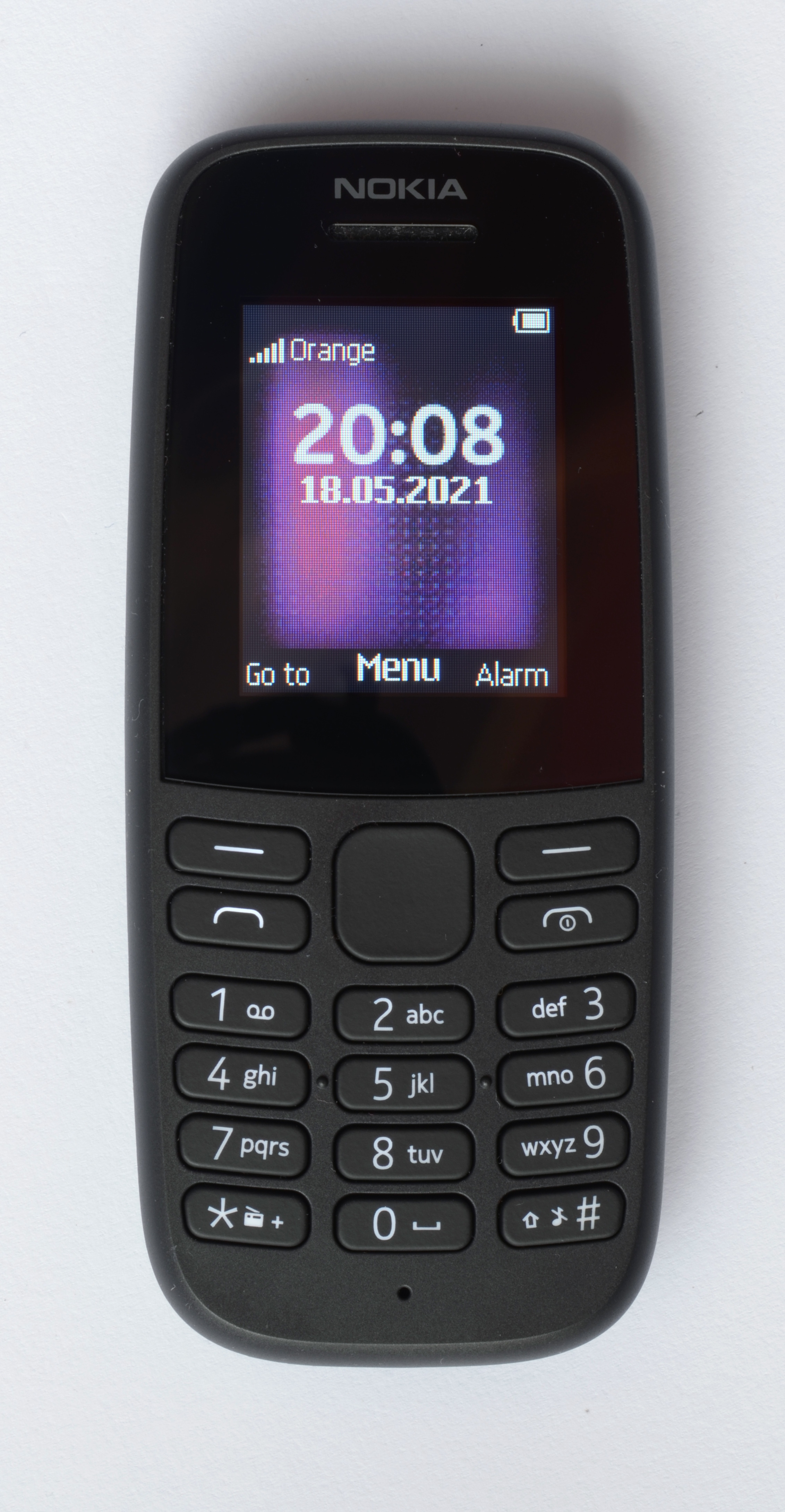
Displaying home screen
