= Nokia 225 4G =

2020 mobile phone model

- Brand: Nokia
- Manufacturer: HMD Global
- Type: Feature phone
- Series: Nokia 200 series
- First released: October 13, 2020
- Related: Nokia 215 4G
- Compatible networks: GSM, WCDMA (HSPA), LTE
- Form factor: Bar
- Colors: Black, Classic Blue, Metallic Sand
- Dimensions: 124.7 mm (4.91 in) H 51.0 mm (2.01 in) W 13.7 mm (0.54 in) D
- Weight: 90.1 g (3.18 oz)
- Operating system: Series 30+
- System-on-chip: Unisoc T107 (2024 version); Unisoc USM9117 (original version)
- Memory: 64 MB RAM
- Storage: 128 MB
- Removable storage: microSDHC up to 32 GB
- Battery: 1450 mAh (2024 version); 1150 mAh (original version); Li-ion (removable)
- Rear camera: 0.3 MP (VGA)
- Display: 2.4 in (61 mm) TFT, 256K colors 240 x 320 pixels (~167 ppi density)
- Sound: Loudspeaker, FM radio (wired & wireless dual mode)
- Connectivity: Bluetooth 5.0; USB-C (2024 version); Micro-USB 2.0 (original version); 3.5 mm headphone jack

The Nokia 225 4G is an LTE feature phone manufactured by HMD Global under the brand Nokia. It was announced on October 13, 2020, along with the Nokia 215 4G and Nokia Essential Wireless Headphone, and India release on November 18, 2020 via offline retailers.

The 225 4G was succeeded by the 2024 model year with the same name. It has a 0.3-megapixel VGA main camera, a microSD card expandable up to 32GB, and a 2.4-inch display. The processor of the 2024 version is the Unisoc T107.

== Features ==
- 1150 mAh battery, which sustains battery life up to 6 hours and 21 minutes (updated to 1450 mAh in 2024 version)
- Unisoc USM9117 chipset (updated to Unisoc T107 in 2024 version)
- Exclusive T-Mobile support (US only)
- 128MB of internal storage
- 64MB of RAM
