= Nokia 225 4G (2024) =

2024 mobile phone model

Nokia 225 4G (2024) HMD 225 4G (2024)
- Brand: Nokia
- Manufacturer: HMD Global
- Type: Feature phone
- Series: Nokia 200 series
- First released: April 30, 2024
- Form factor: Candybar
- Dimensions: 121.5 mm × 52 mm × 11.6 mm (4.78 in × 2.05 in × 0.46 in)
- Operating system: Series 30+
- System-on-chip: Unisoc T107 (22 nm)
- CPU: 1.0 GHz Cortex-A7
- Memory: 64 MB RAM
- Storage: 128 MB
- Removable storage: microSDHC up to 32 GB (dedicated slot)
- Battery: 1450 mAh Li-Ion (removable)
- Charging: USB-C
- Rear camera: 0.3 MP (VGA) with LED flash & video
- Display: 2.4-inch TFT LCD, 256K colors 240 x 320 pixels (~167 ppi density)
- Sound: Loudspeaker, 3.5mm jack
- Connectivity: 4G LTE, Bluetooth 5.0, USB-C 2.0
- Other: Wireless FM radio, MP3 player, Cloud Apps (YouTube Shorts, News, Weather)
- Website: https://www.hmd.com/en_int/nokia-225-4g-2024?sku=1GF025FPC2L01

The Nokia 225 4G (2024) is a feature phone that was manufactured by HMD Global under the brand Nokia. It features a Cortex-A7 CPU, a VGA camera, a microSD card that was expandable up to 32GB, and a USB-C charging port.

It houses a 2.4-inch TFT LCD display with a resolution of 240 × 320 pixels, a removable battery with 1450 mAh, a Unisoc T107 chipset, and a Series 30+ operating system.

In July 2024, HMD Global went to a continuation of the "denokiasation", which is rebranded as the HMD 225 4G (2024).
