= Nokia 150 =

Mobile phone model

Nokia 150 / Nokia 150 Dual SIM
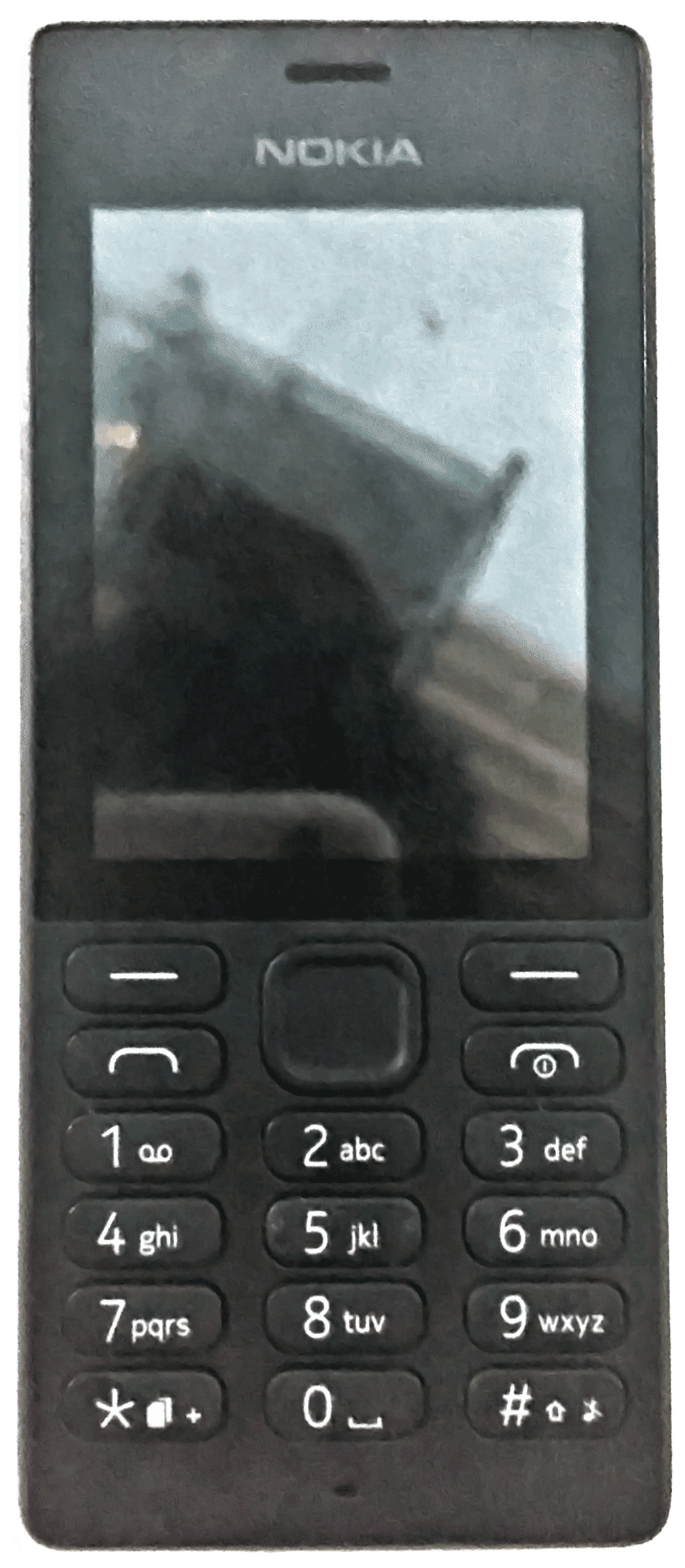
- Brand: Nokia
- Developer: HMD Global
- Manufacturer: Foxconn
- Series: 3-Digit series
- First released: 13 December 2016; 9 years ago January 2017; 6 years ago (disputed)
- Predecessor: Nokia 130
- Successor: Nokia 150 (2020)
- Related: Nokia 130 (2017); Nokia 216
- Compatible networks: GSM 900 / 1800
- Form factor: Monoblock
- Dimensions: 106.0 mm (4.17 in); 45.5 mm (1.79 in); 13.9 mm (0.55 in)
- Weight: 81 g (2.86 oz)
- Operating system: Nokia Series 30+
- Removable storage: up to 32 GB microSDHC
- Battery: 1020 mAh Li-Ion (Nokia BL-5C); Micro-B USB charger
- Rear camera: VGA
- Display: 2.4" LCD, 320x240 pixels (167 ppi)
- Sound: 3.5mm AV jack, speaker
- Connectivity: USB 2.0 micro-B; Bluetooth 3.0; FM radio
- Data inputs: Keypad
- Other: Flashlight LED (on back)

Nokia 150 and Nokia 150 Dual SIM are Nokia-branded entry-level mobile phones from HMD Global. Originally introduced in December 2016, as the first Nokia-branded devices by HMD Global, the 150 supports one Mini-SIM card and 150 Dual SIM supports two Mini-SIM cards.

The Nokia 150 has a flashlight. Display is 2.4 inches with QVGA 320x240 resolution. It is a TFT panel with 65K colours. It supports vibration, has a loudspeaker and a 3.5mm standard headphone jack.

Wireless connectivity includes support for Bluetooth 3.0 and 2G networks. This may pose a problem in some countries, like Singapore, where 2G is no longer in use.

It does not have the threaded view or conversations layout of text messages. It has a microUSB port for charging and microSD slot for extra data storage.

The 1020 mAh removable battery rated for 25 full days (600h) of standby and 22 hours of call time.

It has a 0.3 MP fixed focus rear camera with video recording capability.

It has audio/video playback support.

It has 2 games: Snake Xenzia and Nitro Racing. However, some Nokia 150 units sold in certain regions do not have the Nitro Racing game.

It comes with black and white colors.

== Specifications ==
The Nokia 150 runs on an updated Series 30+ UI. The Nokia 150 and 150 Dual SIM both are expected to provide the user with very long use times.

== Controversy ==
According to the BBC, the phone, identified by the model no. (RM-1189) had been used by Islamist militant organisations throughout the UK as an IED device and been used to attempt terrorist attacks around the UK.
