= Nokia 106 =

Mobile phone model

- Manufacturer: Nokia
- Type: Feature phone
- Series: Nokia 3-digit series
- Successor: Nokia 106 (2018); Nokia 106 (2023)
- Compatible networks: GSM (900/1800 MHz); GSM (850/1900 MHz)
- Colors: Black, White, Red
- Dimensions: H: 112.9 mm (4.44 in); W: 47.5 mm (1.87 in); D: 14.9 mm (0.59 in)
- Weight: 74.2 g (2.62 oz)
- Operating system: Nokia Series 30
- Battery: 800 mAh Li-ion, removable (Nokia BL-5CB)
- Rear camera: None
- Display: 1.8 in (46 mm) 128 x 160 (~114 ppi pixel density) QVGA TFT with 65K colors
- Connectivity: 3.5 mm headphone jack; FM radio; Proprietary charger
- Data inputs: Keypad
- Other: Flashlight

The Nokia 106 is a discontinued feature phone manufactured by Nokia. The phone was announced in August 2013 and was released firstly in China, in the third quarter of 2013.

== Specifications ==
NETWORK	Technology	GSM

LAUNCH	Announced	2013, August. Released 2013, November
LAUNCH	Status	Discontinued

BODY	Dimensions	112.9 x 47.5 x 14.9 mm, 70.6 cc (4.44 x 1.87 x 0.59 in)
BODY	Weight	74.2 g (2.61 oz)
BODY	SIM	Mini-SIM
BODY		Flashlight

DISPLAY	Type	TFT, 65K colors
DISPLAY	Size	1.8 inches, 10.2 cm^{2} (~19.0% screen-to-body ratio)
DISPLAY	Resolution	128 x 160 pixels (~114 ppi density)

MEMORY	Card slot	No
MEMORY	Phonebook	500 contacts
MEMORY	Call records	Yes
MEMORY	Internal	384 kB RAM

CAMERA	No

SOUND	Loudspeaker	Yes
SOUND	3.5mm jack	Yes

COMMS	WLAN	No
COMMS	Bluetooth	No
COMMS	Positioning	No
COMMS	NFC	No
COMMS	Radio	FM radio
COMMS	USB	Proprietary (charging only)

FEATURES	Sensors	-
FEATURES	Messaging	SMS
FEATURES	Games	Yes
FEATURES	Java	Yes
FEATURES		Digital clock Calculator Calendar Converter Expense manager

BATTERY	Type	Li-Ion 800 mAh, removable (BL-5CB)
BATTERY	Stand-by	Up to 840 h
BATTERY	Talk time	Up to 10 h

MISC	Colors	Black, White, Red
MISC	SAR	1.18 W/kg (head) 0.62 W/kg (body)
MISC	SAR EU	1.27 W/kg (head) 0.65 W/kg (body)

The phone has FM radio (headset required) and a speaking clock, but it does not support any connectivity option, like GPRS, EDGE, or Bluetooth.
