= Nokia 220 =

2014 mobile phone model

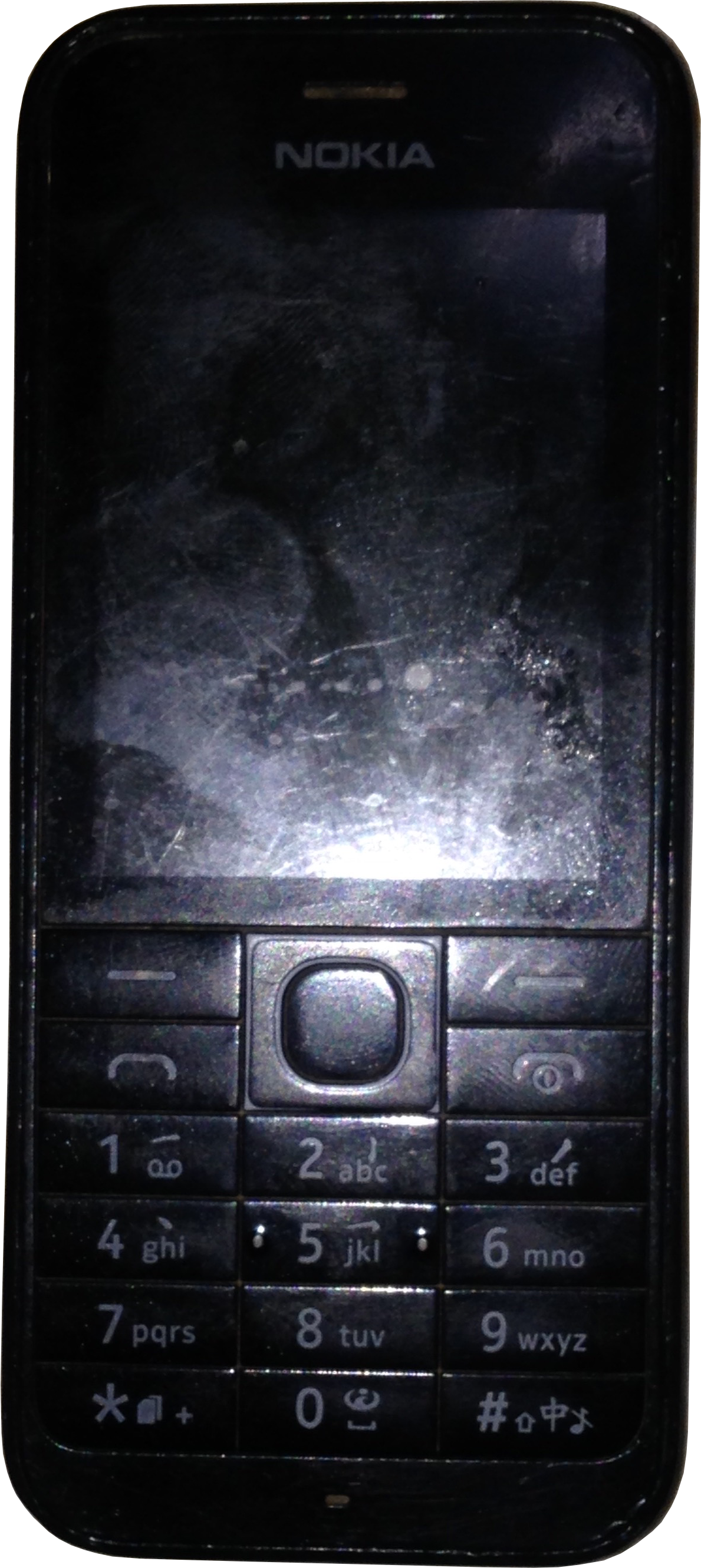
- Brand: Nokia
- Manufacturer: Nokia
- Type: Feature phone
- First released: February 2014
- Discontinued: Yes
- Successor: Nokia 220 4G
- Compatible networks: GSM 900 / 1800
- Form factor: Bar
- Colors: Red, black, white, yellow, cyan
- Dimensions: 116.4×50.3×13.2 mm (4.58×1.98×0.52 in)
- Weight: 83.6 g (2.95 oz)
- Operating system: Nokia OS
- Removable storage: microSDHC (dedicated slot)
- SIM: Mini-SIM (Single or Dual SIM)
- Battery: Removable Li-Ion 1100 mAh (BL-5C)
- Rear camera: 2 MP, 1/5.0"; Video: 320p@15fps
- Front camera: No
- Display: 2.4 in (61 mm) TFT LCD, 256K colors 240 x 320 pixels, 4:3 ratio (~167 ppi density)
- Model: RM-969 (Dual SIM)

The Nokia 220 is a Nokia-branded entry-level feature phone unveiled at MWC 2014 in Barcelona and was launched in February 2014.

== Features ==
The 220 was launched with the Series 30+ system interface. The phone has a 1.87 inch display with 128 x 160 pixels, and the model was presented in red, black, white, yellow, blue colors.

The phone has a 2.4-inch display with a resolution of 240 pixels x 320 pixels at 166 pixels per inch PPI. The memory can be expanded up to 32GB. The device has a 2 megapixel primary camera on the back. The Nokia 220 Dual SIM is powered by a 1100mAh removable battery. It measures 116.40 x 50.30 x 13.20 (height x width x thickness) and weighs 83.40 grams. The Nokia 220 Dual SIM is a dual SIM (GSM and GSM) cell phone that accepts Regular and Regular. Connectivity options include Bluetooth and FM radio. Bluetooth 2.1 with Nokia SLAM - a feature that allows you to share multimedia content with nearby phones.

The phone also offers a dust and splash resistant keypad. According to the official product page, the 1,100 mAh battery lasts up to 29 days, offers 15 hours of talk time and 51.5 hours of music playback.

In terms of internet browsing software, the Nokia 220 came with Bing as the default search engine, the Nokia Xpress browser, Facebook and Twitter.
