= Nokia 130 (2017) =

2017 Nokia branded mobile phone developed by HMD Global

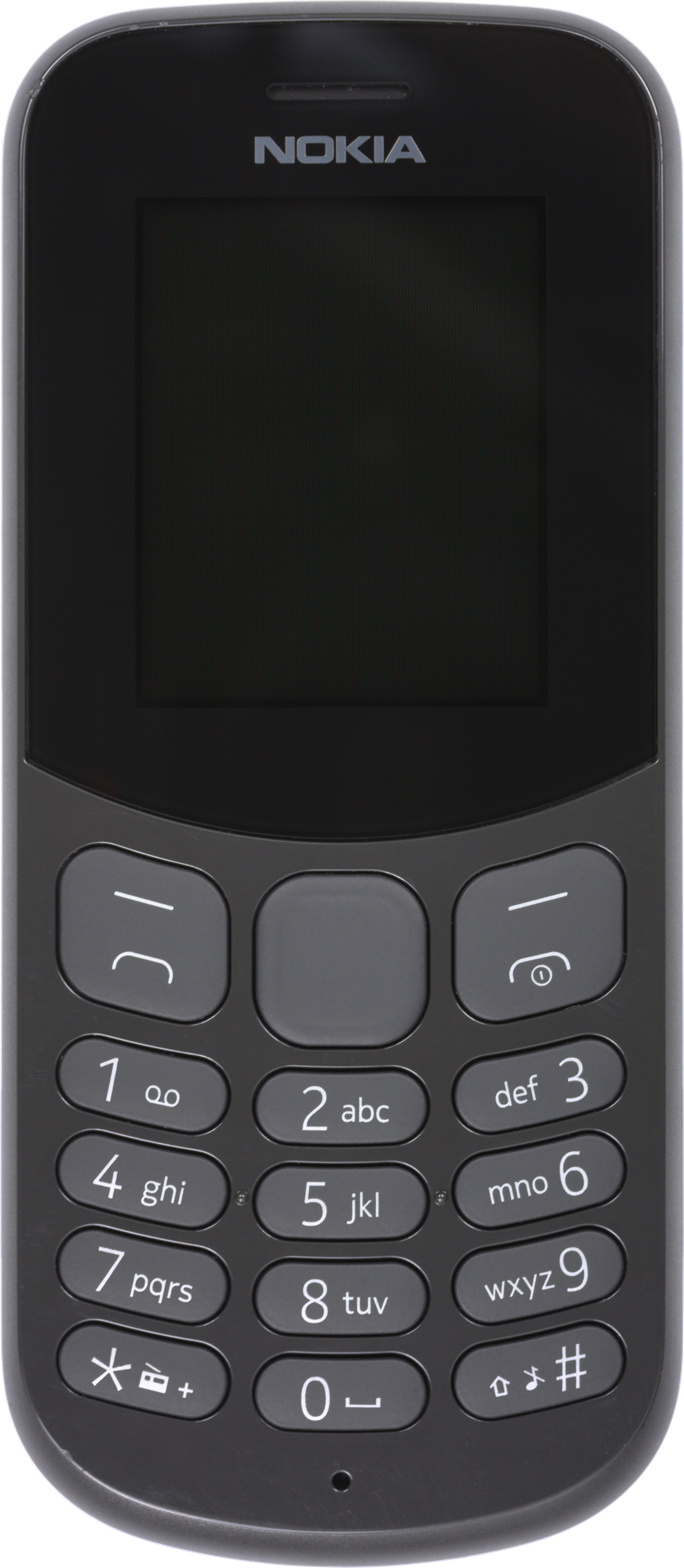
- Brand: Nokia
- Developer: HMD Global
- Manufacturer: Foxconn
- Type: Feature phone
- Series: Nokia 3-digit series
- First released: July 17, 2017; 8 years ago
- Compatible networks: GSM (900/1800 MHz); GPRS and EDGE
- Form factor: Bar
- Dimensions: H: 111.5 mm (4.39 in); W: 48.4 mm (1.91 in); D: 14.2 mm (0.56 in)
- Weight: 74.2 g (2.62 oz)
- Operating system: Series 30+
- Memory: 4 MB
- Storage: 8 MB
- Removable storage: 32 GB MicroSDHC
- Battery: Removable; 1020 mAh; BL-5C battery
- Rear camera: 0.3 MP, digital zoom Images: 640 × 480 px (VGA); Videos: 176 x 144 px, ~10 fps
- Display: 1.8 inches (46 mm), TFT, 65K colours, 160 × 120 px (QQVGA), 4:3 aspect-ratio
- Connectivity: Micro USB (USB 2.0), Bluetooth 3.0, 3.5 mm audio jack
- Data inputs: Keypad
- SAR: Head: 1.45 W/kg; Body: 1.41 W/kg
- Other: FM radio (requires wired headset), LED flashlight

Nokia 130 (2017) is a Nokia-branded mobile phone developed by HMD Global. It was released on 17 July 2017.

== Specifications ==
The phone has almost the same features as the predecessor. It is slightly larger (111.5 x 48.4 x 14.2 mm compared to 106 x 45.5 x 13.9 mm), has small optical design changes, image support, a file manager, and more games, like Air Strike, Danger Dash, Ninja Up, Sky Gift and Nitro Racing. It also features a rear-camera and an LED-flashlight at the top.

Even though the camera can be used to take photos and record videos, the resolution is limited to 640 x 480 pixel for images and 176 x 144 pixel for videos. Furthermore, by default, videos are recorded in only 9.598 frames per second and the built in memory of 8 MB holds less than 2 minutes of video footage. Neither the used image or video resolution nor their quality can be changed.

The Nokia 130 uses a Mini-SIM card for the Single as well as the Dual-SIM model and has a dedicated microSDHC card slot.

Even though the Nokia 130 has a camera, can display images and supports GPRS as well as EDGE, it is not able to display images that were received in a MMS-messages. The phone does support Bluetooth 3.0, but it can neither be paired with iOS devices nor can it receive images via a Bluetooth connection when no microSD card is inserted.

The phone does not have a front-camera, and does not include WLAN nor GPS.

== Gallery ==
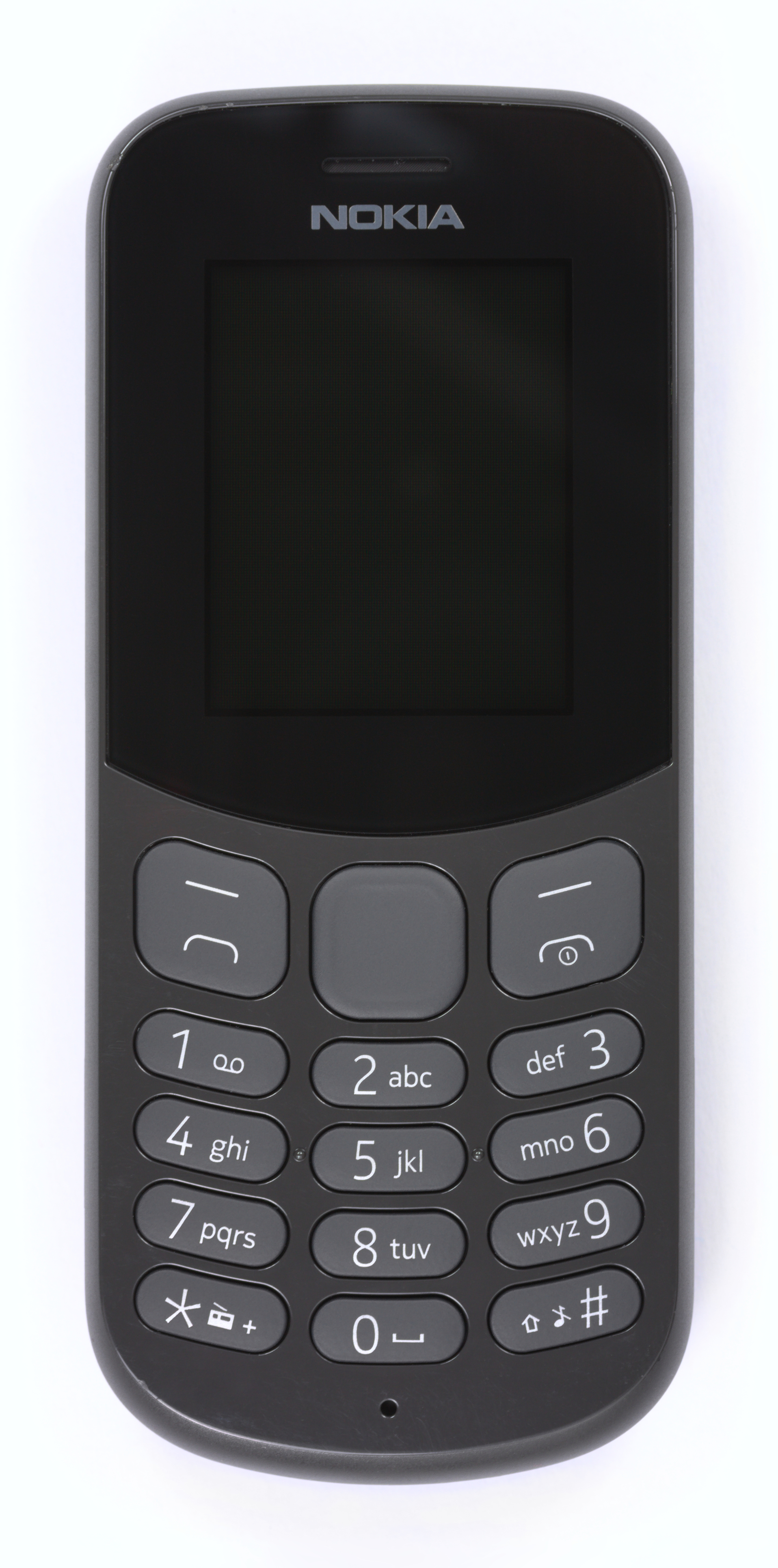
The phone's front side with a cover

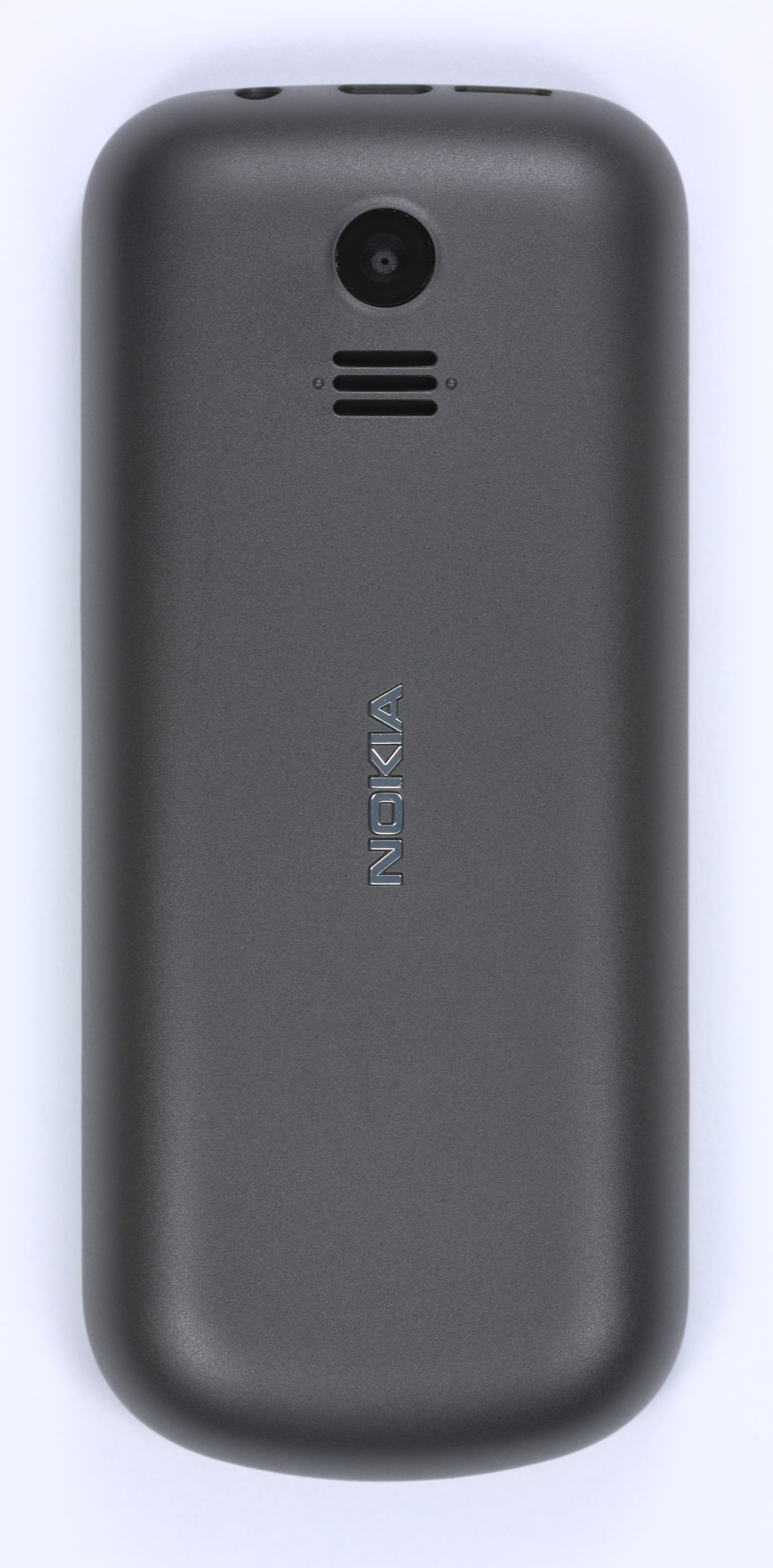
The phone's back side with a cover

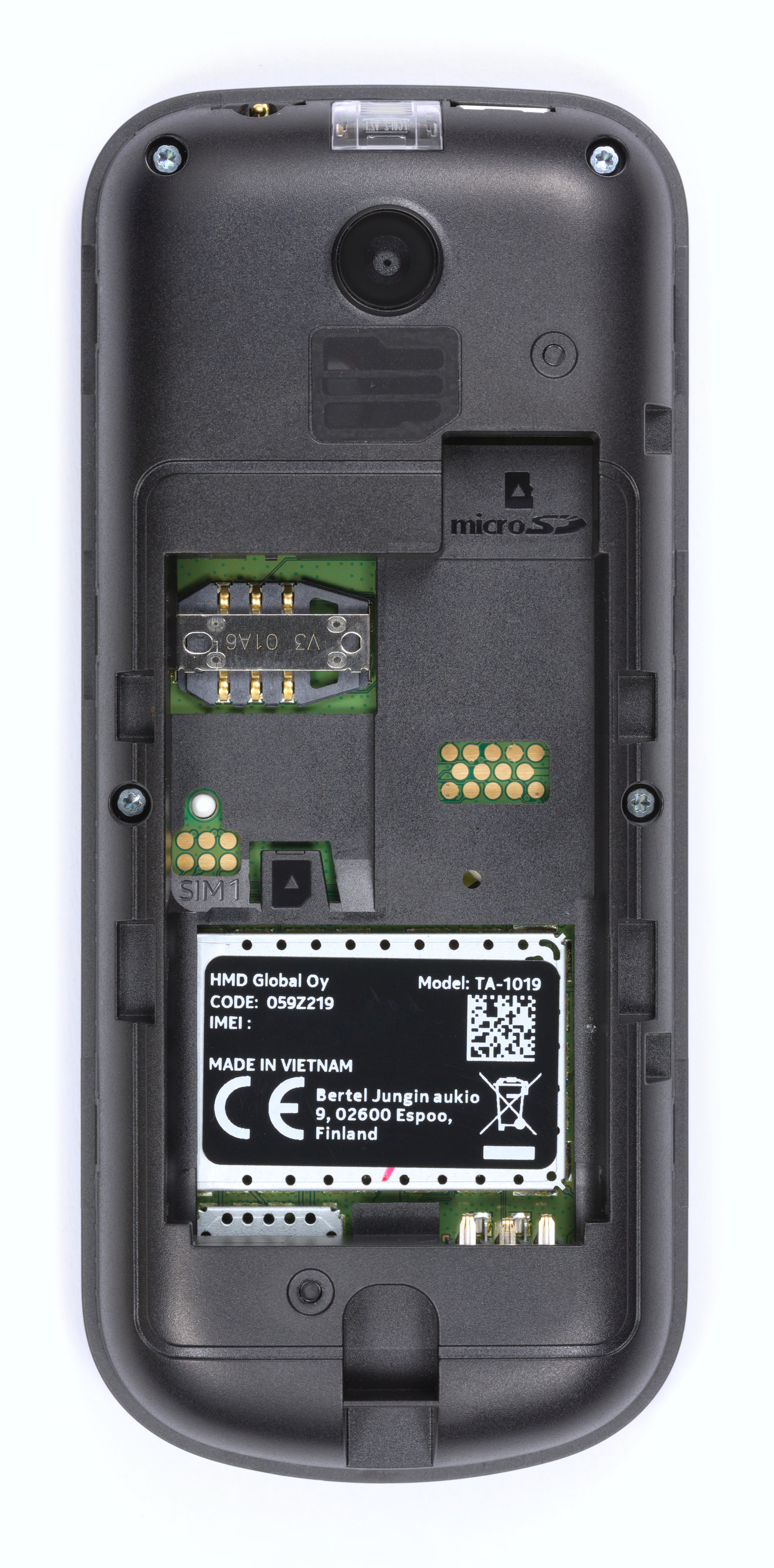
The phone's back side without a cover. This version has only one SIM-card

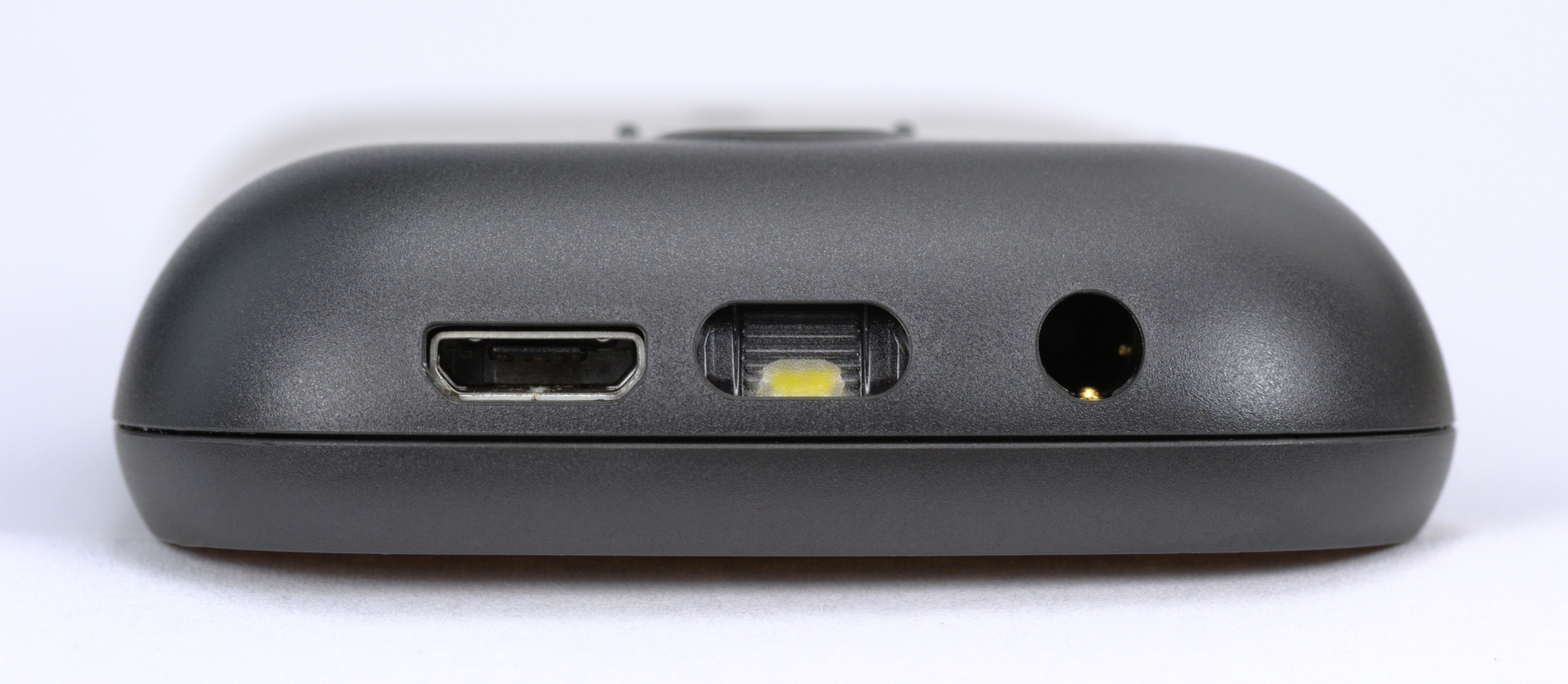
The phone's top side with Micro-USB receptacle, 3.5 mm audio jack and LED light
