= Series 30+ =

Software platform

- Series 30+ interface displaying the Menu on a Nokia 8210 4G
- Developer: Nokia (2013–2014); Microsoft Mobile (2014–2016); Human Mobile Devices (HMD) (2016–present)
- OS family: MediaTek MAUI; Mocor RTOS (for devices with Spreadtrum/Unisoc SoC)
- Initial release: September 2013; 13 years ago
- Marketing target: Feature phones
- Supported platforms: MediaTek MT62 or Spreadtrum/Unisoc (specific SoC varies)
- License: Proprietary software
- Preceded by: Series 30 and Series 40

Series 30+ (abbreviated as S30+) is a software platform and application user interface used for some Nokia-branded and HMD-branded mobile phones. It is the main software used for Nokia feature phones succeeding Series 30 and Series 40. Earlier Series 30+ devices following its inception in 2013 use MediaTek chips and are based on MAUI software, while most devices since 2020 (including all 4G phones) are developed on Unisoc chips and run the Series 30+ interface on top of Mocor RTOS.

== Features ==
=== Compatibility ===
Many S30+ devices only support MAUI Runtime Environment (MRE) and its associated application file (.vxp) developed by MediaTek, but some later devices with MediaTek chips have included support for J2ME (Java) applications. More recent S30+ models are built on Mocor RTOS and are no longer compatible with MRE software.

=== Applications ===
S30+ contain many of the basic mobile phone features. The devices also come preloaded with the Opera Mini web browser and a Facebook app client.

Some S30+ devices based on MediaTek MAUI that support MRE applications (except Nokia 220) have an online shop for downloading new apps and games, and several S30+ devices that support J2ME applications, including a model of the Nokia 3310 3G, which ran the preceding Smart Feature OS shipped with access to Opera Mobile Store. Currently, the S30+ online shop was not featured in some devices based on Mocor RTOS due to no longer being compatible with MRE/J2ME software.

Generally, Series 30+ is more limited as opposed to KaiOS, an operating system that HMD ships with certain other of its feature phones.

== History ==
Series 30+ was created for Nokia's new MediaTek based phones, having switched away from Base Band 5. It first appeared in September 2013 on the Nokia 108, and has been the main Nokia feature phone operating system after the end of the Series 30 and Series 40 platforms in 2014.

Menu displayed on a Nokia 222 (original S30+ design)

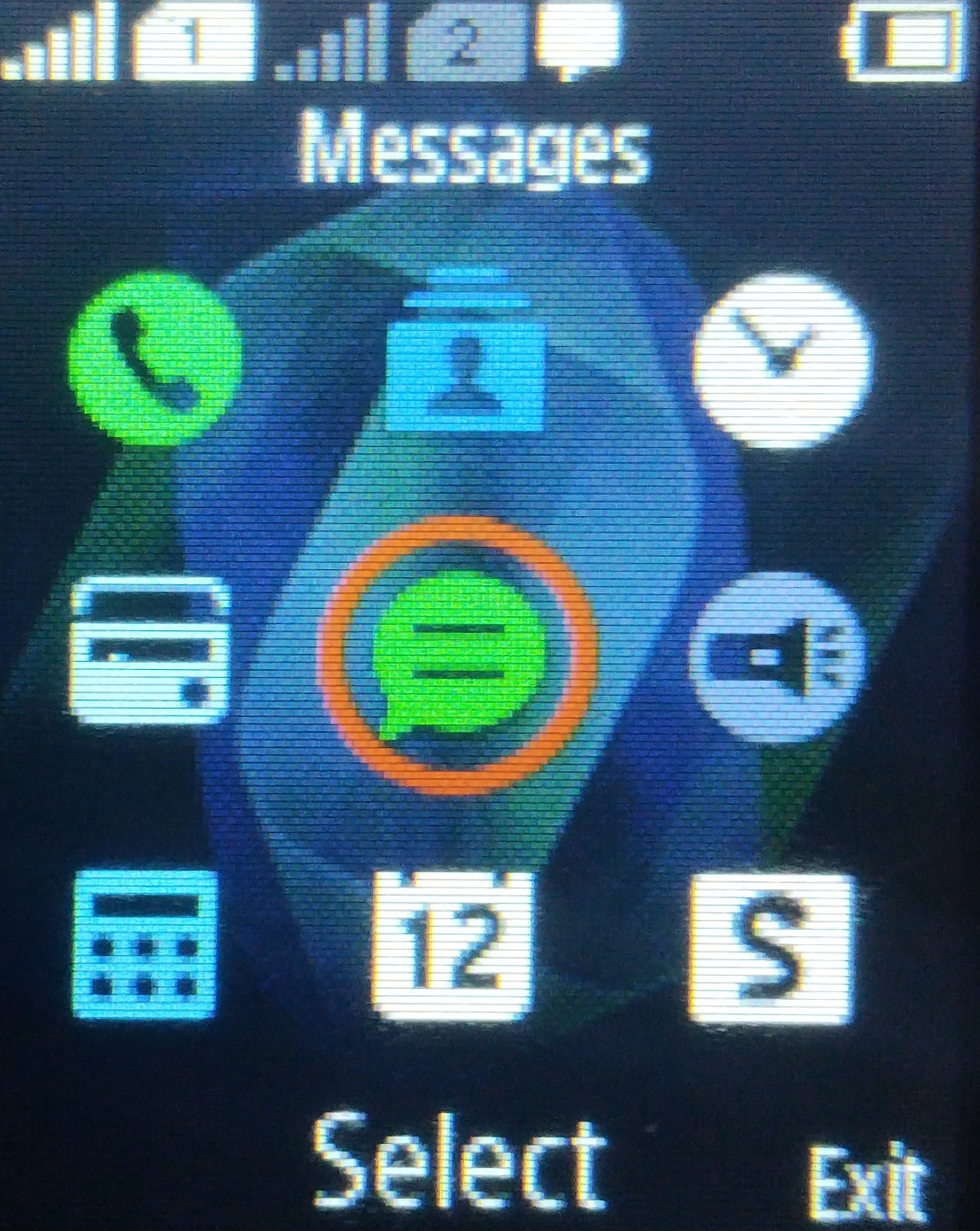
Menu Display on Nokia 105 2023 2G, TA-1557 with Cyan Variant

In October 2017, HMD Global released Nokia 3310 3G which (instead of Series 30+) runs on Smart Feature OS, a platform based on Mocor RTOS developed by Unisoc. Before this, in 2015 three Microsoft-branded prototype phones: RM-1181, RM-1182 and RM-1183 were reportedly developed running a prototype version of Smart Feature OS. Photos that surfaced in 2018 showed a redesigned user interface, featuring elements of the Windows 10 Mobile design language and Microsoft Account integration. Early Nokia 3310 3G units ran the same Smart Feature OS as the three Microsoft prototype phones, but featured a different user interface. This design language was later adopted by most Nokia-branded 4G phones running the successor Series 30+ platform, which is based on Mocor RTOS. This includes later models of the Nokia 3310 3G manufactured in 2019. Due to this, since 2018, Smart Feature OS name was later reused as a platform based on KaiOS, starting from Nokia 8110 4G.

Since late 2023, HMD has collaborated with CloudMosa to introduce various cloud-based widgets for feature phones using the Cloud Phone ("Cloud Apps For Feature Phone") technology. This partnership marks the first time that Nokia Series 30+ devices are capable of accessing YouTube, Shorts, TikTok, Google Sign-in Services and real-time modern web applications. The first device to support Cloud Apps on Series 30+ is the Nokia 110 4G (2023), with all devices released in 2023 onwards set to feature this capability through OTA updates. However, the Cloud Phone was not supported in Europe and China.

Since 24 April 2024, HMD launched four new 4G feature phones: Nokia 215 4G (Nokia 220 4G in China, India and Vietnam), 225 4G, 235 4G and Nokia 3210 (2024), all supporting the Cloud Phone technology. The HMD 105, 110 and HMD Barbie Phone are the first three devices that use the brand name HMD, while The Boring Phone is the only device that never use the brand name Nokia or HMD, instead use the brand name Heineken. On their specification sheets, these phones drop the name S30+ in favor of the generic Mocor RTOS name.

On 10 July 2025, a HMD-branded prototype touchscreen phone called HMD Wonka that possibility a revival of Nokia Asha series with the hardware design was similar to Nokia Lumia and HMD Skyline were reportedly developed running a modified version of Mocor RTOS for touchscreen devices. This device featuring several smartphone features, such as Wi-Fi support and have Wi-Fi hotspot, have built-in HMD Chat app, UPI payments app and Cloud Phone technology support, and uses a different graphical user interface that very similar to Android instead of the UI that firstly used in Nokia 3310 3G. In October 2025, the Wonka was officially released as the HMD Touch 4G, exclusively for India. It uses a full multi-touch touchscreen with a modified S30+ called "RTOS Touch", including a rebranded chat app to replace WhatsApp called Express Chat (previously HMD Chat) and had several changes compared to the prototype version, such as lock screen modified, and reduced the numbers of embedded games (only Snake was still included). This new model has been positively received as a potential new mobile operating system contender. In 2026, the Wonka was released in China as HMD Touch AI, as it featured ByteDance's Doubao AI chatapp hence the name of this device.

Later, on 13 July 2025, another HMD-branded prototype touchscreen phone called HMD Compass that possibility a revival of Nokia Asha series like HMD Wonka, with the hardware design was similar to Nokia Asha 501 were reportedly developed running a modified version of Mocor RTOS for touchscreen devices. This device have several features similar to the HMD Wonka but also have several different, such as different lock screen and featuring an work out app called GoPlay. In February 2026, the Wonka was officially released in cooperation with Xplora, called as the Xplora One for European countries. It's uses the same "RTOS Touch" from HMD Touch 4G, but without internet browser, social media applications and Cloud Phone technology.

Since 2026, HMD have several plans for upcoming Series 30+ devices, including bring several new features such as adding AI chatbot app called Sikey AI and social media app called Xpress Chat.

== List of devices ==
The following feature phones use the Series 30+ platform and are all available as both single and Dual SIM models.

=== Made by Nokia (2013–2014) ===
- Nokia 108 released in 2013 is a Series 30+ based device with support for camera, video, and Bluetooth technology.
- Nokia 220 was released in 2014 with a 2.4-inch display and having Nokia Xpress browser and a GPRS data connection (2.5G).
- Nokia 225, released in 2014, is similar to the 220 but has a larger 2.8-inch display.

=== Made by Microsoft (2014–2016) ===
- Nokia 130 is a smaller device with a 1.8-inch display, also released in 2014.
- Nokia 215 was announced in January 2015. Like the 220, the 215 has a 2.4-inch display, has GPRS – EDGE connectivity, and only has a VGA camera.
- Nokia 105 (2015) is a device announced in June 2015, is the 2nd edition of the Nokia 105 (2013) with Series 30, it notably had increased storage and could store over 2.000 contacts and last 35 days on standby, and is advertised as a backup telephone for smartphone users.
- Nokia 222 is a device announced in August 2015. The differentiation from its predecessors is that it comes with Skype's GroupMe application preinstalled, supports J2ME applications.
- Nokia 230 was launched in November 2015. This device features front-facing and main camera both with LED flash.
- Nokia 216 was announced in September 2016 and released in October 2016 (first released in India and Vietnam, later in the United Kingdom in January 2017). It is identical in features to the Nokia 215 with the main difference being the front-facing camera and a slight redesign.

=== Made by HMD (2016-now) ===
- Nokia 150 was launched on 13 December 2016. It looks like a Nokia 216 but excludes a front camera and flash, uses a different processor, only has 6 ringtones in Tones, and has a matte finish around the keypad (as opposed to the glossy finish around the keypad on the Nokia 216). It still features Bluetooth but cannot access the internet.
- Nokia 3310 (2017) in 2G was announced on 26 February 2017. This was the final Series 30+ device that support J2ME applications.
- Nokia 105 (2017) was announced on 17 July 2017
- Nokia 130 (2017) was announced on 17 July 2017
- Nokia 106 (2018) was announced on 14 November 2018
- Nokia 230 (2018), without J2ME games and apps support.

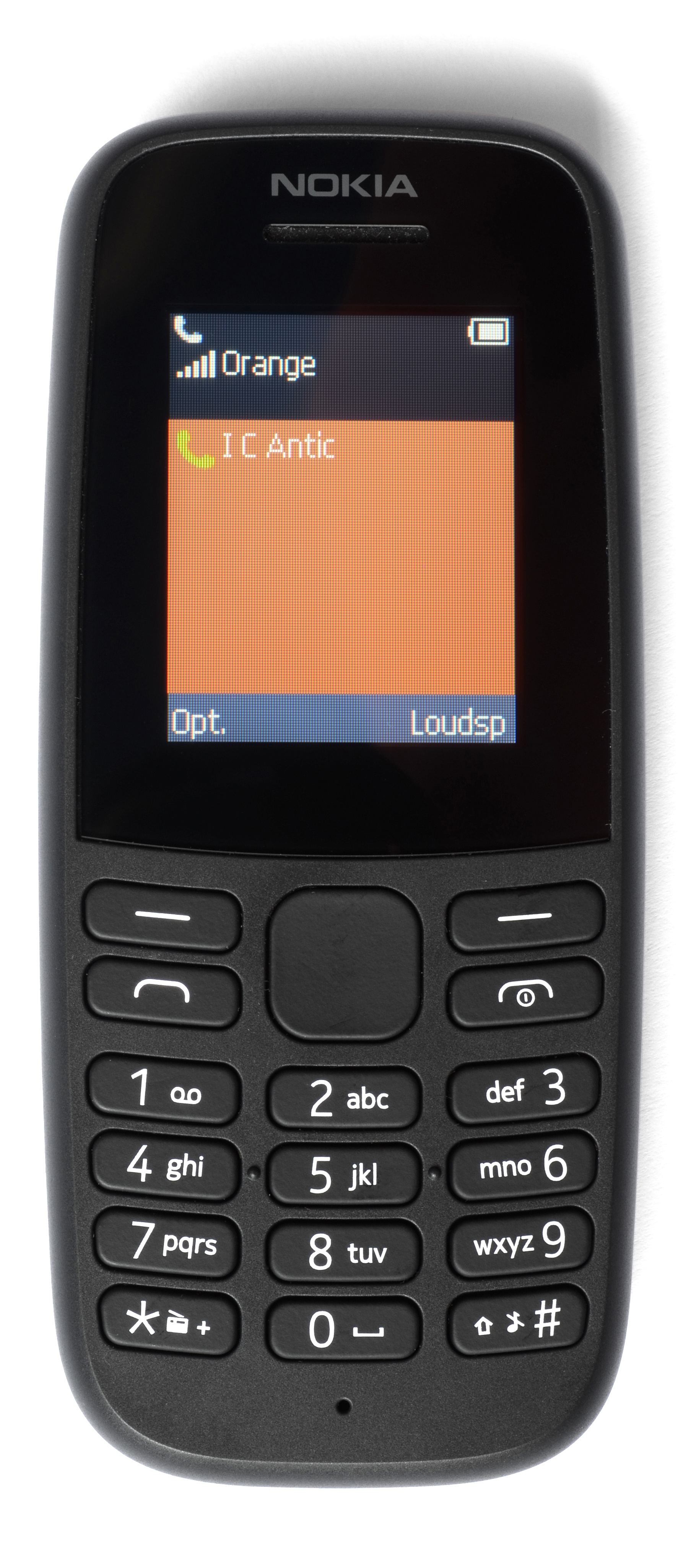
Nokia 105 (2019) running Series 30+

Since 2019, many Nokia S30+ models released with the Chinese Mocor RTOS platform (with some S30+ devices before 2021 bases on old MTK MAUI due to without 4G support):

- Nokia 3310 3G (2019), the first Series 30+ device with Mocor RTOS, also as the first S30+ device featured 3G support. Several later Nokia 3310 3G devices (manufacturing in 2019) run Series 30+ instead of Smart Feature OS in 2017 version (although both were based on Mocor RTOS), with different pre-installed games and apps instead of downloadable J2ME games and apps in Smart Feature OS.
- Nokia 105 (2019) was announced on 24 July 2019
- Nokia 210 (2019) was announced on 25 February 2019
- Nokia 220 4G (2019) was announced on 24 July 2019, the second Series 30+ with Mocor RTOS that uses a graphical user interface similar to 2019 version of Nokia 3310 3G, but without animation. First S30+ device that featured 4G support.
- Nokia 110 (2019) was announced on 5 September 2019
- Nokia 5310 (2020) was announced on 19 March 2020. This was the final Series 30+ device that support MRE applications.
- Nokia 125 was announced on 12 May 2020
- Nokia 150 (2020) was announced on 12 May 2020. This was the final Series 30+ based on old MTK MAUI software device.
- Nokia 215 4G (2020) was announced on 10 October 2020
- Nokia 225 4G (2020) was announced on 10 October 2020
- Nokia 105 4G (2021) was released on 23 May 2021
- Nokia 6310 (2021) was announced on 26 July 2021
- Nokia 105 (2022) was announced on 26 March 2022
- Nokia 110 (2022) was announced on 26 March 2022
- Nokia 105 Plus (2022) on 26 April 2022 in India
- Nokia 8210 4G (2022)
- Nokia 5710 XpressAudio (2022), which was the first phone featuring wireless Bluetooth earbuds.
- Nokia 2660 Flip (2022), the first flip with Series 30+.
- Nokia 105 Plus (2022) was announced on 1 December 2022 for China and India.

Since 2023, many S30+ devices released with IP52 water resistance, some models with IPS display, including:

- Nokia 105 (2023) with IP52 water resistant.
- Nokia 106 (2023) with IP52 water resistant.
- Nokia 106 4G (2023) in India and Russia, with IP52 water resistance. In late 2023, users in India upgraded with the latest firmware via FOTA and added Cloud Phone technology support.
- Nokia 110 (2023) in India, with IP52 water resistant.
- Nokia 130 Music, with IP52 water resistant
- Nokia 125 (2023) in China, is a rebrand of the Nokia 130 Music, IP52 water resistant
- Nokia 150 (2023) with IP52 water resistant
- Nokia 105 4G (2023) with IPS display, IP52 water resistant.
- Nokia 110 4G (2023) with IPS display, IP52 water resistant. In late 2023, users in India upgraded with the latest firmware via FOTA and added Cloud Phone technology support.
- Nokia 105 Pro 4G (2023), supports Micro-SD, IPS display, and IP52 water resistance.
- Nokia 110 Pro 4G (2023), supports Micro-SD, IPS display, and IP52 water resistance.

Several S30+ phones since 2023 also featured built-in UPI payments app for Indian users only. Since 2026, the UPI payments app was replaced by PhonePe.

Since 04/2024, many Series 30+ devices released with USB-C charging, including:

- Nokia 5310 (2024), with a design similar to the Nokia 5310 (2020) but with a larger screen at 2.8" IPS (compared to the 2.4-inch TFT of the 2020 version), and supports USB-C.
- Nokia 6310 (2024), with a design similar to the Nokia 6310 (2021), 2.8" IPS display, supports USB-C.
- Nokia 230 (2024), with a metal design similar to the Nokia 230 but with additional metal accents surrounding the external speaker, flash LED, and camera, and supports USB-C charging.
- The Boring Phone (2024), in cooperation with Heineken and Bodega, is based on the Nokia 2660 Flip, with a monochrome screen and fewer features.
- Nokia 225 4G (2024) with new design language featuring flat edges surrounding the body, IPS display and USB-C charging, and a VGA camera, featuring Cloud Phone technology support.
- Nokia 220 4G (2024) in China, India and Vietnam, with a design similar to Nokia 225 4G (2024) but without a camera, larger screen 2.8" IPS and USB-C charging. The Indian and Vietnamese version also featuring Cloud Phone technology support.
- Nokia 215 4G (2024), is a rebrand of the Nokia 220 4G 2024 in China but with a global market, featuring Cloud Phone technology support.
- Nokia 235 4G (2024), with a design similar to Nokia 225 4G (2024) but with a 2MP camera, IPS display, and USB-C, featuring Cloud Phone technology support.
- Nokia 3210 (2024), with flat design, 2MP camera, IPS display, USB-C, featuring Cloud Phone technology support.
- HMD 105 (2024), one of the first two Series 30+ devices that use HMD brand name.
- HMD 110 (2024), one of the first two Series 30+ devices that use HMD brand name.
- HMD 105 Pure/Nokia 105 Classic (2024), refreshed version of Nokia 105 (2022).
- HMD Barbie™ Phone (2024) in Europe and China, in cooperation with Mattel, is based on the Nokia 2660 Flip, with Barbie's theme design and features. The US version of this phone is based on the Nokia 2780 Flip and run KaiOS instead of Mocor RTOS, but uses the similar user interface from the Mocor RTOS version.
- HMD 105 4G (2024), 4G version of HMD 105 (2024) for many countries that no longer support 2G, featuring Cloud Phone technology support.
- HMD 110 4G (2024), 4G version of HMD 110 (2024) for many countries that no longer support 2G, featuring Cloud Phone technology support. Also have Nokia logo variant.
- Nokia 108 (2024), is a rebrand of the HMD 105 (2024).
- Nokia 108 4G (2024), is a rebrand of the HMD 105 4G (2024), featuring Cloud Phone technology support.
- Nokia 125 (2025), is a rebrand of the HMD 110 (2024).
- Nokia 125 4G (2024), is a rebrand of the HMD 110 4G (2024), featuring Cloud Phone technology support.
- HMD 150 Music (2025), rebranded version of Nokia 150.
- HMD 130 Music (2025), rebranded version of Nokia 130 Music/Nokia 125.
- HMD 2660 Flip (2025), rebranded version of Nokia 2660 Flip, featuring Cloud Phone technology support.
- HMD Barça 3210 (2025), in cooperation with FC Barcelona, is based on the Nokia 3210 (2024), with FC Barcelona's theme design and features.
- HMD 101 4G (2025), featuring Cloud Phone technology support.
- HMD 102 4G (2025), featuring Cloud Phone technology support.
- HMD Touch 4G (2025), the first touchscreen device with Series 30+. Compared to other S30+ devices, it featuring several smartphone features such as Wi-Fi, Wi-Fi hotspot, built-in Express Chat app, and Cloud Phone technology support. As a side note, the prototype version of this device was called as HMD Wonka.
- HMD 100 (2025), the ultra-basic S30+ device as it featured several downgrades compared to the other S30+ devices such as support 2G only and without camera, music player and Micro-SD. This was the first S30+ device that saw the return of Micro-USB charging since Nokia 110 Pro 4G (2023).
- HMD 101 (2026), downgrade 2G version of HMD 101 4G (2025), similar to the HMD 100 but also featured music player and Micro-SD.
- HMD 102 (2026), downgrade 2G version of HMD 102 4G (2025), similar to the HMD 100 but also featured camera, music player and Micro-SD.
- Xplora One (2026), in cooperation with Xplora, is based on the HMD Touch 4G but without social media applications due to the removed of the internet browser and Cloud Phone technology. As a side note, the prototype version of this device was called as HMD Compass.
- Nokia 110 Power (2026), first Nokia-branded S30+ device since Nokia has extended its licensing agreement with HMD by another two to three years beyond the original 2026 expiration.
- Nokia 200 4G (2026), featured video call and a social media app called HMD Micro Chat (in China) or Xpress Chat (in global). The global version also featured voice assistant.
- Nokia 210 4G (2026), which was a upgraded of Nokia 200 4G with the addition of camera, build-in payment app and voice assistant.
- Nokia 215 4G 2nd Edition (2026), also known as Nokia 215 Chat in Thailand only, which was a upgraded of Nokia 215 4G (2024), featured Xpress Chat, voice assistant and video call. The Cloud Phone technology was also upgraded.
- Nokia 235 4G 2nd Edition (2026), which was a upgraded of Nokia 235 4G (2024), featured Xpress Chat, voice assistant and video call. The Cloud Phone technology was also upgraded.
- Nokia 123 Shield (2026), the first S30+ device with touch design. It was also as the first device that featured new build-in PhonePe payment app, which replaced the build-in UPI payment app.
- HMD Touch AI (2026), Chinese version of HMD Touch 4G, featured many Chinese applications such as ByteDance’s Doubao AI chatbot and Alipay payment.
- Nokia 300 Charge (2026), the first S30+ device that featured power bank mode thanks to the largest battery compared to other S30+ devices (3700 mAh).
- Nokia 125 4G 2nd Edition (2026), which was a upgraded of Nokia 125 4G (2024), featured Xpress Chat, voice assistant and video call. The Cloud Phone technology was also upgraded.

Several S30+ phones since 2025 also featured built-in DeepSeek chatbot app for Chinese users only. Since 2026, several S30+ phones also featured build-in chatbot app called Sikey AI for international users.

== Multimedia support ==
Maximum accepted video resolution is 854×480.

- Accepted video containers: AVI, MP4, 3GP, and 3G2.
- Accepted video codecs: DivX 4, DivX 5, Xvid, H.263, and MJPEG.
- Accepted audio containers and codecs: MP3, WAV (PCM and ADPCM variants only), AAC, AAC+ (poor), eAAC+ (poor), AMR-NB, MIDI (no larger than 20 KB for old versions)
- Accepted photo formats: JPEG, GIF, PNG, BMP

== See also ==
- Series 20
- Series 30
- Series 40
- Series 60
- Series 80
- Series 90
