= List of Nokia products =

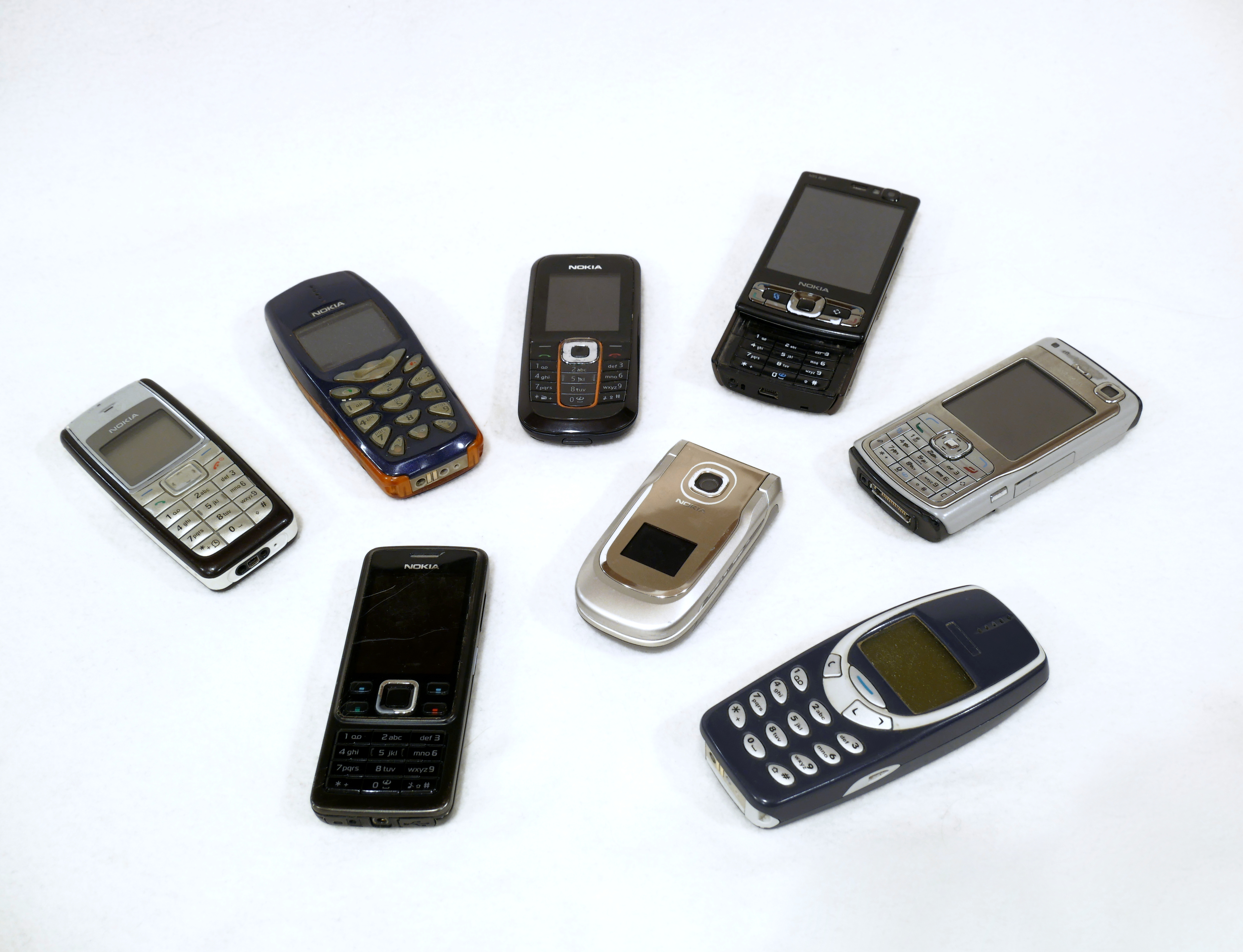
Various Nokia phones from the early to mid-2000s

The following is a list of products branded by Nokia.

== Current products and services ==
=== Products by Nokia Technologies ===
==== Watches ====
- Nokia 8580 pocket watch (NP-240005). Release Year: 2002.

Chrome clamshell- style luxury design. Batteries needs: CR2025 and LR1130

==== Wi-Fi routers ====
- Nokia Wi-Fi Beacon 1
- Nokia Wi-Fi Beacon 3

==== Digital audio ====
- Nokia OZO Audio

==== Smart TVs ====
Nokia markets smart TVs that run on Android TV.

- Nokia Smart TV 55 inch
- Nokia Smart TV 43 inch

=== Products by Nokia Networks ===
Nokia Networks is a multinational data networking and telecommunications equipment company headquartered in Espoo, Finland and wholly owned subsidiary of Nokia Corporation.

=== HMD Global products ===
HMD develops mobile devices under the Nokia brand since 2016. The company has signed an exclusive deal with Nokia allowing it to use the Nokia brand for its devices. All Nokia branded devices made by HMD are listed in the article linked above.

== Past products and services ==
=== Mobile phones ===
Note:

- Phones in boldface are smartphones
- Status: D = discontinued; P = in production; C = cancelled
- DCT1-DCT4 = Nokia Digital Core Technology
- BB5.0 = Base Band 5 – Successor to DCT
- KaiOS = Mobile Linux distribution for keypad feature phones
- S60 = Software platform for smartphones

==== The Mobira/Nokia series (1982–1990) ====
The earliest phones produced by Nokia. These all use 1G networks.

Phone model	Screen type	Released	Status	Technology	Generation	Form factor
Mobira Senator	Monochrome	1982 January	D	NMT-450	Unknown	Car phone
Nokia Actionman	Monochrome	1984 January	D	NMT-450	Unknown	Car phone
Nokia Actionman II	Monochrome	1984 May	D	NMT-450	Unknown	Car phone
Nokia Talkman 320F	Monochrome	1984 August	D	NMT-450	Unknown	Car phone
Nokia Talkman 520	Monochrome	1984 October	D	NMT-450	Unknown	Portable Phone
Nokia Talkman 620	Monochrome	1992 ?	D	NMT-450	Unknown	Portable Phone
Nokia Mobira Talkman	Monochrome	1985 May	D	NMT-450	Unknown	Car phone
Mobira Talkman 450	Monochrome	1985	D	NMT-450	Unknown	Brick
Mobira Talkman 900	Monochrome	1987	D	NMT-900	Unknown	Brick
Nokia Talkman 510	Monochrome	1989	D	NMT-450	Unknown	Brick
Nokia Cityman 100	Monochrome	1990	D	ETACS	Unknown	Brick
Nokia Cityman 190	Monochrome	1990	D	ETACS	Unknown	Brick
Mobira Cityman 150	Monochrome	1989	D	NMT-900	Unknown	Brick
SIP/Nokia Cityman 300	Monochrome	1992	D	TACS	Unknown	Brick
Mobira Cityman 900	Monochrome	1987	D	NMT-900	Unknown	Brick
Mobira/Nokia Cityman 1320	Monochrome	1987	D	TACS	Unknown	Brick

==== Original series (1992–2003) ====
Including the last 1G phones by Nokia.

Phone model	Screen type	Released	Status	Technology	Chipset, HW platform	Form factor
Nokia 100	Monochrome	1993	D	AMPS/ETACS	Unknown	Bar
Nokia 101	Monochrome	1992	D	AMPS/ETACS	Unknown	Bar
Nokia 104	Monochrome	1992	D	AMPS	Unknown	Bar
Nokia 105	Monochrome	1993	D	AMPS	Unknown	Bar
Nokia 107	Monochrome	1992	D	AMPS	Unknown	Bar
Nokia 116	Monochrome	1992	D	Unknown	Unknown	Bar
Nokia 121	Monochrome	1992	D	TACS/ETACS/NMT-450	Unknown	Bar
Nokia 130	Monochrome	1993	D	Unknown	Unknown	Bar
Nokia 150	Monochrome	1993	D	NMT-450	Unknown	Bar
Nokia 180	Monochrome	1993	D	Unknown	Unknown	Bar
Nokia 191	Monochrome	1992	D	AMPS	Unknown	Bar
Nokia 203	Monochrome	1995	D	ETACS	Unknown	Bar
Nokia 211	Monochrome	1992	D	AMPS	Unknown	Bar
Nokia 232	Monochrome	1994	D	AMPS/TACS	Unknown	Bar
Nokia 239	Monochrome	1994	D	AMPS	Unknown	Flip
Nokia 250	Monochrome	1995	D	NMT-450	Unknown	Bar
Nokia 252	Monochrome	1998	D	AMPS/N-AMPS	Unknown	Bar
Nokia 282	Monochrome	1998	D	AMPS/N-AMPS	Unknown	Flip
Nokia 340	Monochrome	1995	D	Unknown	Unknown	Bar
Nokia 350	Monochrome	1995	D	NMT-450	Unknown	Bar
Nokia 450	Monochrome	1996	D	NMT-450	Unknown	Bar
Nokia 540	Monochrome	1997	D	NMT-450	Unknown	Bar
Nokia 550	Monochrome	1997	D	NMT-450	Unknown	Bar
Nokia 636	Monochrome	1995	D	AMPS	Unknown	Bar
Nokia 638	Monochrome	1996	D	AMPS	Unknown	Bar
Nokia 640	Monochrome	1999	D	NMT-450	Unknown	Bar
Nokia 650	Monochrome	1998	D	NMT-450	Unknown	Bar
Nokia 810 (car phone)	Monochrome	2003	D	GSM	Unknown	Car phone
Nokia 909	Monochrome	1995	D	ETACS	Unknown	Bar
Nokia 918	Monochrome	1996	D	AMPS	Unknown	Bar
Nokia 1000	Monochrome	1992	D	AMPS/ETACS/TACS	DCT1	Bar
Nokia Family Link	Monochrome	1992	D	ETACS	Unknown	Bar
Nokia Ringo	Monochrome	1995	D	NMT-900	DCT1	Bar
Nokia Ringo 2	Monochrome	1997	D	ETACS	DCT1	Bar
Nokia Ringo 3	Monochrome	1998	D	ETACS	DCT1	Bar
Nokia D.I.N.O	Monochrome	1996	D	TDMA/AMPS	DCT1	Bar

==== 4-digit series ====
===== Nokia 1xxx (1992–2010) =====
The Nokia 1000 series was previously referred to as the 'Ultrabasic' offering. It included Nokia's most affordable phones with 2G network. They are mostly targeted towards developing countries and users who do not require advanced features beyond making calls and SMS text messages, alarm clock, calendar, and reminders. Several later models of the 1000 series features an FM radio and a built-in LED flashlight.

The 1000 series traditionally lacks cameras, with the exception of Nokia 1680 classic being the only one in the lineup to feature a camera.

Most phones released after 2002 and based on the DCT4 platform, used the Series 30 software platform.

Phone model	Screen type	Released	Status	Technology	Platform	Chipset, HW platform	Form factor	Camera	Notes
Nokia 1006	128x160px 18-bit (262,144) Color	2009	D	CDMA		Qualcomm QSC6055	Bar	None	
Nokia 1011	Monochrome alphanumeric	1992	D	GSM		Unknown, DCT1	Bar	None	First GSM phone
Nokia 1100	96x65 Monochrome	2003	D	GSM	Series 30	Nokia UPP2M, DCT4	Bar	None	best-selling phone along with 1110
Nokia 1101	96x65 Monochrome	2005	D	GSM	Series 30	Nokia UPP2M, DCT4	Bar	None	
Nokia 1108	96x65 Monochrome	2005	D	GSM	Series 30	Nokia UPP2M, DCT4	Bar	None	
Nokia 1110	96x68 Monochrome	2005	D	GSM	Series 30	Nokia UPP4M, DCT4	Bar	None	best-selling phone along with 1100
Nokia 1110i	96x68 Inverse Monochrome	2006	D	GSM	Series 30	Nokia UPP4M, DCT4	Bar	None	
Nokia 1112	96x68 Monochrome	2006	D	GSM	Series 30	Nokia UPP4M, DCT4	Bar	None	
Nokia 1116	96x68 Monochrome	2006	D	GSM	Series 30	Nokia UPP4M, DCT4	Bar	None	
Nokia 1200	96x68 Monochrome	2007	D	GSM	Series 30	Nokia UPPCosto, BB4.1	Bar	None	
Nokia 1202	96x68 Monochrome	2009	D	GSM	Series 30	Infineon, DCT4+	Bar	None	
Nokia 1203	96x68 Monochrome	2009	D	GSM	Series 30	Infineon, DCT4+	Bar	None	
Nokia 1207	96x68 16-bit (65,536) Color	2007	D	GSM	Series 30	Unknown, DCT4+	Bar	None	
Nokia 1208	96x68 16-bit (65,536) Color	2008	D	GSM	Series 30	Nokia UPPCosto, BB4.1 (DCT4+)	Bar	None	
Nokia 1209	96x68 16-bit (65,536) Color	2008	D	GSM	Series 30	Nokia UPPCosto, BB4.1 (DCT4+)	Bar	None	
Nokia 1220	84x48 Monochrome	2002	D	TDMA/AMPS	Series 30	Unknown, DCT4	Bar	None	
Nokia 1221	84x48 Monochrome	2003	D	TDMA/AMPS	Series 30	Unknown, DCT4	Bar	None	
Nokia 1255	96x65 Monochrome	2005	D	CDMA	Series 30	Qualcomm MSM6000	Bar	None	
Nokia 1260	84x48 Monochrome	2002	D	TDMA/AMPS	Series 30	Unknown, DCT4	Bar	None	
Nokia 1261	84x48 Monochrome	2003	D	TDMA/AMPS	Series 30	Unknown, DCT4	Bar	None	
Nokia 1265	96x64 Monochrome	2006	D	CDMA		Qualcomm QSC6010	Bar	None	
Nokia 1280	96x68 Monochrome	2010	D	GSM	Series 30	Infineon X-GOLD 110 PMB7900, DCT4+	Bar	None	
Nokia 1282	96x68 Monochrome	2010	D	GSM	Series 30	Infineon X-GOLD 110 PMB7900, DCT4+	Bar	None	
Nokia 1315	96x64 12-bit (4096) Color	2006	D	CDMA		Qualcomm MSM6000	Bar	None	
Nokia 1325	96x64 16-bit (65,536) Color	2006	D	CDMA		Qualcomm QSC6010	Bar	None	
Nokia 1506	96x64 16-bit (65,536) Color	2009	D	CDMA		VIA Telecom CBP5.0	Bar	None	
Nokia 1508	96x64 16-bit (65,536) Color	2008	D	CDMA		VIA Telecom CBP5.0	Bar	None	
Nokia 1508i	96x64 16-bit (65,536) Color	2008	D	CDMA		VIA Telecom CBP5.0	Bar	None	
Nokia 1600	96x68 16-bit (65,536) Color	2005	D	GSM	Series 30	Nokia UPP2M, DCT4	Bar	None	
Nokia 1606	128x160 18-bit (262,144) Color	2008	D	CDMA		Unknown	Flip	None	
Nokia 1610	Monochrome alphanumeric	1996	D	GSM		Hitachi H8, DCT1	Bar	None	
Nokia 1610 Plus	Monochrome alphanumeric	1997	D	GSM		Hitachi H8, DCT1	Bar	None	
Nokia 1611	Monochrome alphanumeric	1997	D	GSM		Hitachi H8, DCT1	Bar	None	
Nokia 1616	128x160 (65,536) Color	2010	D	GSM	Series 30	Infineon X-GOLD 110 PMB7900, DCT4+	Bar	None	
Nokia 1618	128x160 (65,536) Color	2010	D	GSM	Series 30	Infineon X-GOLD 110 PMB7900, DCT4+	Bar	None	
Nokia 1620	Monochrome	1997	D	GSM		Hitachi H8, DCT1	Bar	None	
Nokia 1630	Monochrome	1998	D	GSM		Hitachi H8, DCT1	Bar	None	
Nokia 1631	Monochrome	1998	D	GSM		Hitachi H8, DCT1	Bar	None	
Nokia 1650	128x160 (65,536) Color	2007	D	GSM	Series 30	Nokia UPPCosto, BB4.1 (DCT4+)	Bar	None	
Nokia 1661	128x160 (65,536) Color	2009	D	GSM	Series 30	Infineon X-GOLD 110 PMB7900, DCT4+	Bar	None	
Nokia 1662	128x160 (65,536) Color	2009	D	GSM	Series 30	Infineon X-GOLD 110 PMB7900, DCT4+	Bar	None	
Nokia 1680 classic	128x160 (65,536) Color	2008	D	GSM	S40 5th Edition	Nokia UPP8M, DCT4+	Bar	VGA 0.3 MP	
Nokia 1681 classic	128x160 (65,536) Color	2008	D	GSM	S40 5th Edition	Nokia UPP8M, DCT4+	Bar	None	
Nokia 1682 classic	128x160 (65,536) Color	2008	D	GSM	S40 5th Edition	Nokia UPP8M, DCT4+	Bar	None	
Nokia 1800	128x160 (65,536) Color	2010	D	GSM	Series 30	Infineon X-GOLD 110 PMB7900, DCT4+	Bar	None	

===== Nokia 2xxx (1994–2010, 2019–2022) =====
Previously marketed as the 'Basic' line. Like the 1000 series, the 2000 series are entry-level phones. However, the 2000 series generally contain more advanced features than the 1000 series, with many featuring color screens. Several newer models included camera, Bluetooth, microSD card slot, and even GPS, such as in the case of the Nokia 2710.

Phone model	Screen type	Released	Status	Technology	Chipset, HW platform	Form factor	Camera	Notes
Nokia 2010	Monochrome	1994	D	GSM	Unknown, DCT1	Bar	None	
Nokia 2100	Monochrome	2003	D	GSM	Nokia MAD2WD1, DCT3	Bar	None	
Nokia 2110	Monochrome alphanumeric 4x13	1994	D	GSM	Hitachi H8/536, DCT1	Bar	None	
Nokia 2110i	Monochrome alphanumeric 4x13	1995	D	GSM	Hitachi H8/536, DCT1	Bar	None	
Nokia 2112	96x65 Monochrome	2004	D	CDMA	Unknown, DCT4	Bar	None	
Nokia 2115	96x65 Monochrome	2005	D	CDMA	Nokia UPP8M, DCT4	Bar	None	
Nokia 2115i	96x65 Monochrome	2005	D	CDMA	Nokia UPP8M, DCT4	Bar	None	
Nokia 2116	96x65 Monochrome	2005	D	CDMA	Nokia UPP8M, DCT4	Bar	None	
Nokia 2116i	96x65 Monochrome	2005	D	CDMA	Nokia UPP8M, DCT4	Bar	None	
Nokia 2118	96x65 Monochrome	2005	D	CDMA	Nokia UPP8M, DCT4	Bar	None	
Nokia 2120	Monochrome	1995	D	TDMA/AMPS	Hitachi H8/536, DCT1	Bar	None	
Nokia 2120 Plus	Monochrome	1996	D	TDMA/AMPS	Hitachi H8/536, DCT1	Bar	None	
Nokia 2125	96x65 16-bit (65,536) Color	2005	D	CDMA	Unknown, DCT4	Bar	None	
Nokia 2125i	96x65 16-bit (65,536) Color	2005	D	CDMA/AMPS	Unknown, DCT4	Bar	None	
Nokia 2126	96x65 16-bit (65,536) Color	2005	D	CDMA	Unknown, DCT4	Bar	None	
Nokia 2126i	96x65 16-bit (65,536) Color	2005	D	CDMA	Unknown, DCT4	Bar	None	
Nokia 2128	96x65 16-bit (65,536) Color	2005	D	CDMA	Unknown, DCT4	Bar	None	
Nokia 2128i	96x65 16-bit (65,536) Color	2005	D	CDMA	Unknown, DCT4	Bar	None	
Nokia 2135	96x65 24-bit (16M) Color	2007	D	CDMA	Qualcomm MSM6125	Bar	None	
Nokia 2140	Monochrome	1995	D	GSM	Hitachi H8/536, DCT1	Bar	None	
Nokia 2146	Monochrome	1994	D	GSM	Hitachi H8/536, DCT1	Bar	None	
Nokia 2148	Monochrome	1995	D	GSM	Hitachi H8/536, DCT1	Bar	None	
Nokia 2148i	Monochrome	1995	D	GSM	Hitachi H8/536, DCT1	Bar	None	
Nokia 2160	Monochrome	1996	D	TDMA/AMPS	Hitachi H8/536, DCT1	Bar	None	
Nokia 2160i	Monochrome	1997	D	TDMA/AMPS	Hitachi H8/536, DCT1	Bar	None	
Nokia 2168	Monochrome	1997	D	TDMA/AMPS	Hitachi H8/536, DCT1	Bar	None	
Nokia 2170	Monochrome	1998	D	CDMA	Hitachi H8/536, DCT1	Bar	None	
Nokia 2180	Monochrome	1997	D	CDMA/AMPS	Hitachi H8/536, DCT1	Bar	None	
Nokia 2190	Monochrome	1997	D	GSM	Hitachi H8/536, DCT1	Bar	None	
Nokia 2220	84x48 Monochrome	2003	D	TDMA/AMPS	Nokia UPP8M, DCT4	Bar	None	Exclusive only to Canadian Market
Nokia 2220 slide	128x160 16-bit (65,536) Color	2010	D	GSM	Nokia UPP8M, DCT4	Slider	VGA 0.3 MP	
Nokia 2228	240x320 18-bit (262,144) Color	2009	D	CDMA	Qualcomm QSC6080	Bar	1.3 MP	
Nokia 2255	128x128 16-bit (65,536) Color	2005	D	CDMA	Unknown	Flip	None	
Nokia 2260	84x48 Monochrome	2003	D	TDMA/AMPS	Nokia UPP8M, DCT4	Bar	None	Exclusive only to American Market
Nokia 2270	96x65 Monochrome	2003	D	CDMA	Nokia UPP8M, DCT4	Bar	None	
Nokia 2272	96x65 Monochrome	2006	D	CDMA/GSM	Nokia UPP8M, DCT4	Bar	None	
Nokia 2275	96x65 Monochrome	2003	D	CDMA	Nokia UPP8M, DCT4	Bar	None	
Nokia 2280	96x65 Monochrome	2003	D	CDMA	Nokia UPP8M, DCT4	Bar	None	
Nokia 2285	96x65 Monochrome	2003	D	CDMA	Nokia UPP8M, DCT4	Bar	None	
Nokia 2300	96x65 Monochrome	2003	D	GSM	Nokia UPP8M, DCT4	Bar	None	
Nokia 2310	96x68 16-bit (65,536) Color	2006	D	GSM	Nokia UPP2M, DCT4+	Bar	None	
Nokia 2320 classic	128x160 16-bit (65,536) Color	2009	D	GSM	Nokia UPP2M, DCT4+	Bar	None	
Nokia 2322 classic	128x160 16-bit (65,536) Color	2009	D	GSM	Nokia UPP2M, DCT4+	Bar	None	
Nokia 2323 classic	128x160 16-bit (65,536) Color	2009	D	GSM	Nokia UPP2M, DCT4+	Bar	None	
Nokia 2330 classic	128x160 16-bit (65,536) Color	2009	D	GSM	Nokia UPP2M, DCT4+	Bar	VGA 0.3 MP	
Nokia 2365	128x160 16-bit (65,536) Color	2006	D	CDMA	Unknown	Flip	None	
Nokia 2365i	128x160 16-bit (65,536) Color	2006	D	CDMA	Unknown	Flip	None	
Nokia 2366	128x160 16-bit (65,536) Color	2006	D	CDMA	Unknown	Flip	None	
Nokia 2366i	128x160 16-bit (65,536) Color	2006	D	CDMA	Unknown	Flip	None	
Nokia 2505	128x160 16-bit (65,536) Color	2007	D	CDMA	Qualcomm QSC6010	Flip	None	
Nokia 2600	128x128 12-bit (4096) Color	2004	D	GSM	Nokia UPP8M, DCT4	Bar	None	
Nokia 2600 classic	128x160 16-bit (65,536) Color	2008	D	GSM	Nokia UPP8M, DCT4+	Bar	VGA 0.3 MP	
Nokia 2605 Mirage	128x160 18-bit (262,144) Color	2008	D	CDMA	Unknown	Flip	VGA 0.3 MP	
Nokia 2608	128x160 18-bit (262,144) Color	2009	D	CDMA	Qualcomm QSC6020	Flip	None	
Nokia 2610	128x128 16-bit (65,536) Color	2006	D	GSM	Nokia UPP4M, DCT4+	Bar	None	
Nokia 2626	128x128 16-bit (65,536) Color	2006	D	GSM	Nokia UPP4M, DCT4+	Bar	None	
Nokia 2630	128x160 16-bit (65,536) Color	2007	D	GSM	Nokia UPP4M, DCT4+	Bar	VGA 0.3 MP	
Nokia 2650	128x128 12-bit (4096) Color	2004	D	GSM	Nokia UPP8M, DCT4	Flip	None	
Nokia 2651	128x128 12-bit (4096) Color	2004	D	GSM	Nokia UPP8M, DCT4	Flip	None	
Nokia 2652	128x128 12-bit (4096) Color	2005	D	GSM	Nokia UPP8M, DCT4	Flip	None	
Nokia 2660	128x160 16-bit (65,536) Color	2007	D	EGSM	Nokia UPP8M, DCT4+	Flip	None	
Nokia 2660 Flip	240x320 24-bit (16M) Color	2022	P	GSM/HSPA/LTE	Unisoc T107	Flip	0.3 MP	
Nokia 2680 slide	128x160 16-bit (65,536) Color	2008	D	GSM	Nokia UPP8M, DCT4+	Slider	VGA 0.3 MP	
Nokia 2690	128x160 18-bit (262,144) Color	2010	D	GSM	Nokia RAPGSM, BB5.0	Bar	VGA 0.3 MP	
Nokia 2692	128x160 18-bit (262,144) Color	2010	D	GSM	Nokia RAPGSM, BB5.0	Bar	VGA 0.3 MP	
Nokia 2700 classic	240x320 18-bit (262,144) Color	2009	D	GSM, EDGE	Nokia RAPGSM, BB5.0	Bar	2.0 MP	
Nokia 2705 Shade	128x160 18-bit (262,144) Color	2009	D	CDMA	Qualcomm QSC6055	Flip	1.3 MP	
Nokia 2710 Navigation Edition	240x320 18-bit (262,144) Color	2009	D	GSM, EDGE	Broadcom BCM21351, BB5.0	Bar	2.0 MP	
Nokia 2720 fold	128x160 16-bit (65,536) Color	2009	D	GSM	Nokia UPP8M, BB5.0	Flip	1.3 MP	
Nokia 2720 Flip	240x320 24-bit (16M) Color	2019	D	GSM, HSPA, LTE	Qualcomm MSM8905 Snapdragon 205	Flip	2.0 MP	
Nokia 2730 classic	240x320 18-bit (262,144) Color	2009	D	GSM, EDGE, UMTS	Nokia RAP3GS, BB5.0	Bar	2.0 MP	
Nokia 2760	128x160 16-bit (65,536) Color	2007	D	GSM	Nokia UPP8M, DCT4+	Flip	VGA 0.3 MP	
Nokia 2760 Flip	240x320 24-bit (16M) Color	2022	P	GSM, HSPA, LTE	Unknown	Flip	5.0 MP	
Nokia 2780 Flip	240x320 24-bit (16M) Color	2022	P	GSM, HSPA, LTE	Qualcomm QM215 Snapdragon 215	Flip	5.0 MP	
Nokia 2855	128x160 18-bit (262,144) Color	2006	D	CDMA/AMPS	Unknown	Flip	None	
Nokia 2855i	128x160 18-bit (262,144) Color	2006	D	CDMA/AMPS	Unknown	Flip	None	
Nokia 2865	128x160 18-bit (262,144) Color	2006	D	CDMA	Nokia TIKU, DCT4.5	Bar	None	
Nokia 2865i	128x160 18-bit (262,144) Color	2006	D	CDMA	Nokia TIKU, DCT4.5	Bar	None	
Nokia 2875	128x160 18-bit (262,144) Color	2006	D	CDMA	Nokia TIKU, DCT4.5	Bar	1.3 MP	

===== Nokia 3xxx (1997–2009, 2017–present) =====
The Nokia 3000 series was originally referred to as the 'Expression' line. They were originally mostly mid-range phones targeted towards the youth market. Many of these models included visually attractive designs to appeal to the younger demographic, unlike the 6000-series which were more conservatively styled to appeal to business users, and the 7000-series which targeted the fashion-conscious.

Phone model	Screen type	Released	Status	Technology	Chipset, HW platform	Form factor	Camera	Notes
Nokia 3100	128x128 12-bit (4096) Color	2003	D	GSM	Nokia UPP8M, DCT4	Bar	None	
Nokia 3105	128x128 12-bit (4096) Color	2003	D	CDMA	Nokia UPP8M, DCT4	Bar	None	
Nokia 3108	128x128 12-bit (4096) Color	2003	D	GSM	Nokia UPP8M, DCT4	Bar	None	
Nokia 3109 classic	128x160 18-bit (262,144)	2007	D	GSM/EDGE/HSCSD	Nokia RAPGSM, BB5.0	Bar	None	
Nokia 3110	83x41 + icons Monochrome	1997	D	GSM	Unknown, DCT2	Bar	None	
Nokia 3110 classic	128x160 18-bit (262,144)	2007	D	GSM/EDGE/HSCSD	Nokia RAPGSM, BB5.0	Bar	1.3 MP	
Nokia 3110 Evolve	128x160 18-bit (262,144)	2008	D	GSM/EDGE/HSCSD	Nokia RAPGSM, BB5.0	Bar	1.3 MP	
Nokia 3120	128x128 12-bit (4096) Color	2004	D	GSM	Nokia UPP8M, DCT4	Bar	None	
Nokia 3120 classic	240x320 (16M) Color	2008	D	WCDMA/GSM	Nokia RAP3GS, BB5.0	Bar	2.0 MP	
Nokia 3125	128x128 12-bit (4096) Color	2004	D	CDMA	Nokia UPP8M, DCT4	Bar	None	
Nokia 3128	128x160 18-bit (65,536) Color; 96x64 16-bit (4,096) Color (external)	2004	D	GSM	Unknown, DCT4	Flip	None	Exclusive only to Chinese Market
Nokia 3129	128x160 18-bit (65,536) Color; 96x64 16-bit (4,096) Color (external)	2004	D	GSM	Unknown, DCT4	Flip	None	Exclusive only to Chinese Market
Nokia 3152	128x160 18-bit (262,144) Color; 96x65 Monochrome (external)	2005	D	CDMA	Nokia TIKUEDGE, DCT4.5	Flip	None	
Nokia 3155	128x160 18-bit (262,144) Color; 96x65 Monochrome (external)	2005	D	CDMA	Nokia TIKUEDGE, DCT4.5	Flip	None	
Nokia 3155i	128x160 18-bit (262,144) Color; 96x65 Monochrome (external)	2005	D	CDMA	Nokia TIKUEDGE, DCT4.5	Flip	None	
Nokia 3200	128x128 12-bit (4096) Color	2003	D	GSM	Nokia UPP8M, DCT4	Bar	0.1 MP	
Nokia 3205	128x128 12-bit (4096) Color	2004	D	CDMA/AMPS	Nokia UPP8M, DCT4	Bar	0.3 MP	
Nokia 3208 classic	240x320 18-bit (262,144) Color	2009	D	GSM	Nokia RAPGSM, BB5.0	Bar	2.0 MP	
Nokia 3210	84x48 Monochrome	1999	D	GSM	Texas Instruments MAD2PR1, DCT3	Bar	None	
Nokia 3210 (2024)	320x240 24-bit (16M) Color	2024	P	LTE/HSPA/GSM	Unisoc T107	Bar	2.0 MP	
Nokia 3220	128x128 16-bit (65,536) Color	2004	D	GSM	Nokia UPP8M, DCT4	Bar	VGA 0.3 MP	
**Nokia 3230**	176x208 16-bit (65,536) Color	2005	D	GSM	Nokia UPP_WD2, DCT4	Bar	1.3 MP	
**Nokia 3250**	176x208 18-bit (262,144) Color	2005	D	GSM	Nokia RAPGSM, BB5.0	Swivel	2.0 MP	
**Nokia 3250 XpressMusic**	176x208 18-bit (262,144) Color	2006	D	GSM	Nokia RAPGSM, BB5.0	Swivel	2.0 MP	
Nokia 3280	84x48 Monochrome	2001	D	CDMA/AMPS	Unknown, DCT3	Bar	None	
Nokia 3285	84x48 Monochrome	2001	D	CDMA/AMPS	Unknown, DCT3	Bar	None	
Nokia 3300	128x128 12-bit (4096) Color	2003	D	GSM	Nokia UPP8M, DCT4	Bar	None	
Nokia 3310	84x48 Monochrome	2000	D	GSM	Texas Instruments MAD2WD1, DCT3	Bar	None	
Nokia 3310 (2017)	240x320 18-bit (262,144) Color	2017	D	GSM	MediaTek MT6260CA	Bar	2.0 MP	
Nokia 3310 3G	240x320 18-bit (262,144) Color	2017	D	GSM/HSPA	Spreadtrum SC7701B	Bar	2.0 MP	
Nokia 3310 4G	240x320 18-bit (262,144) Color	2017	D	GSM/HSPA/LTE	Spreadtrum SC9820	Bar	2.0 MP	
Nokia 3315	84x48 Monochrome	2002	D	GSM	Texas Instruments MAD2WD1, DCT3	Bar	None	
Nokia 3320	84x48 Monochrome	2001	D	TDMA/AMPS	Texas Instruments MAD2WD1, DCT3	Bar	None	
Nokia 3330	84x48 Monochrome	2001	D	GSM	Texas Instruments MAD2WD1, DCT3	Bar	None	
Nokia 3350	96x65 Monochrome	2001	D	GSM	Texas Instruments MAD2WD1, DCT3	Bar	None	
Nokia 3360	84x48 Monochrome	2002	D	TDMA/AMPS	Texas Instruments MAD2WD1, DCT3	Bar	None	
Nokia 3390	84x48 Monochrome	2001	D	GSM	Texas Instruments MAD2WD1, DCT3	Bar	None	
Nokia 3395	84x48 Monochrome	2002	D	GSM	Texas Instruments MAD2WD1, DCT3	Bar	None	
Nokia 3410	96x65 Monochrome	2002	D	GSM	Texas Instruments MAD2WD1, DCT3	Bar	None	
Nokia 3500 classic	128x160 18-bit (262,144) Color	2007	D	GSM/EDGE	Nokia RAPGSM, BB5.0	Bar	2.0 MP	
Nokia 3510	96x65 Monochrome	2002	D	GSM	Nokia UPP8M, DCT4	Bar	None	
Nokia 3510i	96x65 12-bit (4096) Color	2002	D	GSM	Nokia UPP8M, DCT4	Bar	None	
Nokia 3520	96x65 12-bit (4096) Color	2004	D	TDMA/AMPS	Nokia UPP8M, DCT4	Bar	None	
Nokia 3530	96x65 12-bit (4096) Color	2003	D	GSM	Nokia UPP8M, DCT4	Bar	None	
Nokia 3555	128x160 18-bit (262,144) Color	2008	D	GSM/WCDMA EGPRS HSCSD	Unknown	Flip	VGA 0.3 MP	
Nokia 3560	96x65 12-bit (4096) Color	2003	D	TDMA/AMPS	Nokia UPP8M, DCT4	Bar	None	
Nokia 3570	96x65 Monochrome	2003	D	CDMA	Nokia UPP8M, DCT4	Bar	None	
Nokia 3585	96x65 Monochrome	2002	D	CDMA/AMPS	Nokia UPP8M, DCT4	Bar	None	
Nokia 3585i	96x65 Monochrome	2003	D	CDMA/AMPS	Nokia UPP8M, DCT4	Bar	None	
Nokia 3586	96x65 12-bit (4096) Color	2003	D	CDMA/AMPS	Nokia UPP8M, DCT4	Bar	None	
Nokia 3586i	96x65 12-bit (4096) Color	2003	D	CDMA/AMPS	Nokia UPP8M, DCT4	Bar	None	
Nokia 3587	96x65 12-bit (4096) Color	2003	D	CDMA/AMPS	Nokia UPP8M, DCT4	Bar	None	
Nokia 3587i	96x65 12-bit (4096) Color	2003	D	CDMA/AMPS	Nokia UPP8M, DCT4	Bar	None	
Nokia 3588i	96x65 12-bit (4096) Color	2003	D	CDMA/AMPS	Nokia UPP8M, DCT4	Bar	None	
Nokia 3589i	96x65 12-bit (4096) Color	2003	D	CDMA/AMPS	Nokia UPP8M, DCT4	Bar	None	
Nokia 3590	96x65 Monochrome	2003	D	GSM	Nokia UPP8M, DCT4	Bar	None	
Nokia 3595	96x65 12-bit (4096) Color	2003	D	GSM	Nokia UPP8M, DCT4	Bar	None	
**Nokia 3600**	176x208 12-bit (4096) Color	2003	D	GSM	Nokia UPP_WD2, DCT4	Bar	VGA 0.3 MP	
Nokia 3600 slide	240x320 24-bit (16M) Color	2008	D	GSM	Nokia RAP3GS, BB5.0	Slider	3.2 MP	
Nokia 3602 slide	240x320 16-bit (65,536) Color	2008	D	GSM/HSPA	Nokia RAP3GS, BB5.0	Slider	3.2 MP	
Nokia 3606	176x220 18-bit (262,144) Color	2008	D	CDMA	Unknown	Flip	1.3 MP	
Nokia 3608	176x220 18-bit (262,144) Color	2008	D	CDMA	Unknown	Flip	1.3 MP	
Nokia 3610	96x65 Monochrome	2002	D	GSM	Texas Instruments MAD2WD1, DCT3	Bar	None	
Nokia 3610 Fold	176x220 18-bit (262,144) Color	2008	D	GSM	Nokia RAP3GS, BB5.0	Flip	1.3 MP	
**Nokia 3620**	176x208 16-bit (65,536) Color	2003	D	GSM	Nokia UPP_WD2, DCT4	Bar	VGA 0.3 MP	
**Nokia 3650**	176x208 12-bit (4096) Color	2003	D	GSM	Nokia UPP_WD2, DCT4	Bar	VGA 0.3 MP	
**Nokia 3660**	176x208 16-bit (65,536) Color	2003	D	GSM	Nokia UPP_WD2, DCT4	Bar	VGA 0.3 MP	
Nokia 3710 fold	240x320 24-bit (16M) Color	2009	D	GSM/UMTS	Unknown, BB5.0	Flip	3.2 MP	
Nokia 3711	240x320 24-bit (16M) Color	2009	D	GSM/HSPA	Unknown, BB5.0	Flip	3.2 MP	
Nokia 3720 classic	240x320 24-bit (16M) Color	2009	D	GSM, EDGE	Nokia RAPGSM, BB5.0	Bar	VGA + 2.0 MP	
Nokia 3806	240x320 18-bit (262,144) Color	2010	D	CDMA	Qualcomm QSC1110	Bar	2.0 MP	
Nokia 3810	Monochrome	1997	D	GSM	Unknown, DCT3	Bar	None	

===== Nokia 5xxx (1998–2010, 2020–present) =====
The Nokia 5000 series, previously referred to as the 'Active' line, was similar in features to the 3000 series, but often contained more features geared toward active individuals. Many of the 5000 series phones feature a rugged construction or contain extra features for music playback. The Nokia XpressMusic lineup forms a majority of the 5000 series from 2006 to 2010, before being superseded by the Nokia Xseries.

Phone model	Screen type	Released	Status	Technology	Chipset, HW platform	Form factor	Camera
Nokia 5000	240x320 (65,000) Color	2008	D	GSM, EDGE	Nokia UPP8M, DCT4+	Bar	1.3 MP
Nokia 5030 XpressRadio	128x160 16-bit (65,536) Color	2009	D	GSM	Unknown, DCT4+	Bar	None
Nokia 5070	128x160 16-bit (65,536) Color	2007	D	GSM	Nokia UPP8M, DCT4+	Bar	VGA 0.3 MP
Nokia 5100	128x128 12-bit (4096) Color	2003	D	GSM	Nokia UPP8M, DCT4	Bar	None
Nokia 5110	84x48 Monochrome	1998	D	GSM	Texas Instruments MAD2, DCT3	Bar	None
Nokia 5110i	84x48 Monochrome	1998	D	GSM	Texas Instruments MAD2, DCT3	Bar	None
Nokia 5120	84x48 Monochrome	1998	D	TDMA/AMPS	Texas Instruments MAD2, DCT3	Bar	None
Nokia 5125	84x48 Monochrome	1998	D	TDMA/AMPS	Texas Instruments MAD2, DCT3	Bar	None
Nokia 5130	84x48 Monochrome	1998	D	GSM	Texas Instruments MAD2, DCT3	Bar	None
Nokia 5130 XpressMusic	240x320 (256,000) Color	2009	D	GSM, EDGE	Nokia RAPGSM, BB5.0	Bar	2.0 MP
Nokia 5140	128x128 12-bit (4096) Color	2004	D	GSM	Nokia UPP8M, DCT4	Bar	None
Nokia 5140i	128x128 16-bit (65,536) Color	2005	D	GSM	Nokia UPP8M, DCT4	Bar	VGA 0.3 MP
Nokia 5146	84x48 Monochrome	1998	D	GSM	Texas Instruments MAD2, DCT3	Bar	None
Nokia 5160	84x48 Monochrome	1998	D	TDMA/AMPS	Texas Instruments MAD2, DCT3	Bar	None
Nokia 5160i	84x48 Monochrome	1998	D	TDMA/AMPS	Texas Instruments MAD2, DCT3	Bar	None
Nokia 5165	84x48 Monochrome	2000	D	TDMA/AMPS	Texas Instruments MAD2, DCT3	Bar	None
Nokia 5170	84x48 Monochrome	1999	D	CDMA	Texas Instruments MAD2, DCT3	Bar	None
Nokia 5170i	84x48 Monochrome	1999	D	CDMA	Texas Instruments MAD2, DCT3	Bar	None
Nokia 5180	84x48 Monochrome	2000	D	CDMA/AMPS	Texas Instruments MAD2, DCT3	Bar	None
Nokia 5180i	84x48 Monochrome	2000	D	CDMA/AMPS	Texas Instruments MAD2, DCT3	Bar	None
Nokia 5185	84x48 Monochrome	2000	D	CDMA/AMPS	Texas Instruments MAD2, DCT3	Bar	None
Nokia 5185i	84x48 Monochrome	2000	D	CDMA/AMPS	Texas Instruments MAD2, DCT3	Bar	None
Nokia 5190	84x48 Monochrome	1998	D	GSM	Texas Instruments MAD2, DCT3	Bar	None
Nokia 5200	128x160 18-bit (262,144) Color	2006	D	GSM, EDGE	Nokia RAPGSM, BB5.0	Slider	VGA 0.3 MP
Nokia 5208	128x160 18-bit (262,144) Color	2008	D	GSM	Nokia RAPGSM, BB5.0	Slider	VGA 0.3 MP
Nokia 5210	84x48 Monochrome	2002	D	GSM	Texas Instruments MAD2WD1, DCT3	Bar	None
Nokia 5220 XpressMusic	240x320 18-bit (262,144) Color	2008	D	GSM, EDGE	Unknown, BB5.0	Bar	2.0 MP
**Nokia 5228**	360x640 IU 24-bit (16M) Color	2010	D	GSM, EDGE	Nokia RAPIDO (Freescale MXC300-30), BB5.0	Bar	2.0 MP
**Nokia 5230**	360x640 IU 24-bit (16M) Color	2009	D	UMTS / GSM / EDGE / HSDPA / HSUPA / WLAN	Nokia RAPIDO (Freescale MXC300-30), BB5.0	Slate	2.0 MP
**Nokia 5230 Nuron**	360x640 IU 24-bit (16M) Color	2009	D	UMTS / GSM / EDGE / HSDPA / HSUPA / WLAN	Nokia RAPIDO (Freescale MXC300-30), BB5.0	Slate	2.0 MP
**Nokia 5232**	360x640 24-bit (16M) Color	2010	D	GSM / EDGE / WLAN	Nokia RAPIDO (Freescale MXC300-30), BB5.0	Slate	2.0 MP
**Nokia 5233**	360x640 24-bit (16M) Color	2010	D	GSM / EDGE / WLAN	Nokia RAPIDO (Freescale MXC300-30), BB5.0	Slate	2.0 MP
**Nokia 5235 Comes With Music**	360x640 24-bit (16M) Color	2010	D	GSM / EDGE / HSDPA / WLAN	Nokia RAPIDO (Freescale MXC300-30), BB5.0	Slate	2.0 MP
**Nokia 5236**	360x640 24-bit (16M) Color	2010	D	GSM / EDGE / WLAN	Nokia RAPIDO (Freescale MXC300-30), BB5.0	Slate	2.0 MP
**Nokia 5238**	360x640 24-bit (16M) Color	2010	D	GSM / EDGE / WLAN	Nokia RAPIDO (Freescale MXC300-30), BB5.0	Slate	2.0 MP
**Nokia 5250**	360x640 24-bit (16M) Color	2010	D	GSM / EDGE	Nokia RAPIDO (Freescale MXC300-30), BB5.0	Slate	2.0 MP
Nokia 5300	240x320 18-bit (262,144) Color	2006	D	GSM / EDGE	Nokia RAPGSM, BB5.0	Slider	1.3 MP
Nokia 5310 XpressMusic	240x320 24-bit (16M) Color	2007	D	GSM / EDGE	Nokia RAPGSM, BB5.0	Bar	2.0 MP
Nokia 5310 (2020)	240x320 18-bit (262,144) Color	2020	D	GSM / EDGE	Mediatek MT6260A	Bar	2.0 MP
Nokia 5310 (2024)	240x320 Color	2024	P	GSM / EDGE	Unisoc 6531F	Bar	2.0 MP
Nokia 5320 XpressMusic	240x320 (16M) Color	2008	D	GSM / GPRS / EDGE / UMTS / HSPA	Nokia RAPIDO, BB5.0	Bar	2.0 MP + CIF Video Call Camera
Nokia 5330 Mobile TV Edition	240x320 24-bit (16M) Color	2009	D	GSM / GPRS / UMTS / DVB-H	Nokia RAP3GS, BB5.0	Slider	3.2 MP
Nokia 5330 XpressMusic	240x320 24-bit (16M) Color	2009	D	GSM / UMTS	Nokia RAP3GS, BB5.0	Slider	3.2 MP
**Nokia 5500 Sport**	208x208 18-bit (262,144) Color	2006	D	GSM	Nokia RAPGSM, BB5.0	Bar	2.0 MP
**Nokia 5500 Sport Music Edition**	208x208 18-bit (262,144) Color	2006	D	GSM	Nokia RAPGSM, BB5.0	Bar	2.0 MP
Nokia 5510	84x48 Monochrome	2001	D	GSM	Texas Instruments MAD2WD1, DCT3	Bar	None
**Nokia 5530 XpressMusic**	360x640 24-bit (16M) Color	2009	D	GSM/EDGE/WLAN	Unknown, BB5.0	Slate	3.2 MP + VGA Video Call Camera
Nokia 5610 XpressMusic	240x320 24-bit (16M) Color	2007	D	GSM/EDGE/UMTS	Nokia RAP3GS, BB5.0	Slider	3.2 MP + CIF Video Call Camera
**Nokia 5630 XpressMusic**	240x320 24-bit (16M) Color	2009	D	GSM/EDGE/UMTS	Nokia RAPUYAMA (Samsung K5W4G2GACA – AL54), BB5.0	Bar	3.2 MP + VGA Video Call Camera
**Nokia 5700 XpressMusic**	240x320 24-bit (16M) Color	2007	D	GSM/EDGE/UMTS	Nokia RAPIDO, BB5.0	Swivel	2.0 MP
Nokia 5710 XpressAudio	240x320 24-bit (16M) Color	2022	P	GSM, GPRS, (E)GPRS, HSDPA, HSUPA HSPA+, LTE	Unisoc T107	Bar	0.3 MP
**Nokia 5730 XpressMusic**	240x320 24-bit (16M) Color	2009	D	GSM / GPRS / (E)GPRS / UMTS / HSDPA / HSUPA / WLAN	Nokia RAPIDOYAWE (Freescale MXC300-30), BB5.0	QWERTY slider	3.2 MP + VGA Video Call Camera
**Nokia 5800 Navigation Edition**	360x640 24-bit (16M) Color	2008	D	UMTS/GSM/EDGE/HSDPA	Nokia RAPIDO, BB5.0	Slate	3.2 MP, AF + VGA Video Call Camera
**Nokia 5800 XpressMusic**	360x640 24-bit (16M) Color	2009	D	UMTS/GSM/EDGE/HSDPA	Nokia RAPIDO, BB5.0	Slate	3.2 MP, AF + VGA Video Call Camera

===== Nokia 6xxx (1995–2010, 2020–2024) =====
The Nokia 6000 series is Nokia's largest family of phones. Originally they were the 'Classic Business' range, notable for their conservative, unisex designs, which made them popular among business users. Some of these are smartphones running Symbian. After 2007, it consists mostly of mid-rangers with broad appeal, using the 'classic' (candybar), 'slide' (slider) and 'fold' (clamshell) names with a balance between price, functionality and style.

Phone model	Screen type	Released	Status	Technology	Platform	Chipset, HW platform	Form factor	Camera
Nokia 6010	96x65 12-bit (4096) Color	2004	D	GSM	S40 1st Edition	Nokia UPP8M, DCT4	Bar	None
Nokia 6011i	96x65 12-bit (4096) Color	2004	D	CDMA		Unknown	Bar	None
Nokia 6012	96x65 12-bit (4096) Color	2004	D	CDMA/AMPS	S40 1st Edition	Unknown, DCT4	Bar	None
Nokia 6015	96x65 12-bit (4096) Color	2004	D	CDMA/AMPS	S40 1st Edition	Unknown, DCT4	Bar	None
Nokia 6015i	96x65 12-bit (4096) Color	2004	D	CDMA/AMPS	S40 1st Edition	Unknown, DCT4	Bar	None
Nokia 6016i	96x65 12-bit (4096) Color	2004	D	CDMA/AMPS	S40 1st Edition	Unknown, DCT4	Bar	None
Nokia 6019i	96x65 12-bit (4096) Color	2004	D	CDMA/AMPS	S40 1st Edition	Unknown, DCT4	Bar	None
Nokia 6020	128x128 16-bit (65,536) Color	2005	D	GSM	S40 2nd Edition	Nokia UPP8M, DCT4	Bar	0.3 MP
Nokia 6021	128x128 16-bit (65,536) Color	2005	D	GSM	S40 2nd Edition	Nokia UPP8M, DCT4	Bar	None
Nokia 6030	128x128 16-bit (65,536) Color	2005	D	GSM	S40 2nd Edition	Nokia UPP4M, DCT4	Bar	None
Nokia 6060	128x160 16-bit (65,536) Color	2005	D	GSM	S40 2nd Edition	Nokia UPP4M, DCT4	Flip	None
Nokia 6060i	128x160 16-bit (65,536) Color	2005	D	GSM	S40 2nd Edition	Nokia UPP4M, DCT4	Flip	None
Nokia 6061	128x160 16-bit (65,536) Color	2005	D	GSM	S40 2nd Edition	Nokia UPP4M, DCT4	Flip	None
Nokia 6061i	128x160 16-bit (65,536) Color	2005	D	GSM	S40 2nd Edition	Nokia UPP4M, DCT4	Flip	None
Nokia 6062	128x160 16-bit (65,536) Color	2005	D	GSM	S40 2nd Edition	Unknown, DCT4	Flip	None
Nokia 6066	128x160 16-bit (65,536) Color	2007	D	CDMA		Unknown	Flip	0.3 MP
Nokia 6070	128x160 16-bit (65,536) Color	2006	D	GSM	S40 2nd Edition	Nokia UPP8M, DCT4+	Bar	0.3 MP
Nokia 6080	128x160 16-bit (65,536) Color	2006	D	GSM	S40 2nd Edition	Nokia UPP8M, DCT4	Bar	0.3 MP
Nokia 6080 (car phone)	84x48 Monochrome	1995	D	GSM		Unknown, DCT2	Bar	None
Nokia 6081 (car phone)	84x48 Monochrome	1997	D	GSM		Unknown, DCT2	Bar	None
Nokia 6085	128x160 18-bit (262,144) Color	2006	D	GSM	S40 3rd Edition Feature Pack 2	Nokia RAPGSM, BB5.0	Flip	0.3 MP
Nokia 6086	128x160 18-bit (262,144) Color	2007	D	GSM/UMA (VoIP)	S40 3rd Edition Feature Pack 2	Nokia RAPGSM, DCT4	Flip	0.3 MP
Nokia 6088	128x160 16-bit (65,536) Color	2007	D	CDMA		Unknown	Bar	None
Nokia 6090 (car phone)	84x48 Monochrome	1999	D	GSM		Unknown, DCT3	Bar	None
Nokia 6091 (car phone)	84x48 Monochrome	1999	D	GSM		Unknown, DCT3	Bar	None
Nokia 6100	128x128 12-bit (4096) Color	2002	D	GSM	S40 1st Edition	Nokia UPP8M, DCT4	Bar	None
Nokia 6101	128x160 16-bit (65,536) Color	2004	D	GSM	S40 2nd Edition	Nokia UPP8M, DCT4	Flip	0.3 MP
Nokia 6102	128x160 16-bit (65,536) Color	2005	D	GSM	S40 2nd Edition	Nokia UPP8M, DCT4	Flip	0.3 MP
Nokia 6102i	128x160 16-bit (65,536) Color	2006	D	GSM	S40 2nd Edition	Nokia UPP8M, DCT4	Flip	0.3 MP
Nokia 6103	128x160 16-bit (65,536) Color	2006	D	GSM	S40 2nd Edition	Nokia UPP8M, DCT4	Flip	0.3 MP
Nokia 6108	128x128 12-bit (4096) Color	2003	D	GSM	S40 1st Edition	Nokia UPP8M, DCT4	Bar	None
Nokia 6110	84x48 Monochrome	1997	D	GSM	Series 20	Texas Instruments MAD2, DCT3	Bar	None
**Nokia 6110 Navigator**	240x320 24-bit (16M) Color	2007	D	HSDPA/GSM/EDGE	S60 3rd Edition Feature Pack 1	Nokia RAPIDO, BB5.0	Slider	2.0 MP w/flash
Nokia 6111	128x160 18-bit (262,144) Color	2005	D	GSM	S40 3rd Edition	Nokia TIKUEDGE, DCT4.5	Slider	1.0 MP
Nokia 6120	84x48 Monochrome	1998	D	TDMA/AMPS	Series 20	Texas Instruments MAD2, DCT3	Bar	None
**Nokia 6120 Classic**	240x320 24-bit (16M) Color	2007	D	HSDPA/GSM/EDGE	S60 3rd Edition Feature Pack 1	Nokia RAPIDOYAWE, BB5.0	Bar	2.0 MP
**Nokia 6121 Classic**	240x320 24-bit (16M) Color	2007	D	HSDPA/GSM/EDGE	S60 3rd Edition Feature Pack 1	Nokia RAPIDOYAWE, BB5.0	Bar	2.0 MP
**Nokia 6122 Classic**	240x320 24-bit (16M) Color	2008	D	GSM/EDGE	S60 3rd Edition Feature Pack 1	Nokia RAPIDOYAWE, BB5.0	Bar	2.0 MP
**Nokia 6124 Classic**	240x320 24-bit (16M) Color	2008	D	HSDPA/GSM/EDGE	S60 3rd Edition Feature Pack 1	Nokia RAPIDOYAWE, BB5.0	Bar	2.0 MP
Nokia 6125	128x160 18-bit (262,144) Color	2006	D	GSM	S40 3rd Edition Feature Pack 1	Nokia RAPGSM, BB5.0	Flip	1.3 MP
Nokia 6126	128x160 24-bit (16M) Color	2006	D	GSM	S40 3rd Edition Feature Pack 1	Nokia RAPGSM, BB5.0	Flip	1.3 MP
Nokia 6130	84x48 Monochrome	1997	D	GSM	Series 20	Texas Instruments MAD2, DCT3	Bar	None
Nokia 6131	320x240 24-bit (16M) Color	2006	D	GSM	S40 3rd Edition Feature Pack 1	Nokia RAPGSM, BB5.0	Flip	1.3 MP
Nokia 6133	320x240 24-bit (16M) Color	2006	D	GSM	S40 3rd Edition Feature Pack 1	Nokia RAPGSM, BB5.0	Flip	1.3 MP
Nokia 6135	128x160 16-bit (65,536) Color	2005	D	CDMA		Unknown, BB5.0	Flip	0.3 MP
Nokia 6136	128x160 18-bit (262,144) Color	2006	D	GSM/UMA (VoIP)	S40 3rd Edition Feature Pack 1	Nokia RAPGSM, BB5.0	Flip	1.3 MP
Nokia 6138	84x48 Monochrome	1997	D	GSM	Series 20	Texas Instruments MAD2, DCT3	Bar	None
Nokia 6150	84x48 Monochrome	1998	D	GSM	Series 20	Texas Instruments MAD2, DCT3	Bar	None
Nokia 6151	128x160 (262,144) Color	2006	D	GSM/WCDMA	S40 3rd Edition Feature Pack 1	Nokia RAP3G, BB5.0	Bar	1.3 MP
Nokia 6152	128x160 18-bit (262,144) Color; 96x65 16-bit (65,536) Color (external)	2006	D	CDMA/AMPS		Unknown, DCT4	Flip	None
Nokia 6155	128x160 18-bit (262,144) Color; 96x65 16-bit (65,536) Color (external)	2005	D	CDMA/AMPS		Unknown, DCT4	Flip	None
Nokia 6155i	128x160 18-bit (262,144) Color; 96x65 16-bit (65,536) Color (external)	2005	D	CDMA/AMPS		Unknown, DCT4	Flip	None
Nokia 6160	84x48 Monochrome	1998	D	TDMA/AMPS	Series 20	Texas Instruments MAD2, DCT3	Bar	None
Nokia 6160i	84x48 Monochrome	1998	D	TDMA/AMPS	Series 20	Texas Instruments MAD2, DCT3	Bar	None
Nokia 6161	84x48 Monochrome	1998	D	TDMA/AMPS	Series 20	Texas Instruments MAD2, DCT3	Flip	None
Nokia 6161i	84x48 Monochrome	1998	D	TDMA/AMPS	Series 20	Texas Instruments MAD2, DCT3	Flip	None
Nokia 6162	84x48 Monochrome	1998	D	TDMA/AMPS	Series 20	Texas Instruments MAD2, DCT3	Flip	None
Nokia 6162i	84x48 Monochrome	1998	D	TDMA/AMPS	Series 20	Texas Instruments MAD2, DCT3	Flip	None
Nokia 6165i	128x160 18-bit (262,144) Color; 96x65 16-bit (65,536) Color (external)	2005	D	CDMA/AMPS		Unknown	Flip	None
Nokia 6170	128x160 16-bit (65,536) Color	2004	D	GSM	S40 2nd Edition	Nokia TIKUEDGE, DCT4.5	Flip	None
Nokia 6175i	128x160 18-bit (262,144) Color	2004	D	CDMA/AMPS		Unknown	Flip	1.3 MP
Nokia 6185	Monochrome	1999	D	CDMA/AMPS	Series 20	Texas Instruments MAD2, DCT3	Bar	None
Nokia 6185i	Monochrome	1999	D	CDMA/AMPS	Series 20	Texas Instruments MAD2, DCT3	Bar	None
Nokia 6188	Monochrome	1999	D	CDMA/AMPS	Series 20	Texas Instruments MAD2, DCT3	Bar	None
Nokia 6190	84x48 Monochrome	1997	D	GSM	Series 20	Texas Instruments MAD2, DCT3	Bar	None
Nokia 6200	128x128 12-bit (4096) Color	2003	D	GSM	S40 1st Edition	Nokia UPP8M, DCT4	Bar	None
Nokia 6205	128x128 18-bit (262,144) Color	2008	D	CDMA		Unknown	Flip	1.2 MP
Nokia 6206	128x128 18-bit (262,144) Color	2008	D	CDMA		Unknown	Flip	1.2 MP
Nokia 6208 classic	24-bit (16M) Color	2009	C	GSM	S40 5th Edition Feature Pack 1	Unknown, BB5.0	Bar	3.2 MP
Nokia 6210	96x60 Monochrome	2000	D	GSM	Series 20	Texas Instruments MAD2WD1, DCT3	Bar	None
**Nokia 6210 Navigator**	240x320 24-bit (16M) Color	2008	D	GSM / GPRS / (E)GPRS / UMTS / HSDPA / HSUPA / GPS / A-GPS	S60 3rd Edition Feature Pack 2	Unknown, BB5.0	Slider	3.2 MP
Nokia 6212 classic	24-bit (16M) Color	2009	D	GSM/UMTS	S40 5th Edition Feature Pack 1	Unknown, BB5.0	Bar	2.0 MP
Nokia 6215i	128x128 18-bit (262,144) Color	2006	D	CDMA		Unknown	Flip	None
Nokia 6216 classic	24-bit (16M) Color	2009	C	GSM/UMTS	S40 5th Edition Feature Pack 1	Unknown, BB5.0	Bar	2.0 MP
Nokia 6220	128x128 12-bit (4096) Color	2003	D	GSM	S40 1st Edition	Nokia UPP8M, DCT4	Bar	0.3 MP
**Nokia 6220 classic**	240x320 24-bit (16M) Color 2.2"	2008	D	GSM / GPRS / UMTS / HSDPA / HSUPA	S60 3rd Edition Feature Pack 2	Unknown, BB5.0	Bar	5.0 MP, Carl Zeiss lens, Xenon Flash
Nokia 6225	128x128 12-bit (4096) Color	2004	D	CDMA/AMPS	S40 1st Edition	Unknown, DCT4	Bar	0.3 MP
Nokia 6230	128x128 16-bit (65,536) Color	2004	D	GSM	S40 2nd Edition	Nokia TIKUEDGE, DCT4.5	Bar	0.3 MP
Nokia 6230i	208x208 16-bit (65,536) Color	2005	D	GSM	S40 2nd Edition	Nokia TIKUEDGE, DCT4.5	Bar	1.3 MP
Nokia 6233	320x240 18-bit (262,144) Color	2006	D	UMTS/GSM	S40 3rd Edition Feature Pack 1	Nokia RAP3G, BB5.0	Bar	2.0 MP
Nokia 6234	320x240 18-bit (262,144) Color	2006	D	UMTS/GSM	S40 3rd Edition Feature Pack 1	Nokia RAP3G, BB5.0	Bar	2.0 MP
Nokia 6235	128x128 16-bit (65,536) Color	2005	D	CDMA	S40 2nd Edition	Nokia TIKUEDGE, DCT4.5	Bar	0.3 MP
Nokia 6235i	128x128 16-bit (65,536) Color	2005	D	CDMA/AMPS	S40 2nd Edition	Nokia TIKUEDGE, DCT4.5	Bar	0.3 MP
Nokia 6236i	128x128 16-bit (65,536) Color	2005	D	CDMA/AMPS	S40 2nd Edition	Nokia TIKUEDGE, DCT4.5	Bar	0.3 MP
Nokia 6250	96x65 Monochrome	2000	D	GSM	Series 20	Texas Instruments MAD2WD1, DCT3	Bar	None
Nokia 6255	128x160 16-bit (65,536) Color	2004	D	CDMA/AMPS	S40 2nd Edition	Nokia TIKUEDGE, DCT4.5	Flip	0.3 MP
Nokia 6255i	128x160 16-bit (65,536) Color	2004	D	CDMA/AMPS	S40 2nd Edition	Nokia TIKUEDGE, DCT4.5	Flip	0.3 MP
Nokia 6256i	128x160 16-bit (65,536) Color	2004	D	CDMA/AMPS	S40 2nd Edition	Nokia TIKUEDGE, DCT4.5	Flip	0.3 MP
Nokia 6260	176x208 16-bit (65,536) Color	2004	D	GSM	S60 2nd Edition Feature Pack 1	Nokia UPP_WD2, DCT4	Flip	0.3 MP
Nokia 6260 Slide	320x480 24-bit (16M) Color	2008	D	GSM/WCDMA/HSDPA/HSUPA/VoIP	S40 6th Edition	Unknown, BB5.0	Slider	5.0 MP
Nokia 6263	240x320 24-bit (16M) Color	2008	D	GSM/WCDMA EGPRS HSCSD	S40 5th Edition	Nokia RAP3GS, BB5.0	Flip	1.0 MP
Nokia 6265	320x240 18-bit (262,144) Color	2005	D	CDMA	S40 3rd Edition	Unknown	Slider	2.0 MP
Nokia 6267	320x240 24-bit (16M) Color	2007	D	UMTS/GSM	S40 5th Edition	Nokia RAP3GS, BB5.0	Flip	2.0 MP
Nokia 6268	320x240 18-bit (262,144) Color	2005	D	CDMA		Unknown	Slider	2.0 MP
Nokia 6270	320x240 18-bit (262,144) Color	2005	D	GSM	S40 3rd Edition	Nokia RAPGSM, BB5.0	Slider	2.0 MP
Nokia 6275	320x240 18-bit (262,144) Color	2006	D	CDMA	S40 3rd Edition	Unknown	Bar	2.0 MP
Nokia 6275i	320x240 18-bit (262,144) Color	2006	D	CDMA	S40 3rd Edition	Unknown	Bar	2.0 MP
Nokia 6280	320x240 18-bit (262,144) Color	2005	D	UMTS/GSM	S40 3rd Edition	Nokia RAP3G, BB5.0	Slider	2.0 MP
Nokia 6282	320x240 18-bit (262,144) Color	2005	D	UMTS/GSM	S40 3rd Edition	Nokia RAP3G, BB5.0	Slider	2.0 MP
Nokia 6288	320x240 18-bit (262,144) Color	2006	D	UMTS/GSM	S40 3rd Edition	Nokia RAP3G, BB5.0	Slider	2.0 MP
**Nokia 6290**	240x320 24-bit (16M) Color; 128x160 16-bit (262,144) Color (external)	2006	D	UMTS/GSM	S60 3rd Edition Feature Pack 1	Nokia RAPIDO, BB5.0	Flip	2.0 MP
Nokia 6300	320x240 24-bit (16M) Color	2006	D	GSM	S40 3rd Edition Feature Pack 2	Nokia RAPGSM, BB5.0	Bar	2.0 MP
Nokia 6300i	320x240 24-bit (16M) Color	2008	D	GSM and VoIP	S40 5th Edition Feature Pack 1	Nokia RAPGSM, BB5.0	Bar	2.0 MP
Nokia 6300 4G	240x320 24-bit (16M) Color	2020	D	LTE/HSPA/GSM	KaiOS	Qualcomm QC8909 Snapdragon 210	Bar	VGA
Nokia 6301	320x240 24-bit (16M) Color	2008	D	GSM/UMA/WLAN (through mobile data)	S40 5th Edition Feature Pack 1	Nokia RAPGSM, BB5.0	Bar	2.0 MP
Nokia 6303 classic	320x240 32-bit (16M) colour	2009	D	GSM	S40 6th Edition	Nokia RAPGSM, BB5.0	Bar	3.2 MP
Nokia 6303i classic	320x240 32-bit (16M) colour	2010	D	GSM	S40 6th Edition	Nokia RAPGSM, BB5.0	Bar	3.2 MP
Nokia 6305i	320x240 18-bit (262,144) Color	2006	D	CDMA		Unknown	Slider	2.0 MP
Nokia 6310	96x65 Monochrome	2001	D	GSM	Series 30	Nokia UPP8M, DCT4	Bar	None
Nokia 6310i	96x65 Monochrome	2002	D	GSM	Series 30	Nokia UPP8M, DCT4	Bar	None
Nokia 6310 (2021)	320x240 18-bit (262,144) Color	2021	P	GSM	Series 30+	Unisoc 6531F	Bar	VGA
Nokia 6310 (2024)	320x240 24-bit (16M) Color	2024	P	GSM	Series 30+	Unisoc 6531F	Bar	VGA
Nokia 6315i	128x160 18-bit (262,144) Color	2006	D	CDMA		Qualcomm MSM6500	Flip	None
Nokia 6316 Slide	320x240 18-bit (262,144) Color	2010	D	CDMA		Qualcomm QSC6085	Slider	2.0 MP
Nokia 6340	96x65 Monochrome	2003	D	GSM/TDMA	Series 30	Nokia UPP8M, DCT4	Bar	None
Nokia 6340i	96x65 Monochrome	2002	D	GSM/TDMA	Series 30	Nokia UPP8M, DCT4	Bar	None
Nokia 6350	240x320 16-bit (65,536) Color	2009	D	HSDPA	S40 6th Edition	Unknown	Flip	2.0 MP
Nokia 6360	96x65 Monochrome	2001	D	TDMA	Series 30	Nokia UPP8M, DCT4	Bar	None
Nokia 6370	96x65 Monochrome	2002	D	CDMA	Series 30	Nokia UPP8M, DCT4	Bar	None
Nokia 6385	96x65 Monochrome	2002	D	CDMA/AMPS	Series 30	Nokia UPP8M, DCT4	Bar	None
Nokia 6500	96x65 Monochrome	2002	D	GSM	Series 30	Nokia UPP8M, DCT4	Slider	None
Nokia 6500 classic	240x320 24-bit (16M) Color	2007	D	GSM/UMTS	S40 5th Edition Feature Pack 1	Nokia RAP3GS, BB5.0	Bar	2.0 MP
Nokia 6500 slide	240x320 24-bit (16M) Color	2007	D	GSM/UMTS	S40 5th Edition Feature Pack 1	Nokia RAP3GS, BB5.0	Slider	3.2 MP
Nokia 6510	96x65 Monochrome	2002	D	GSM	Series 30	Nokia UPP8M, DCT4	Bar	None
Nokia 6555	240x320 24-bit (16M) Color	2007	D	GSM/UMTS	S40 5th Edition	Unknown, BB5.0	Flip	1.3 MP
Nokia 6560	128x128 12-bit (4096) Color	2003	D	TDMA/AMPS	S40 1st Edition	Nokia UPP8M, DCT4	Bar	None
Nokia 6585	128x128 12-bit (4096) Color	2003	D	CDMA/AMPS	S40 1st Edition	Nokia UPP8M, DCT4	Bar	None
Nokia 6590	96x65 Monochrome	2002	D	GSM	Series 30	Nokia UPP8M, DCT4	Bar	None
Nokia 6590i	96x65 Monochrome	2003	D	GSM	Series 30	Nokia UPP8M, DCT4	Bar	None
**Nokia 6600**	176x208 16-bit (65,536) Color	2003	D	GSM	S60 2nd Edition	Nokia UPP_WD2, DCT4	Bar	0.3 MP
Nokia 6600 fold	240x320 24-bit (16M) Color	2008	D	UMTS/GSM	S40 5th Edition Feature Pack 1	Unknown, BB5.0	Flip	2.0 MP
Nokia 6600 slide	240x320 24-bit (16M) Color	2008	D	UMTS/GSM	S40 5th Edition Feature Pack 1	Nokia RAP3G, BB5.0	Slider	3.2 MP
Nokia 6600i slide	240x320 24-bit (16M) Color	2009	D	UMTS/GSM	S40 5th Edition Feature Pack 1	Nokia RAP3G, BB5.0	Slider	5.0 MP
Nokia 6610	128x128 12-bit (4,096) Color	2002	D	GSM	S40 1st Edition	Nokia UPP8M, DCT4	Bar	None
Nokia 6610i	128x128 12-bit (4,096) Color	2004	D	GSM	S40 1st Edition	Nokia UPP8M, DCT4	Bar	0.1 MP
**Nokia 6620**	176x208 16-bit (65,536) Color	2005	D	GSM	S60 2nd Edition Feature Pack 1	Nokia UPP8M, DCT4	Bar	2.0 MP
**Nokia 6630**	176x208 16-bit (65,536) Color	2004	D	UMTS/GSM	S60 2nd Edition Feature Pack 2	Nokia RAP3G, BB5.0	Bar	1.3 MP
**Nokia 6638**	176x208 16-bit (65,536) Color	2004	C	CDMA/GSM	S60 2nd Edition Feature Pack 2	Nokia RAP3G, BB5.0	Bar	1.2 MP
Nokia 6650	128x160 12-bit (4096) Color	2003	D	UMTS/GSM	S40 1st Edition	Nokia TIKU, DCT4.5	Bar	None
**Nokia 6650 fold**	240x320 18-bit (262,144) Color	2008	D	HSDPA/GSM	S60 3rd Edition Feature Pack 2	Freescale MXC300-30, BB5.0	Flip	2.0 MP
Nokia 6651	128x160 12-bit (4096) Color	2004	D	UMTS/GSM	S40 1st Edition	Nokia TIKU, DCT4.5	Bar	None
**Nokia 6670**	176x208 16-bit (65,536) Color	2004	D	GSM	S60 2nd Edition Feature Pack 1	Nokia UPP_WD2, DCT4	Bar	1.0 MP
**Nokia 6680**	176x208 18-bit (262,144) Color	2005	D	UMTS/GSM	S60 2nd Edition Feature Pack 2	Nokia RAP3G, BB5.0	Bar	1.3 MP + VGA
**Nokia 6681**	176x208 18-bit (262,144) Color	2005	D	GSM	S60 2nd Edition Feature Pack 2	Nokia RAP3G, BB5.0	Bar	1.3 MP
**Nokia 6682**	176x208 18-bit (262,144) Color	2005	D	GSM	S60 2nd Edition Feature Pack 2	Nokia RAP3G, BB5.0	Bar	1.3 MP
Nokia 6700 classic	240x320 24-bit (16M) Color	2009	D	HSDPA/GSM	S40 6th Edition	Nokia RAPUYAMA, BB5.0	Bar	5.0 MP
Nokia 6700 slide	240x320 24-bit (16M) Color	2010	D	HSDPA/GSM	S60 3rd Edition Feature Pack 2	Nokia RAPUYAMA, BB5.0	Slider	5.0 MP
**Nokia 6708**	208x320 16-bit (65K) Color	2005	D	GPRS/GSM	UIQ 2.1	Unknown, BB5.0	Bar	1.3 MP
**Nokia 6710 Navigator**	240x320 24-bit (16M) Color	2009	D	HSDPA/GSM/EDGE	S60 3rd Edition Feature Pack 2	Nokia RAPUYAMA, BB5.0	Slider	5.0 MP
**Nokia 6720 classic**	240x320 24-bit (16M) Color	2009	D	HSDPA/GSM	S60 3rd Edition Feature Pack 2	Nokia RAPUYAMA, BB5.0	Bar	5.0 MP
**Nokia 6730 classic**	240x320 24-bit (16M) Color	2009	D	GSM/EDGE/UMTS	S60 3rd Edition Feature Pack 2	Nokia RAPUYAMA, BB5.0	Bar	3.2 MP
Nokia 6750 Mural	240x320 24-bit (16M) Color	2009	D	GSM/EDGE/UMTS/HSCSD/HSDPA	S40 6th Edition	Unknown, BB5.0	Flip	2.0 MP
**Nokia 6760 Slide**	320x240 24-bit (16M) Color	2009	D	HSDPA/GSM	S60 3rd Edition Feature Pack 2	Nokia RAPIDO, BB5.0	Slider	3.2 MP
**Nokia 6788**	240x320 24-bit (16M) Color	2009	D	GSM	S60 3rd Edition Feature Pack 2	Unknown, BB5.0	Slider	5.0 MP
**Nokia 6788i**	240x320 24-bit (16M) Color	2009	D	GSM	S60 3rd Edition Feature Pack 2	Unknown, BB5.0	Slider	5.0 MP
**Nokia 6790 Surge**	320x240 24-bit (16M) Color	2009	D	HSDPA/GSM	S60 3rd Edition Feature Pack 2	Nokia RAPIDO, BB5.0	Slider	3.2 MP
Nokia 6800	128x128 12-bit (4096) Color	2003	D	GSM	S40 1st Edition	Nokia UPP8M, DCT4	Bar/flip	None
Nokia 6810	128x128 12-bit (4096) Color	2004	D	GSM	S40 1st Edition	Nokia UPP8M, DCT4	Bar/flip	None
Nokia 6820	128x128 12-bit (4096) Color	2004	D	GSM	S40 1st Edition	Nokia UPP8M, DCT4	Bar/flip	None
Nokia 6822	128x128 16-bit (65,536) Color	2005	D	GSM	S40 2nd Edition	Nokia UPP8M, DCT4	Bar/flip	None

Nokia 6136 UMA is the first mobile phone to include Unlicensed Mobile Access. Nokia 6131 NFC is the first mobile phone to include Near Field Communication.

===== Nokia 7xxx – Fashion and Experimental series (1999–2010) =====
The Nokia 7000 series is a family of Nokia phones with two uses. Most phones in the 7000 series are targeted towards fashion-conscious users, often with feminine styling to appeal to women. Some phones in this family also test features. The 7000 series are considered to be a more consumer-oriented family of phones when contrasted to the business-oriented 6000 series. The family is also distinguished from the 3000-series phones as being more mature and female-oriented, while the 3000-series was largely targeted towards the youth market.

Phone model	Screen type	Released	Status	Technology	Platform	Chipset, HW platform	Form factor	Camera
Nokia 7020	240x320 18-bit (262,144) Color	2009	D	GSM	S40 6th Edition	Unknown, BB5.0	Flip	2.0 MP
Nokia 7070 Prism	128x160 16-bit (65,536) Color	2008	D	GSM	S40 5th Edition	Nokia UPP8M, DCT4+	Flip	None
Nokia 7088	128x160 16-bit (65,536) Color	2007	D	CDMA		Unknown	Slider	None
Nokia 7100 Supernova	240x320 16-bit (65,536) Color	2008	D	GSM	S40 5th Edition Feature Pack 1	Nokia UPP8M, DCT4+	Slider	1.3 MP
Nokia 7110	96x65 Monochrome	1999	D	GSM	Series 20	Nokia MAD2PR1, DCT3	Slider	None
Nokia 7160	96x65 Monochrome	2000	D	TDMA/AMPS	Series 20	Nokia MAD2PR1, DCT3	Slider	None
Nokia 7190	96x65 Monochrome	2000	D	GSM	Series 20	Nokia MAD2PR1, DCT3	Slider	None
Nokia 7200	128x128 16-bit (65,536) Color	2004	D	GSM	S40 1st Edition	Nokia UPP8M, DCT4	Flip	0.3 MP
Nokia 7205 Intrigue	240x320 18-bit (262,144) Color	2009	D	CDMA		Unknown	Flip	2.0 MP
Nokia 7208	240x320 18-bit (262,144) Color	2009	D	CDMA		Unknown	Flip	2.0 MP
Nokia 7210	128x128 12-bit (4096) Color	2002	D	GSM	S40 1st Edition	Nokia UPP8M, DCT4	Bar	None
Nokia 7210 Supernova	240x320 18-bit (262,144) Color	2008	D	GSM	S40 5th Edition Feature Pack 1	Nokia RAPGSM, BB5.0	Bar	2.0 MP
Nokia 7230	240x320 18-bit (262,144) Color	2010	D	GSM, UMTS	S40 6th Edition	Nokia RAP3GS, BB5.0	Slider	3.2 MP
Nokia 7250	128x128 12-bit (4096) Color	2003	D	GSM	S40 1st Edition	Nokia UPP8M, DCT4	Bar	0.1 MP
Nokia 7250i	128x128 12-bit (4096) Color	2003	D	GSM	S40 1st Edition	Nokia UPP8M, DCT4	Bar	0.1 MP
Nokia 7260	128x128 16-bit (65,536) Color	2004	D	GSM	S40 2nd Edition	Nokia UPP8M, DCT4	Bar	0.3 MP
Nokia 7270	128x160 16-bit (65,536) Color	2004	D	GSM	S40 2nd Edition	Nokia TIKUEDGE, DCT4	Flip	0.3 MP
Nokia 7280	104x208 16-bit (65,536) Color	2004	D	GSM	S40 2nd Edition	Nokia TIKUEDGE, DCT4	Slider	0.3 MP
Nokia 7310 Supernova	240x320 24-bit (16M) Color	2008	D	GSM	S40 5th Edition Feature Pack 1	Nokia RAP3GS, BB5.0	Bar	2.0 MP
Nokia 7360	128x160 16-bit (65,536) Color	2005	D	GSM	S40 2nd Edition	Nokia UPP8M, DCT4	Bar	0.3 MP
Nokia 7370	240x320 18-bit (262,144) Color	2006	D	GSM	S40 3rd Edition	Nokia RAPGSM, BB5.0	Swivel	1.3 MP
Nokia 7373	240x320 18-bit (262,144) Color	2006	D	GSM	S40 3rd Edition Feature Pack 2	Nokia RAPGSM, BB5.0	Swivel	2.0 MP
Nokia 7376	240x320 24-bit (16M) Color	2006	C	GSM/UMTS		Nokia RAPGSM(?), BB5.0	Flip	3.2 MP
Nokia 7380	104x208 16-bit (65,536) Color	2006	D	GSM	S40 2nd Edition	Unknown, DCT4	Bar	2.0 MP
Nokia 7390	240x320 24-bit (16M) Color	2006	D	GSM/UMTS	S40 3rd Edition Feature Pack 2	Nokia RAP3G, BB5.0	Flip	3.0 MP
Nokia 7500 Prism	240x320 24-bit (16M) Color	2007	D	GSM	S40 5th Edition	Nokia RAPGSM, BB5.0	Bar	2.0 MP
Nokia 7510 Supernova	240x320 24-bit (16M) Color	2009	D	GSM/UMA	S40 6th Edition	Nokia RAP3GS, BB5.0	Flip	2.0 MP
Nokia 7600	128x160 16-bit (65,536) Color	2003	D	GSM/UMTS	S40 1st Edition	Nokia TIKU, DCT4.5	Bar	0.3 MP
**Nokia 7610**	176x208 16-bit (65,536) Color	2004	D	GSM	S60 2nd Edition Feature Pack 1	Nokia UPP_WD2, DCT4	Bar	1.0 MP
Nokia 7610 Supernova	240x320 24-bit (16M) Color	2008	D	GSM	S40 5th Edition Feature Pack 1	Nokia RAP3GS, BB5.0	Slider	3.2 MP
**Nokia 7650**	176x208 12-bit (4096) Color	2002	D	GSM	S60 1st Edition	Nokia UPP_WD2, DCT4	Slider	0.3 MP
**Nokia 7700**	640x320 16-bit (65,536) Color	2004	C	GSM	Series 90	Texas Instruments OMAP 1510		0.3 MP
Nokia 7705 Twist	320x240 18-bit (262,144) Color	2009	D	CDMA		Qualcomm QSC6075	Swivel	3.0 MP
**Nokia 7710**	640x320 16-bit (65,536) Color	2005	D	GSM	Series 90	Nokia UPP8M, DCT4	Slate	1.0 MP
Nokia 7900 Prism	240x320 24-bit (16M) Color	2007	D	GSM, GPRS, EDGE, UMTS	S40 5th Edition Feature Pack 1	Nokia RAP3GS, BB5.0	Bar	2.0 MP
Nokia 7900 Crystal Prism	240x320 24-bit (16M) Color	2008	D	GSM, GPRS, EDGE, UMTS	S40 5th Edition Feature Pack 1	Nokia RAP3GS, BB5.0	Bar	2.0 MP

The 7110 was the first Nokia phone with a WAP browser. WAP was significantly hyped up during the 1998–2000 Internet boom. However WAP did not meet these expectations and uptake was limited. Another industry first was the flap, which slid from beneath the phone with a push from the release button. Unfortunately the cover was not too durable. The 7110 was also the only phone to feature a navi-roller key.

The 7250i was a slightly improved version of the Nokia 7250. It includes XHTML and OMA Forward lock digital rights management. The phone has exactly the same design as the 7250. This phone is far more popular than the 7250 and has been made available on pre-paid packages and therefore it is very popular amongst youths in the UK and other European countries.

The 7510 Supernova was a phone exclusive to T-Mobile USA. Only some units of this model have Wi-Fi chips with UMA. The Wi-Fi adapter on this phone supports up to WPA2 encryption if present. This phone uses Xpress-On Covers.

The 7650 was the first Series 60 smartphone of Nokia. It was quite basic compared to smartphones, it didn't have MMC slot, but it had a camera.

The 7610 was Nokia's first smartphone featuring a megapixel camera (1,152x864 pixels), and is targeted towards the fashion conscious individual. End-users can also use the 7610 with Nokia Lifeblog. Other pre-installed applications include the Opera and Kodak Photo Sharing. It is notable for its looks, having opposite corners rounded off. It comes with a 64 MB Reduced Size MMC. The main CPU is an ARM compatible chip (ARM4T architecture) running at 123 MHz.

The 7710's 640x320 screen was a touch screen phone.

===== Nokia 8xxx (1996–2007, 2018–present) =====
The Nokia 8000 series was originally referred to as the company's 'Premium' range of handsets including luxury phones. This series is characterized by ergonomics and attractiveness. The internals of the phone are similar to those in different series and so on that level offer nothing particularly different, however the physical handset itself offers a level of functionality which appeals to users who focus on ergonomics. The front slide keypad covers offered a pseudo-flip that at the time Nokia were unwilling to make. Materials used increased the cost and hence exclusivity of these handsets.

The only exception to the rule (there are many in different series) is the 82xx and 83xx which were very small and light handsets.

Phone model	Screen type	Released	Status	Technology	Platform	Chipset, HW platform	Form factor	Camera	Notes
Nokia 8000 4G	320x240 24-bit (16M) Color	2021	D	LTE/HSPA/GSM	KaiOS	Qualcomm MSM8909 Snapdragon 210	Bar	2 MP	
Nokia 8110	84x48 Monochrome	1996	D	GSM		Unknown, DCT2	Slider	None	
Nokia 8110i	84x48 Monochrome	1997	D	GSM		Unknown, DCT2	Slider	None	
Nokia 8110 4G	240x320 18-bit (262,144) Color	2018	D	LTE/HSPA/GSM	KaiOS	Qualcomm MSM8905 Snapdragon 205	Slider	2 MP	
Nokia 8146	84x48 Monochrome	1998	D	GSM		Unknown, DCT2	Slider	None	
Nokia 8148	84x48 Monochrome	1998	D	GSM		Unknown, DCT2	Slider	None	
Nokia 8148i	84x48 Monochrome	1998	D	GSM		Unknown, DCT2	Slider	None	
Nokia 8208	320x240 24-bit (16M) Color	2009	D	CDMA		Qualcomm QSC6085	Slider	3.2 MP	
Nokia 8210	84x48 Monochrome	1999	D	GSM	Series 20	Texas Instruments MAD2WD1, DCT3	Bar	None	
Nokia 8210 4G	240x320 18-bit (262,144) Color	2022	D	LTE, HSDPA/ HSUPA, GSM	Series 30+	Unisoc T107	Bar	0.3 MP	
Nokia 8250	84x48 Monochrome	2001	D	GSM	Series 20	Texas Instruments MAD2WD1, DCT3	Bar	None	
Nokia 8260	84x48 Monochrome	2000	D	TDMA/AMPS	Series 20	Texas Instruments MAD2WD1, DCT3	Bar	None	
Nokia 8265	84x48 Monochrome	2002	D	TDMA/AMPS	Series 20	Texas Instruments MAD2WD1, DCT3	Bar	None	
Nokia 8265i	84x48 Monochrome	2002	D	TDMA/AMPS	Series 20	Texas Instruments MAD2WD1, DCT3	Bar	None	
Nokia 8270	84x48 Monochrome	2002	D	CDMA	Series 20	Texas Instruments MAD2WD1, DCT3	Bar	None	
Nokia 8277	84x48 Monochrome	2002	D	CDMA	Series 20	Texas Instruments MAD2WD1, DCT3	Bar	None	
Nokia 8280	96x65 Monochrome	2002	D	CDMA2000 1x	Series 20	Texas Instruments MAD2WD1, DCT3	Bar	None	
Nokia 8280i	96x65 Monochrome	2002	D	CDMA2000 1x	Series 20	Texas Instruments MAD2WD1, DCT3	Bar	None	
Nokia 8290	84x48 Monochrome	2001	D	GSM	Series 20	Texas Instruments MAD2WD1, DCT3	Bar	None	
Nokia 8310	84x48 Monochrome	2001	D	GSM	Series 30	Nokia UPP8M, DCT4	Bar	None	
Nokia 8390	84x48 Monochrome	2002	D	GSM	Series 30	Nokia UPP8M, DCT4	Bar	None	
Nokia 8587	120x160 12-bit (4096) Color	2002	D	CDMA		Qualcomm MSM5100	Flip	None	Exclusive only to Korean Market
Nokia 8600 Luna	320x240 24-bit (16M) Color	2007	D	GSM	S40 3rd Edition Feature Pack 1	Nokia RAPGSM, BB5.0	Slider	2.0 MP	
Nokia 8800	208x208 18-bit (262,144) Color	2005	D	GSM	S40 2nd Edition	Nokia TIKUEDGE, DCT4.5	Slider	SVGA	
Nokia 8800 Arte	320x240 24-bit (16M) Color	2007	D	GSM/UMTS	S40 5th Edition Feature Pack 1	Nokia RAP3G, BB5.0	Slider	3.15 MP	
Nokia 8800 Carbon Arte	320x240 24-bit (16M) Color	2008	D	GSM/UMTS	S40 5th Edition Feature Pack 1	Nokia RAP3G, BB5.0	Slider	3.15 MP	
Nokia 8800 Gold Arte	320x240 24-bit (16M) Color	2008	D	GSM/UMTS	S40 5th Edition Feature Pack 1	Nokia RAP3G, BB5.0	Slider	3.15 MP	
Nokia 8800 Sapphire Arte	320x240 24-bit (16M) Color	2008	D	GSM/UMTS	S40 5th Edition Feature Pack 1	Nokia RAP3G, BB5.0	Slider	3.15 MP	
Nokia 8800 Sirocco Edition	208x208 18-bit (262,144) Color	2006	D	GSM	S40 3rd Edition Feature Pack 1	Nokia TIKUEDGE, DCT4	Slider	2.0 MP	
Nokia 8801	208x208 18-bit (262,144) Color	2005	D	GSM	S40 2nd Edition	Nokia TIKUEDGE, DCT4	Slider	SVGA	
Nokia 8810	84x48 Monochrome	1998	D	GSM	Series 20	Texas Instruments MAD2, DCT3	Slider	None	
Nokia 8850	84x48 Monochrome	1999	D	GSM	Series 20	Texas Instruments MAD2WD1, DCT3	Slider	None	
Nokia 8855	84x48 Monochrome	2001	D	GSM	Series 20	Texas Instruments MAD2WD1, DCT3	Slider	None	
Nokia 8860	84x48 Monochrome	1999	D	TDMA/AMPS	Series 20	Texas Instruments MAD2, DCT3	Slider	None	
Nokia 8877	Monochrome	2001	D	GPRS, EDGE, CDMA		Qualcomm MSM5105	Flip	None	Exclusive only to Korean Market
Nokia 8887	Monochrome	2001	D	GPRS, EDGE, CDMA		Qualcomm MSM5105	Flip	None	Exclusive only to Korean Market
Nokia 8890	84x48 Monochrome	2000	D	GSM	Series 20	Texas Instruments MAD2WD1, DCT3	Slider	None	
Nokia 8910	84x48 Monochrome	2002	D	GSM	Series 30	Nokia UPP8M, DCT4	Slider	None	
Nokia 8910i	96x65 12-bit (4096) Color	2003	D	GSM	S40 1st Edition	Nokia UPP8M, DCT4	Slider	None	

===== Nokia 9xxx – Communicator series (1996–2007) =====
The Nokia 9000 series was reserved for the Communicator series, but the last Communicator, the E90 Communicator, was an Eseries phone.

Phone model	Screen type	Released	Status	Technology	Platform	Chipset, HW platform	Form factor	Camera	Images
Nokia 9000 Communicator	640x200 Monochrome	1996	D	GSM	/GEOS	Unknown, DCT1	Flip	None	
Nokia 9000i Communicator	640x200 Monochrome	1997	D	GSM	/GEOS	Unknown, DCT1	Flip	None	
Nokia 9000iL Communicator	640x200 Monochrome	1997	D	GSM	/GEOS	Unknown, DCT1	Flip	None	
Nokia 9110 Communicator	640x200 Monochrome	1998	D	GSM	Series 20/GEOS	Texas Instruments MAD2, DCT3	Flip	None	
Nokia 9110i Communicator	640x200 Monochrome	2000	D	GSM	Series 20/GEOS	Texas Instruments MAD2, DCT3	Flip	None	
Nokia 9210 Communicator	640x200 12-bit (4096) Color	2001	D	GSM	Series 20/S80 1st Edition	Nokia MADLinda, DCT3	Flip	None	
Nokia 9210i Communicator	640x200 12-bit (4096) Color	2002	D	GSM	Series 20/S80 1st Edition	Nokia MADLinda, DCT3	Flip	None	
Nokia 9290 Communicator	640x200 12-bit (4096) Color	2002	D	GSM	Series 20/S80 1st Edition	Nokia MADLinda, DCT3	Flip	None	
Nokia 9300	640x200 16-bit (65,536) Color	2004	D	GSM	S80 2nd Edition	Unknown, DCT4	Flip	None	
Nokia 9300i	640x200 16-bit (65,536) Color	2006	D	GSM	S80 2nd Edition	Unknown, DCT4	Flip	None	
Nokia 9500 Communicator	640x200 16-bit (65,536) Color	2004	D	GSM	S80 2nd Edition	Nokia UPP8M, DCT4	Flip	VGA	

==== Lettered series: C/E/N/X (2005–2011) ====
===== Cseries (2010–2011) =====
The Nokia Cseries is a budget and mid-range lineup optimized for social media, networking and multimedia. The range includes a mix of feature phones running Series 40 and some smartphones running Symbian. The Series 40 models serve as successors to the previous lower-end numbered series (1xxx to 5xxx), while the Symbian models shares many similarities to the Nseries for its focus on multimedia, combined with the networking capabilities of the Eseries.

Phone model	Screen type	Released	Status	Technology	Platform	Chipset, HW platform	Form factor	Camera	Internal Memory	Images
Nokia C1-00	128x160 pixels (65K)	2010	D	GSM	Series 30	Infineon X-GOLD 110 PMB7900, DCT4+	Bar	None		
Nokia C1-01	128x160 pixels (65K)	2011 Q2	D	GSM GPRS EDGE	S40 6th Edition Lite	Infineon PMB8810, BB5.0	Bar	VGA (0.3 MP)	16 MB	
Nokia C1-02	128x160 pixels (65K)	2011 Q4	D	GSM GPRS	S40 6th Edition Lite	Infineon PMB8810, BB5.0	Bar	None		
Nokia C1-03	128x160 pixels (65K)	2011 Q2	D	GSM GPRS	S40 6th Edition Lite	Infineon PMB8810, BB5.0	Bar	VGA (0.3 MP)	32 MB	
Nokia C2-00	128x160 pixels (65K)	2011 Q2	D	GSM GPRS EDGE	S40 6th Edition Lite	Infineon PMB8810, BB5.0	Bar	VGA (0.3 MP)		
Nokia C2-01	240x320 pixels (256K)	2010	D	GSM EDGE UMTS	S40 6th Edition	Nokia RAP3GS2, BB5.0	Bar	3.2 MP		
Nokia C2-02	240x320 pixels (262K)	2011 Q3	D	GSM GPRS EDGE	S40 6th Edition Feature Pack 1	Unknown, BB5.0	Slider	2.0 MP		
Nokia C2-03	240x320 pixels (262K)	2011 Q3	D	GSM GPRS EDGE	S40 6th Edition Feature Pack 1	Unknown, BB5.0	Slider	2.0 MP		
Nokia C2-05	240x320 pixels (65K)	2011 Q4	D	GSM GPRS EDGE	S40 6th Edition Feature Pack 1	Infineon X-Gold213 XMM2130, BB5.0	Slider	VGA (0.3 MP)		
Nokia C2-06	240x320 pixels (262K)	2011 Q3	D	GSM GPRS EDGE	S40 6th Edition Feature Pack 1	Unknown, BB5.0	Slider	2.0 MP		
Nokia C3-00	320x240 pixels (256K) Color TFT	2010 Q2	D	GSM EDGE WLAN	S40 6th Edition	Broadcom BCM21351, BB5.0	Keyboard bar	2.0 MP		
Nokia C3-01	240x320 (256K) TFT Color	2010 Q4	D	GSM EDGE, UMTS, WLAN	S40 6th Edition Feature Pack 1	Nokia RAPUYAMA, BB5.0	Bar	5.0 MP		
Nokia C3-01.5	240x320 (256K) TFT Color	2011 Q3	D	GSM EDGE, UMTS, WLAN	S40 6th Edition Feature Pack 1	Nokia RAPUYAMA v2, BB5.0	Bar	5.0 MP		
Nokia C3-01 Gold Edition (Touch and Type)	240x320 (256K) TFT Color	2011 Q3	D	GSM EDGE, UMTS, WLAN	S40 6th Edition Feature Pack 1	Nokia RAPUYAMA v2, BB5.0	Bar	5.0 MP		
**Nokia C5-00**	240x320 pixels (16M) Color TFT	2010 Q2	D	GSM/UMTS	S60 3rd Edition Feature Pack 2	Nokia RAPUYAMA, BB5.0	Bar	5.0 MP		
**Nokia C5-03**	640x360 pixels (16M) transmissive	2010 Q4	D	GSM EGPRS UMTS WLAN WCDMA/HSDPA EGSM	S60 5th Edition	Nokia RAPUYAMA, BB5.0	Slate	5.0 MP		
**Nokia C6-00**	640x360 pixels (16M)	2010 Q2	D	GSM EGPRS UMTS WLAN WCDMA/HSDPA EGSM	S60 5th Edition	Nokia RAPIDOYAWE, BB5.0	QWERTY slider	5.0 MP		
**Nokia C6-01**	640x360 pixels (16M)	2010 Q4	D	GSM EGPRS UMTS WLAN WCDMA/HSDPA EGSM	Symbian^3	Nokia RAPUYAMA, BB5.0	Slate	8.0 MP (720p HD)		
**Nokia C7-00**	640x360 pixels (16M)	2010 Q4	D	GSM EGPRS UMTS WLAN WCDMA/HSDPA EGSM	Symbian^3	Nokia RAPUYAMA, BB5.0	Slate	8.0 MP (720p HD)		

C1-00 and C2-00 are dual SIM phones, but with Nokia C1-00 both SIM cards cannot be utilized at the same time.

===== Eseries (2006–2011) =====
The Nokia Eseries is an enterprise-class smartphones running Symbian, with business-optimized products focusing on email and Internet.

Phone model	Screen type	Released	Status	Technology	Platform	Chipset, HW platform	Form factor	Camera	Images
Nokia E50	240x320 18-bit (262,144) Color	2006	D	GSM/EDGE	S60 3rd Edition	Nokia RAPGSM, BB5.0	Bar	1.3 megapixels	
Nokia E51	240x320 24-bit (16M) Color	2007	D	GSM/EDGE/HSDPA/3G/WLAN	S60 3rd Edition Feature Pack 1	Nokia RAPIDOYAWE, BB5.0	Bar	2 megapixels	
Nokia E52	320x240 24-bit (16M) Color	2009	D	GSM/EDGE/HSDPA/3G/WLAN	S60 3rd Edition Feature Pack 2	Nokia RAPUYAMA, BB5.0	Bar	3.2 megapixels	
Nokia E55	320x240 24-bit (16M) Color	2009	D	GSM/EDGE/HSDPA/3G/WLAN	S60 3rd Edition Feature Pack 2	Nokia RAPUYAMA, BB5.0	Bar	3.2 megapixels	
Nokia E60	352x416 24-bit (16M) Color	2006	D	GSM/UMTS/WLAN	S60 3rd Edition	Nokia RAP3G, BB5.0	Bar	None	
Nokia E61	320x240 24-bit (16M) Color	2006	D	GSM/UMTS/WLAN	S60 3rd Edition	Nokia RAP3GS, BB5.0	Keyboard bar	VGA	
Nokia E61i	320x240 24-bit (16M) Color	2007	D	GSM/EDGE/UMTS/WLAN	S60 3rd Edition	Nokia RAP3GS, BB5.0	Keyboard bar	2 megapixels	
Nokia E62	320x240 24-bit (16M) Color	2006	D	GSM/EDGE	S60 3rd Edition	Nokia RAP3GS, BB5.0	Keyboard bar	VGA	
Nokia E63	320x240 24-bit (16M) Color	2008	D	3G/GSM/EDGE/UMTS/WLAN	S60 3rd Edition Feature Pack 1	Nokia RAPIDO, BB5.0	Keyboard bar	2 megapixels	
Nokia E65	240x320 24-bit (16M) Color	2007	D	GSM/EDGE/UMTS/WLAN	S60 3rd Edition	Nokia RAP3GS, BB5.0	Slider	2 megapixels	
Nokia E65 Internet Limited Edition	240x320 24-bit (16M) Color	2007	D	GSM/EDGE/UMTS/WLAN	S60 3rd Edition	Nokia RAP3GS, BB5.0	Slider	2 megapixels	
Nokia E66	240x320 24-bit (16M) Color	2008	D	GSM/EDGE/UMTS/WLAN	S60 3rd Edition Feature Pack 1	Nokia RAPIDO, BB5.0	Slider	3.15 megapixels	
Nokia E70	352x416 24-bit (16M) Color	2006	D	GSM/WLAN/UMTS (Europe/Asia)	S60 3rd Edition	Unknown, BB5.0	Bar/flip	2 megapixels	
Nokia E71	320x240 24-bit (16M) Color	2008	D	GSM/EDGE/UMTS/WLAN	S60 3rd Edition Feature Pack 1	Nokia RAPIDO, BB5.0	Keyboard bar	3.2 megapixels	
Nokia E72	320x240 24-bit (16M) Color	2009	D	GSM/EDGE/HSDPA/HSUPA/WLAN	S60 3rd Edition Feature Pack 2	Nokia RAPUYAMA, BB5.0	Keyboard bar	5.0 megapixels	
Nokia E73 Mode	320x240 24-bit (16M) Color	2010	D	GSM/UMTS, EDGE, HSDPA, HSUPA, 3.5G, WLAN	S60 3rd Edition Feature Pack 2	Nokia RAPUYAMA, BB5.0	Keyboard bar	5.0 megapixels	
Nokia E75	320x240 24-bit (16M) Color	2009	D	GSM/EDGE/UMTS/3G/WLAN	S60 3rd Edition Feature Pack 2	Nokia RAPIDOYAWE, BB5.0	QWERTY slider	3.2 megapixels	
Nokia E5-00	320x240 24-bit (16M) Color	2010	D	GSM/EDGE/HSDPA/3G	S60 3rd Edition Feature Pack 2	Nokia RAPUYAMA, BB5.0	Keyboard bar	5.0 megapixels	
Nokia E6-00	640x480 24-bit (16M) Color	2011	D	GSM/EDGE/UMTS/HSPA	Symbian Anna	Nokia RAPUYAMA, BB5.0	Keyboard bar	8.0 megapixels	
Nokia E7-00	640x360 24-bit (16M) Color	2011	D	GSM/EDGE/HSDPA/3G	Symbian^3	Nokia RAPUYAMA, BB5.0	QWERTY slider	8.0 megapixels	
Nokia E90 Communicator	800x352 24-bit (16M) Color	2007	D	GSM/EDGE/3G/WLAN	S60 3rd Edition Feature Pack 1	Nokia RAPIDO, BB5.0	Flip	3.15 megapixels	

===== Nseries (2005–2011) =====
The Nseries are multimedia-focused Symbian smartphones featuring advanced cameras and other multimedia capabilities including music, video, and gaming. All of Nokia's flagship Symbian smartphones are part of the Nseries.

Phone model	Screen type	Released	Status	Technology	Platform	Chipset, HW platform	Form factor	Camera	Images
Nokia N70	176x208 18-bit (262,144) Color	2005	D	GSM/EDGE/UMTS	S60 2nd Edition Feature Pack 3	Nokia RAP3G, BB5.0	Bar	2.0 megapixels	
Nokia N70 Music Edition	176x208 18-bit (262,144) Color	2006	D	GSM/UMTS	S60 2nd Edition Feature Pack 3	Nokia RAP3G, BB5.0	Bar	2.0 megapixels	
Nokia N71	320x240 18-bit (262,144) Color	2006	D	GSM/UMTS	S60 3rd Edition	Nokia RAP3G, BB5.0	Flip	2.0 megapixels	
Nokia N72	176x208 18-bit (262,144) Color	2006	D	GSM	S60 2nd Edition Feature Pack 3	Nokia RAP3G, BB5.0	Bar	2.0 megapixels	
Nokia N73	320x240 18-bit (262,144) Color	2006	D	GSM/EDGE/UMTS	S60 3rd Edition	Nokia RAP3GS, BB5.0	Bar	3.2 megapixels	
Nokia N73 Music Edition	320x240 18-bit (262,144) Color	2007	D	GSM/EDGE/UMTS	S60 3rd Edition	Nokia RAP3GS, BB5.0	Bar	3.2 megapixels	
Nokia N75	320x240 24-bit (16M) Color	2006	D	GSM/UMTS	S60 3rd Edition	Texas Instruments OMAP 1710, BB5.0	Flip	2.0 megapixels	
Nokia N76	320x240 24-bit (16M) Color	2007	D	GSM/UMTS	S60 3rd Edition Feature Pack 1	Nokia RAPIDO, BB5.0	Flip	2.0 megapixels	
Nokia N77	329x240 24-bit (16M) Color	2007	D	GSM/UMTS DVB-H	S60 3rd Edition	Nokia RAP3G, BB5.0	Bar	2.0 megapixels	
Nokia N78	320x240 24-bit (16M) Color	2008	D	GSM EGPRS UMTS Wi-Fi WCDMA HSDPA EGSM	S60 3rd Edition Feature Pack 2	Nokia RAPIDO, BB5.0	Bar	3.2 megapixels	
Nokia N79	320x240 24-bit (16M) Color	2008	D	GSM EGPRS UMTS Wi-Fi WCDMA HSDPA EGSM	S60 3rd Edition Feature Pack 2	Nokia RAPIDO, BB5.0	Bar	5.0 megapixels	
Nokia N8	360x640 (16M) Capacitive AMOLED touchscreen	2010	D	GSM EGPRS UMTS WLAN WCDMA HSDPA EGSM	Symbian^3	Nokia RAPUYAMA, BB5.0	Slate	12.0 megapixels (720p HD)	
Nokia N80	352x416 18-bit (262,144) Color	2006	D	GSM/UMTS	S60 3rd Edition	Nokia RAP3G, BB5.0	Slider	3.2 megapixels	
Nokia N81	240x320 24-bit (16M) Color	2007	D	GSM/UMTS/WLAN	S60 3rd Edition Feature Pack 1	Nokia RAPIDO, BB5.0	Slider	2.0 megapixels	
Nokia N81 8GB	240x320 24-bit (16M) Color	2007	D	GSM/UMTS/Wi-Fi	S60 3rd Edition Feature Pack 1	Nokia RAPIDO, BB5.0	Slider	2.0 megapixels	
Nokia N82	240x320 24-bit (16M) Color	2007	D	GSM EGPRS UMTS Wi-Fi WCDMA HSDPA EGSM	S60 3rd Edition Feature Pack 1	Nokia RAPIDO, BB5.0	Bar	5.0 megapixels	
Nokia N85	240x320 24-bit (16M) Color	2008	D	GSM EGPRS UMTS Wi-Fi WCDMA HSDPA EGSM	S60 3rd Edition Feature Pack 2	Nokia RAPIDOYAWE, BB5.0	2-way slider	5.0 megapixels	
Nokia N86 8MP	240x320 24-bit (16M) Color	2009	D	GSM EGPRS UMTS Wi-Fi WCDMA HSDPA EGSM	S60 3rd Edition Feature Pack 2	Nokia RAPIDOYAWE, BB5.0	2-way slider	8.0 megapixels	
Nokia N9	854x480 (16M) Capacitive AMOLED touchscreen	2011	D	GSM EGPRS UMTS Wi-Fi WCDMA HSDPA EGSM	MeeGo 1.2 Harmattan	Texas Instruments TMS320C64x	Slate	8.0 megapixels	
Nokia N90	352x416 18-bit (262,144) Color	2005	D	GSM/UMTS	S60 2nd Edition Feature Pack 3	Nokia RAP3G, BB5.0	Flip/swivel	2.0 megapixels	
Nokia N900	800x480 24-bit (16M) Resistive touchscreen	2009	D	GSM EGPRS UMTS WLAN WCDMA HSDPA EGSM	Maemo 5	Texas Instruments OMAP 3430	QWERTY slider	5.0 megapixels	
Nokia N91	176x208 18-bit (262,144) Color	2005	D	GSM/UMTS	S60 3rd Edition	Nokia RAP3G, BB5.0	Slider	2.0 megapixels	
Nokia N92	240x320 24-bit (16M) Color	2007	D	GSM/UMTS	S60 3rd Edition	Unknown, BB5.0	Flip/swivel	2.0 megapixels	
Nokia N93	240x320 18-bit (262,144) Color	2006	D	GSM/UMTS	S60 3rd Edition	Nokia RAP3GS, BB5.0	Flip/swivel	3.2 megapixels	
Nokia N93i	240x320 24-bit (16M) Color	2007	D	GSM EGPRS UMTS WLAN WCDMA HSDPA EGSM	S60 3rd Edition	Nokia RAP3GS, BB5.0	Flip/swivel	3.2 megapixels	
Nokia N95	240x320 24-bit (16M) Color 2.6in	2006	D	GSM EGPRS UMTS WLAN WCDMA HSDPA EGSM	S60 3rd Edition Feature Pack 1	Nokia RAPIDO, BB5.0	2-way slider	5.0 megapixels	
Nokia N95 8GB	240x320 24-bit (16M) Color 2.8in	2007	D	GSM EGPRS UMTS Wi-Fi WCDMA HSDPA EGSM	S60 3rd Edition Feature Pack 1	Nokia RAPIDO, BB5.0	2-way slider	5.0 megapixels	
Nokia N950	854x480 24-bit (16M) Capacitive touchscreen	2011	Not released to market	GSM EGPRS UMTS WLAN WCDMA HSDPA EGSM	MeeGo 1.2 Harmattan	Unknown	QWERTY slider	8.0 megapixels	
Nokia N96	240x320 24-bit (16M) Color	2008	D	GSM EGPRS UMTS WLAN WCDMA HSDPA EGSM DVB-H	S60 3rd Edition Feature Pack 2	Nokia RAPIDO, BB5.0	2-way slider	5.0 megapixels	
Nokia N97	640x360 24-bit (16M) Color	2009	D	GSM EGPRS UMTS WLAN WCDMA HSDPA EGSM	S60 5th Edition	Nokia RAPIDOYAWE, BB5.0	QWERTY slider	5.0 megapixels	
Nokia N97 mini	360x640 24-bit (16M) Color	2009	D	GSM EGPRS UMTS WLAN WCDMA HSDPA EGSM	S60 5th Edition	Nokia RAPIDOYAWE, BB5.0	QWERTY slider	5.0 megapixels	

Note:

- Although part of the Nseries, the Nokia **N800** and **N810** Internet Tablets did not include phone functionality. See the Internet Tablets section.
- The Nokia N950 was meant to be the Nokia N9 with the old Nokia N9 'Lankku' being N9-01, however the N9-00 model number was used for the all touch 'Lankku' with the original design being the MeeGo developer-only N950.

===== Xseries (2009–2011) =====
The Nokia Xseries targets a young audience with a focus on music and entertainment, succeeding the XpressMusic family and incorporating the multimedia features of the Nseries. Like the Cseries, it is a mix of both Series 30/40 feature phones and Series 60 Symbian smartphones.

Phone model	Screen type	Released	Status	Technology	Platform	Chipset, HW platform	Form factor	Camera	Images
Nokia X1-00	128x160 TFT Color	2011	D	GSM EDGE	Series 30	Unknown	Bar	N/A	
Nokia X1-01	128x160 TFT Color	2011	D	GSM EDGE	Series 30	Unknown	Bar	N/A	
Nokia X2-00	240x320 (256K) TFT Color	2010	D	GSM EDGE	S40 6th Edition	Broadcom BCM21351, BB5.0	Bar	5 MP	
Nokia X2-01	320x240 (256K) TFT Color	2010	D	GSM EDGE	S40 6th Edition	Broadcom BCM21351, BB5.0	Keyboard bar	0.3 MP	
Nokia X2-02	320x240 (65K) TFT Color	2011	D	GSM EDGE	S40 6th Edition	Infineon X-GOLD 213 PMB8810, BB5.0	Bar	2 MP	
Nokia X3-00	240x320 (256K) TFT Color	2009	D	GSM EDGE	S40 6th Edition	Unknown, BB5.0	Slider	3.2 MP	
Nokia X3-02 (Touch and Type)	240x320 (256K) TFT Color	2010	D	GSM EDGE, UMTS, WLAN	S40 6th Edition Feature Pack 1	Nokia RAPUYAMA, BB5.0	Bar	5 MP	
Nokia X3-02.5 (Touch and Type)	240x320 (256K) TFT Color	2011	D	GSM EDGE, UMTS, WLAN	S40 6th Edition Feature Pack 1	Nokia RAPUYAMA v2, BB5.0	Bar	5 MP	
Nokia X5-00	320x240 (16M) TFT Color	2010	D	TD-SCDMA, GSM, UMTS, WLAN	S60 3rd Edition Feature Pack 2	Unknown, BB5.0	Bar	5 MP	
Nokia X5-01	320x240 (16M) TFT Color	2010	D	GSM, UMTS, WLAN	S60 3rd Edition Feature Pack 2	Nokia RAPUYAMA, BB5.0	Slider	5 MP	
**Nokia X6-00**	640x360 (nHD) (16M) Color (Capacitive touchscreen)	2009 (Comes With Music/32GB); 2010 (16GB, 8 GB)	D	GSM EDGE UMTS WLAN	S60 5th Edition	Nokia RAPIDOYAWE, BB5.0	Bar	5 MP	
**Nokia X7-00**	640x360 AMOLED (16M) Color (Capacitive touchscreen)	2011	D	GSM EDGE UMTS WLAN	Symbian Anna	Nokia RAPUYAMA, BB5.0	Bar	8 MP	

==== 3-digit series Symbian phones (2011–2012) ====
Since the Nokia 500, Nokia has changed the nomenclature for Symbian^3 phones.

Phone model	Screen type	Released	Status	Technology	Chipset, HW platform	Operating system	Form factor	Camera	Images
Nokia 500	360x640	2011	D	GSM, EDGE, WCDMA, HSDPA, HSUPA, WLAN	Nokia RAPUYAMA v2 (Samsung K5W2G1GACT – AP50), BB5.0	Symbian Anna	Slate	5.0 MP	
Nokia 600	360x640	2011	C	GSM, EDGE, WCDMA, HSDPA, HSUPA, WLAN	Nokia RAPUYAMA v2, BB5.0	Nokia Belle	Slate	5.0 MP	
Nokia 603	360x640	2011	D	GSM, EDGE, WCDMA, HSDPA, HSUPA, WLAN	Nokia RAPUYAMA v2, BB5.0	Nokia Belle	Slate	5.0 MP	
Nokia 700	360x640	2011	D	GSM, EDGE, WCDMA, HSDPA, HSUPA, WLAN	Nokia RAPUYAMA v2, BB5.0	Nokia Belle	Slate	5.0 MP	
Nokia 701	360x640	2011	D	GSM, EDGE, WCDMA, HSDPA, HSUPA, WLAN	Nokia RAPUYAMA v2, BB5.0	Nokia Belle	Slate	8.0 MP	
Nokia 808 PureView	360x640	2012	D	GSM, EDGE, WCDMA, HSDPA, HSUPA, WLAN	Nokia RAPUYAMA v2, BB5.0	Nokia Belle Feature Pack 1	Slate	41 MP	

==== Worded series: Asha/Lumia/X (2011–2014) ====
===== Asha (2011–2014) =====
The Nokia Asha series is an affordable feature phone range optimized for social networking and sharing, meant for first time users and emerging markets. This range run Series 40 except Asha 230, 310, 311 and 50x models, which run on the Nokia Asha platform.

Phone model	Screen type	Released	Status	Technology	Platform	Form factor	Camera	Images
Nokia Asha 200/201	320x240 pixels (256K)	2011 Q4	D	GSM GPRS EGPRS	S40 6th Edition Feature Pack 1	Keyboard bar	2.0 MP	
Nokia Asha 202	240x320 pixels (256K)	2012 Q2	D	GSM GPRS EGPRS	S40 6th Edition Feature Pack 1	Bar	2.0 MP	
Nokia Asha 203	240x320 pixels (256K)	2012 Q2	D	GSM GPRS EGPRS	S40 6th Edition Feature Pack 1	Bar	2.0 MP	
Nokia Asha 205	320x240 pixels (56K)	2012 Q4	D	GSM WCDMA GPRS EGPRS	S40 6th Edition Feature Pack 1	Keyboard bar	0.3 MP	
Nokia Asha 210	320x240 pixels	2013 Q2	D	GSM GPRS EDGE WLAN	S40 6th Edition Feature Pack 1	Keyboard bar	2 MP	
Nokia Asha 300	240x320 pixels (256K)	2011 Q4	D	GSM WCDMA GPRS EGPRS HSDPA	S40 6th Edition Feature Pack 1	Bar	5 MP	
Nokia Asha 302	240x320 pixels (256K)	2012 Q1	D	GSM WCDMA GPRS EGPRS HSDPA HSUPA WLAN	S40 6th Edition Feature Pack 1	Keyboard bar	3.2 MP	
Nokia Asha 303	240x320 pixels (256K)	2011 Q4	D	GSM WCDMA GPRS EGPRS HSDPA HSUPA WLAN	S40 6th Edition Feature Pack 1	Keyboard bar	3.2 MP	
Nokia Asha 305	240x400 pixels (65K)	2012 Q3	D	GSM GPRS EGPRS	S40 Developer Platform 2.0	Slate	2 MP	
Nokia Asha 306	240x400 pixels (65K)	2012 Q3	D	GSM GPRS EGPRS WLAN	S40 Developer Platform 2.0	Slate	2 MP	
Nokia Asha 308	240x400 pixels (56K)	2012 Q4	D	GSM GPRS EGPRS	S40 Developer Platform 2.0	Slate	2 MP	
Nokia Asha 309	240x400 pixels (56K)	2012 Q4	D	GSM GPRS EGPRS WLAN	S40 Developer Platform 2.0	Slate	2 MP	
Nokia Asha 310	240x400 pixels (65K)	2013 Q1	D	GSM GPRS EGPRS WLAN	S40 Developer Platform 2.0	Slate	2 MP	
Nokia Asha 311	240x400 pixels (65K)	2012 Q3	D	GSM GPRS EGPRS WCDMA HSDPA HSUPA WLAN	S40 Developer Platform 2.0	Slate	3.2 MP	
Nokia Asha 230	320x240 pixels (262K)	2014 Q2	D	GSM GPRS EGPRS	Nokia Asha platform 1.1	Slate	1.3 MP	
Nokia Asha 500	320x240 pixels (262K)	2012 Q4	D	GSM GPRS EGPRS WLAN	Nokia Asha platform 1.1.1	Slate	2 MP	
Nokia Asha 501	320x240 pixels	2013 Q2	D	GSM GPRS EGPRS WLAN	Nokia Asha platform 1.0	Slate	3.2 MP	
Nokia Asha 502	320x240 pixels (262K)	2013 Q4	D	GSM GPRS EGPRS WLAN	Nokia Asha platform 1.1	Slate	5 MP w/ flash	
Nokia Asha 503	320x240 pixels (262K)	2013 Q4	D	GSM GPRS EGPRS WCDMA HSDPA HSUPA WLAN	Nokia Asha platform 1.2	Slate	5 MP w/ flash	

===== Lumia (2011–2014) =====
Lumia is a series of smartphones running Windows Phone. It also includes the Nokia Lumia 2520, a Windows RT-powered tablet computer. The series was sold to Microsoft in 2014 who branded these products under the name Microsoft.

Devices with Microsoft branding are not listed here.

Phone model	Screen type	Released	Technology	Status	Operating system	Chipset	Camera	Codename
Nokia Lumia 505	3.7" AMOLED	2013	GSM, EDGE, HSDPA, WLAN	D	Windows Phone 7.8	Qualcomm MSM7227A Snapdragon S1	8MP	Glory
Nokia Lumia 510	4" TFT	2012	GSM, EDGE, HSDPA, WLAN	D	Windows Phone 7.5 (Mango)	Qualcomm MSM7227A Snapdragon S1	5MP	Glory
Nokia Lumia 520	4" IPS	2013	GSM, EDGE, HSDPA, WLAN	D	Windows Phone 8	Qualcomm MSM8227	5MP	Fame
Nokia Lumia 525	4" IPS	2013	GSM, EDGE, HSDPA, WLAN	D	Windows Phone 8	Qualcomm MSM8227	5MP	Glee
Nokia Lumia 530	4" IPS	2014	GSM, EDGE, HSDPA, WLAN	D	Windows Phone 8.1	Qualcomm Snapdragon 200	5MP	Rock
Nokia Lumia 610	3.7" TFT	2012	GSM, EDGE, UMTS, WLAN	D	Windows Phone 7.5 (Mango)	Qualcomm MSM7227A Snapdragon S1	5MP	Cliff
Nokia Lumia 620	3.8" IPS	2013	GSM, EDGE, HSDPA, WLAN	D	Windows Phone 8	Qualcomm Snapdragon S4	5MP	Sand
Nokia Lumia 625	4.7" IPS	2013	GSM, LTE	D	Windows Phone 8	Qualcomm MSM8930 Snapdragon 400	5MP	Max
Nokia Lumia 630	4.5" IPS	Build 2014	GSM, EDGE, HSPDA, WLAN, LTE	D	Windows Phone 8.1	Qualcomm Snapdragon 400	5MP	Moneypenny
Nokia Lumia 635	4.5" IPS	Build 2014	LTE	D	Windows Phone 8.1	Qualcomm Snapdragon 400	5MP	Moneypenny
Nokia Lumia 636	4.5" IPS	Build 2014	LTE-FDD, LTE-TDD	D	Windows Phone 8.1	Qualcomm Snapdragon 400	5MP	Moneypenny
Nokia Lumia 638	4.5" IPS	Build 2014	LTE-FDD, LTE-TDD	D	Windows Phone 8.1	Qualcomm Snapdragon 400	5MP	Moneypenny
Nokia Lumia 710	3.7" AMOLED	Nokia World 2011	GSM, EDGE, UMTS, WLAN	D	Windows Phone 7.5 (Mango)	Qualcomm MSM8255 Snapdragon S2	5MP	Sabre
Nokia Lumia 720	4.3" IPS	2013	GSM, EDGE, HSDPA, WLAN	D	Windows Phone 8	Qualcomm MSM8227	6.7MP	Zeal
Nokia Lumia 730	4.7" AMOLED	IFA 2014	GSM, EDGE, HSPDA	D	Windows Phone 8.1	Qualcomm Snapdragon 400	6.7MP	Superman
Nokia Lumia 735	4.7" AMOLED	IFA 2014	GSM, EDGE, HSPDA, LTE	D	Windows Phone 8.1	Qualcomm Snapdragon 400	6.7MP	Superman
Nokia Lumia 800	3.7" AMOLED	Nokia World 2011	GSM, EDGE, UMTS, WLAN	D	Windows Phone 7.5 (Mango)	Qualcomm MSM8255 Snapdragon S2	8.7MP	Searay
Nokia Lumia 810	4.3" AMOLED	2012	GSM, EDGE, HSDPA, WLAN	D	Windows Phone 8	Qualcomm MSM8960 Snapdragon S4 Plus	8.7MP	Torpedo
Nokia Lumia 820	4.3" AMOLED	Nokia World 2012	GSM, EDGE, UMTS, WLAN, 4G LTE – LTE 800, 900, 1800, 2100 & 2600	D	Windows Phone 8	Qualcomm MSM8960 Snapdragon S4 Plus	8.7MP	Arrow
Nokia Lumia 822	4.3" AMOLED	2012	GSM, EDGE, HSDPA, WLAN	D	Windows Phone 8	Qualcomm MSM8960 Snapdragon S4 Plus	8.7MP	Atlas
Nokia Lumia 830	5" IPS	2014	GSM, EDGE, HSPDA, LTE	D	Windows Phone 8.1	Qualcomm Snapdragon 400	10MP	Tesla
Nokia Lumia 900	4.3" AMOLED	CES 2012	GSM, EDGE, UMTS, WLAN, 4G LTE – LTE 700 & 1700	D	Windows Phone 7.5 (Mango)	Qualcomm APQ8055 Snapdragon S2	8.7MP	Ace
Nokia Lumia 920	4.5" IPS	Nokia World 2012	GSM, EDGE, UMTS, WLAN, 4G – LTE 800, 900, 1800, 2100 & 2600; TD-SCDMA (China only)	D	Windows Phone 8	Qualcomm MSM8960 Snapdragon S4 Plus	8.7MP	Phi
Nokia Lumia 925	4.5" AMOLED	2013	GSM, EDGE, HSPDA, LTE, WLAN	D	Windows Phone 8	Qualcomm MSM8960 Snapdragon S4 Plus	8.7MP	Catwalk
Nokia Lumia 928	4.5" AMOLED	2013		D	Windows Phone 8	Qualcomm MSM8960 Snapdragon S4 Plus	8.7MP	Laser
Nokia Lumia 930	5" AMOLED	Build 2014	GSM, EDGE, HSPDA, LTE, WLAN	D	Windows Phone 8.1	Qualcomm MSM8974 Snapdragon 800	20MP	Martini
Nokia Lumia 1020	4.5" AMOLED	2013		D	Windows Phone 8	Qualcomm MSM8960 Snapdragon S4 Plus	41MP	EOS
Nokia Lumia 1320	6" IPS	Nokia world 2013		D	Windows Phone 8	Qualcomm MSM8230AB Snapdragon 400 (GSM), Qualcomm MSM8930AB Snapdragon 400 (LTE)	5MP	Batman
Nokia Lumia 1520	6" IPS	Nokia world 2013		D	Windows Phone 8	Qualcomm MSM8974 Snapdragon 800	20MP	Bandit
Nokia Lumia 2520	10.1" IPS	Nokia world 2013		D	Windows RT	Qualcomm MSM8974 Snapdragon 800	6.7MP	Sirius
Nokia Lumia ICON	5" AMOLED	2014	GSM, EDGE, HSPDA, LTE, WLAN	D	Windows Phone 8.1	Qualcomm Snapdragon 800	20MP	Vanquish

===== X Family (2014) =====
The Nokia X family is a range of Android smartphones from Nokia. These were the first ever Nokia phones to run Google's Android OS.

Phone Model	Screen Type	Released	Status	Technology	Platform	Form Factor	Rear Camera	Notes	Images
**Nokia X**	4" WVGA Capacitive Touch Screen	2014 Feb	D		Nokia X software platform 1.x (Android 4.1.2)	Bar	3.2 MP		
**Nokia X+**	4" WVGA Capacitive Touch Screen	2014 Feb	D		Nokia X software platform 1.x (Android 4.1.2)	Bar	3.2 MP		
**Nokia XL**	5" WVGA Capacitive Touch Screen	2014 Feb	D		Nokia X software platform 1.x (Android 4.1.2)	Bar	5 MP		
**Nokia X2**	4.3" WVGA Capacitive Touch Screen	2014 June	D	Clear Black Display	Nokia X software platform 2.x (Android 4.3)	Bar	5 MP		
**Nokia XL 4G**	5" WVGA Capacitive Touch Screen	2014 July	D		Nokia X software platform 1.x (Android 4.3)	Bar	5 MP	China mobile version	

==== 3-digit series feature phones (2011–present) ====
This series serve as the continuation of Nokia's earlier Series 30/40 feature phone lineup, with a focus on long battery life. The series was sold in 2014 to Microsoft which continued branding these products under Nokia. Microsoft sold this series to HMD Global in 2016 which also continues branding these products under Nokia.

Phone model	Screen type	Released	Status	Technology	Chipset, HW platform	Operating system	Form factor	Camera	Notes	Images
Nokia 100 (2011)	128x160	2011	D	GSM	Infineon X-GOLD 110 PMB7900, DCT4+	Series 30	Bar	None		
Nokia 101 (2011)	128x160	2011	D	GSM	Infineon X-GOLD 110 PMB7900, DCT4+	Series 30	Bar	None		
Nokia 103	96x68 Monochrome	2012	D	GSM	Infineon X-GOLD 110 PMB7900, DCT4+	Series 30	Bar	None		
Nokia 105 (2013)	128x128	2013	D	GSM	Infineon X-GOLD 110 PMB7900, DCT4+	Series 30	Bar	None		
Nokia 105 (2015)	128x128	2015	D	GSM	MediaTek MT6261D	Series 30+	Bar	None		
Nokia 105 (2017)	128x160	2017	D	GSM	MediaTek MT6261D	Series 30+	Bar	None		
Nokia 105 (2019)	128x160	2019	D	GSM	Spreadtrum SPD6531	Series 30+	Bar	None		
Nokia 105 4G (2021)	240x320	2021	P	GSM, HSPA, LTE	Unknown	Series 30+	Bar	None		
Nokia 105 (2022)	240x320	2022	P	GSM	Mediatek MT6261D	Series 30+	Bar	None		
Nokia 105+ (2022)	240x320	2022	P	GSM	Mediatek MT6261D	Series 30+	Bar	None		
Nokia 105 (2023)	240x320	2023	P	GSM	Unknown	Series 30+	Bar	None		
Nokia 105 4G (2023)	240x320	2023	P	GSM, HSPA, LTE	Unknown	Series 30+	Bar	None		
Nokia 105 (2024)	120x160	2023	P	GSM	Unknown	Series 30+	Bar	None		
Nokia 105 4G (2024)	240x320	2024	P	GSM, HSPA, LTE	Unisoc T127	Series 30+	Bar	None		
Nokia 106	128x160	2013	D	GSM	Unknown, DCT4+	Series 30	Bar	None		
Nokia 106 (2018)	128x160	2018	D	GSM	Mediatek MT6261D	Series 30+	Bar	None		
Nokia 106 (2023)	128x160	2023	P	GSM	Unknown	Series 30+	Bar	None		
Nokia 107 (2013)	128x160	2013	D	GSM	Unknown, DCT4+	Series 30	Bar	None		Nokia 107 dual sim card
Nokia 108	128x160	2013	D	GSM	MediaTek MT6250	Series 30+	Bar	VGA (0.3 MP)		
Nokia 108 4G	240x320	2024	P	GSM, HSPA, LTE	Unisoc T127	Series 30+	Bar	None		
Nokia 109	128x160	2012	D	GSM, EDGE	Infineon PMB8810, BB5.0	S40 6th Edition Lite	Bar	None	Chinese version is C1-02i	
Nokia 110	128x160	2012	D	GSM, EDGE	Infineon PMB8810, BB5.0	S40 6th Edition Lite	Bar	VGA (0.3 MP)		
Nokia 110 (2019)	120x160	2019	D	GSM	Spreadtrum SC6531E	Series 30+	Bar	0.1 MP		
Nokia 110 4G (2021)	120x160	2021	P	GSM, HSPA, LTE	Unknown	Series 30+	Bar	0.1 MP		
Nokia 110 (2022)	120x160	2022	P	GSM	Unknown	Series 30+	Bar	0.1 MP		
Nokia 110 (2023)	120x160	2023	P	GSM	Unknown	Series 30+	Bar	0.1 MP		
Nokia 110 4G (2023)	120x160	2023	P	GSM, HSPA, LTE	Unisoc T107	Series 30+	Bar	0.1 MP		
Nokia 110 4G (2024)	120x160	2024	P	GSM, HSPA, LTE	Unisoc T127	Series 30+	Bar	0.1 MP		
Nokia 111	128x160	2012	D	GSM, EDGE	Infineon PMB8810, BB5.0	S40 6th Edition Lite	Bar	VGA (0.3 MP)		
Nokia 112	128x160	2012	D	GSM, EDGE	Infineon PMB8810, BB5.0	S40 6th Edition Lite	Bar	VGA (0.3 MP)		
Nokia 113	128x160	2012	D	GSM, EDGE	Infineon PMB8810, BB5.0	S40 6th Edition Lite	Bar	VGA (0.3 MP)		
Nokia 114	128x160	2012	D	GSM, EDGE	Infineon PMB8810, BB5.0	S40 6th Edition Lite	Bar	VGA (0.3 MP)		
Nokia 125	240x320	2020	D	GSM	MediaTek MT6261	Series 30+	Bar	None		
Nokia 125 4G	240x320	2024	P	GSM, HSPA, LTE	Unknown	Series 30+	Bar	None		
Nokia 130 (2014)	128x160	2014	D	GSM	Unknown	Series 30+	Bar	None		
Nokia 130 (2017)	128x160	2017	D	GSM	Unknown	Series 30+	Bar	VGA (0.3 MP)		
Nokia 130 (2023)	240x320	2023	P	GSM	Unknown	Series 30+	Bar	None		
Nokia 130 Music	240x320	2025	P	GSM	Unisoc 6531F	Series 30+	Bar	None		
Nokia 150 (2016)	128x160	2016	D	GSM	MediaTek MT6261	Series 30+	Bar	None		
Nokia 150 (2020)	240x320	2020	D	GSM	Unknown	Series 30+	Bar	VGA (0.3 MP)		
Nokia 150 (2023)	240x320	2023	P	GSM	Unknown	Series 30+	Bar	VGA (0.3 MP)		
Nokia 150 Music	240x320	2025	P	GSM	Unisoc 6531F	Series 30+	Bar	VGA (0.3 MP)		
Nokia 206	240x320	2013	D	GSM, EDGE	Unknown	S40 6th Edition	Bar	1.3 MP		
Nokia 207	240x320	2013	D	GSM, EDGE, WCDMA, HSDPA, HSUPA	Unknown	S40 6th Edition Feature Pack 1	Bar	None		
Nokia 208	240x320	2013	D	GSM, EDGE, WCDMA, HSDPA, HSUPA	Unknown	S40 6th Edition Feature Pack 1	Bar	1.3 MP		
Nokia 210	240x320	2019	D	GSM	Mediatek MT6260A	Series 30+	Bar	VGA (0.3 MP)		
Nokia 215	240x320	2015	D	GSM, EDGE	MediaTek MT6260A	Series 30+	Bar	VGA (0.3 MP)		
Nokia 215 4G (2020)	240x320	2020	D	GSM, HSPA, LTE	Unisoc UMS9117	Series 30+	Bar	None		
Nokia 215 4G (2024)	240x320	2024	P	GSM, HSPA, LTE	Unisoc T107	Series 30+	Bar	None		
Nokia 216	240x320	2016	D	GSM, EDGE	MediaTek MT6260	Series 30+	Bar	VGA (0.3 MP)		
Nokia 220	240x320	2014	D	GSM, GPRS	MediaTek MT6250A	Series 30+	Bar	2.0 MP		
Nokia 220 4G (2019)	240x320	2019	D	GSM, HSPA, LTE	Unknown	Series 30+	Bar	2.0 MP		
Nokia 220 4G (2024)	240x320	2024	P	GSM, HSPA, LTE	Unisoc T107	Series 30+	Bar	2.0 MP		
Nokia 222	240x320	2015	D	GSM, EDGE	Unknown	Series 30+	Bar	2.0 MP		
Nokia 225	240x320	2014	D	GSM, EDGE	MediaTek MT6260	Series 30+	Bar	2.0 MP		
Nokia 225 4G (2020)	240x320	2020	D	GSM, HSPA, LTE	Unisoc UMS9117	Series 30+	Bar	VGA (0.3 MP)		
Nokia 225 4G (2024)	240x320	2024	P	GSM, HSPA, LTE	Unisoc T107	Series 30+	Bar	None		
Nokia 230	240x320	2015	D	GSM, EDGE	MediaTek MT6260CA	Series 30+	Bar	2.0 MP		
Nokia 230 (2024)	240x320	2024	P	GSM	Unisoc 6531F	Series 30+	Bar	2.0 MP		
Nokia 235 4G	240x320	2024	P	GSM, HSPA, LTE	Unisoc T107	Series 30+	Bar	2.0 MP		
Nokia 301	240x320	2013	D	GSM, EDGE, WCDMA, HSDPA, HSUPA	Infineon PMB9803 X-GOLD614, BB5.0	S40 6th Edition Feature Pack 1	Bar	3.2 MP		
Nokia 515	240x320	2013	D	GSM, EDGE, WCDMA, HSDPA, HSUPA	Unknown, BB5.0	S40 6th Edition Feature Pack 1	Bar	5.0 MP		

==== Other phones ====
===== N-Gage – Mobile gaming devices (2003–2004) =====
Phone model	Screen type	Released	Status	Technology	Chipset, HW platform	Form factor	Images
**N-Gage**	176x208 12-bit (4096) Color	2003	D	GSM	Nokia UPP_WD2, DCT4	Bar	
**N-Gage QD**	176x208 12-bit (4096) Color	2004	D	GSM	Nokia UPP_WD2, DCT4	Bar	

===== PCMCIA Cardphones (1997–2003) =====
Phone model	Released	Status	Technology	Generation	Form factor	Images
Cardphone	1997	D	GSM	DCT3	PC card	
Cardphone 2.0	1999	D	GSM	DCT3	PC card	
D211	2001	D	GSM/WLAN	DCT4	PC card	
D311	2003	D	GSM/WLAN	DCT4	PC card	

===== Concept phones =====
Nokia developed a phone concept, never realised as a working device, in the 2008 Nokia Morph.

=== Tablets ===
- Nokia N1

=== VR cameras ===
- Nokia OZO

Power Bank Phones

- Nokia 300 Charge

=== Health ===
The Digital Health division of Nokia Technologies bought the following personal health devices from Withings in 2016. The division was sold back to Withings in 2018.

- Nokia Steel
- Nokia Steel HR
- Nokia Body/Body+/Body Cardio
- Nokia Go
- Nokia Sleep
- Nokia BPM/BPM+
- Nokia Thermo
- Nokia Home

=== Services ===
After the sale of its mobile devices and services division to Microsoft, all of the below services were either discontinued or spun off.

==== Consumer services ====
- Accounts & SSO
- Club Nokia
- Maliit
- Mobile Web Server
- MOSH
- Nokia Accessibility
- Nokia Browser for Symbian
- Nokia Car App
- Nokia Care
- Nokia Conference
- Nokia Business Center
- Nokia Download!
- Nokia Life
- Nokia Lifeblog
- Nokia Mail and Nokia Chat
- Nokia MixRadio
- Nokia Motion Data
- Nokia Motion Monitor
- Nokia network monitor
- Nokia Pure
- Nokia Sensor
- Nokia Sports Tracker
- Nokia Sync
- Nokia Xpress
- OFono
- OTA bitmap
- Ovi
- Plazes
- Smart Messaging
- Twango
- WidSets

==== Nokia imaging apps ====
- Nokia Camera
- Nokia Cinemagraph
- Nokia Creative Studio
- Nokia Glam Me
- Nokia Panorama
- Nokia Refocus
- Nokia Share
- Nokia Smart Shoot
- Nokia Storyteller
- Nokia PhotoBeamer
- Nokia Play To
- Nokia Storyteller
- Nokia Video Director
- Nokia Video Trimmer
- Nokia Video Tuner
- Nokia Video Upload

==== Navigation apps ====
- Boston University JobLens
- HERE.com
- HERE Maps
- HERE Map Creator
- HERE Drive
- HERE Transit
- HERE City Lens
- Nokia Internships Lens
- Nokia JobLens
- Nokia Point & Find

==== Desktop apps ====
- Nokia Software Recovery Tool
- Nokia Software Updater
- Nokia Suite
- Nokia PC Suite

==== Humanitarian services ====
- Nokia Data Gathering
- Nokia Education Delivery
- Nokia Mobile-Mathematics

==== Developer tools ====
- Nokia DVLUP
- Python

==== Websites ====
- Dopplr
- Nokia Beta Labs
- Nokia Conversations
- Nokia Discussions
- Noknok.tv

==== Video gaming ====
- Bounce
- N-Gage
- Nokia Climate Mission
- Nokia Climate Mission 3D
- Nokia Game
- Nokia Modern Mayor
- Snake
- Space Impact

=== Operating systems ===
- Series 30
- Series 30+
- Series 40
- Symbian
  - S60, formerly Series 60
  - Series 80
  - Series 90
- Linux
  - Debian • Maemo 1-5 • MeeGo 1-1.2
  - JAVASmarter • Nokia Asha platform
  - Android • Nokia X platform

=== Security ===
IP appliances run Nokia IPSO FreeBSD based operating system, work with Check Point's firewall and VPN products.

- Nokia IP 40
- Nokia IP 130
- Nokia IP 260
- Nokia IP 265
- Nokia IP 330
- Nokia IP 350
- Nokia IP 380
- Nokia IP 390 (EU Only)
- Nokia IP 530
- Nokia IP 710
- Nokia IP 1220
- Nokia IP 1260
- Nokia IP 2250
- Nokia Horizon Manager
- Nokia Network Voyager

In 2004, Nokia began offering their own SSL VPN appliances based on IP Security Platforms and the pre-hardened Nokia IPSO operating system. Client integrity scanning and endpoint security technology was licensed from Positive Networks.

- Nokia 50s
- Nokia 105s
- Nokia 500s

=== Internet Tablets ===
Nokia's Internet Tablets were designed for wireless Internet browsing and e-mail functions and did not include phone capabilities. The Nokia N800 and N810 Internet Tablets were also marketed as part of Nseries. See the Nseries section.

- Nokia 770 Internet Tablet
- Nokia N800 Internet Tablet
- Nokia N810 Internet Tablet
- Nokia N810 WiMAX Edition

The Nokia N900, the successor to the N810, has phone capabilities and is not officially marketed as an Internet Tablet, but rather as an actual Nseries smartphone.

=== ADSL modems ===
- Nokia M10
- Nokia M11
- Nokia M1122
- Nokia MW1122
- Nokia M5112
- Nokia M5122
- Nokia Ni200
- Nokia Ni500

=== GPS products ===
- Nokia GPS module LAM-1 for 9210(i)/9290 Communicator

- Nokia 5140 GPS Cover
- Nokia Bluetooth GPS module LD-1W
- Nokia Bluetooth GPS module LD-3W*
- Nokia Bluetooth GPS Module LD-4W
- Navigation Kit for Nokia 770 Internet Tablet, including LD-3W GPS receiver and software
- Nokia 330 Navigator, that supports an external TMC module.
- Nokia 500 Navigator

=== WLAN products ===
- Nokia A020 WLAN access point
- Nokia A021 WLAN access point/router
- Nokia A032 WLAN access point
- Nokia C020 PC card IEEE 802.11 2 Mbit/s, DSSS (produced by Samsung)
- Nokia C021 PC card, with external antenna
- Nokia C110 PC card IEEE 802.11b 11 Mbit/s
- Nokia C111 PC card, with external antennas
- Nokia MW1122 ADSL modem with wireless interface
- Nokia D211 WLAN/GPRS PC card

=== Digital television ===
- Nokia DBox
- Nokia DBox2
- Nokia Mediamaster 9200 S
- Nokia Mediamaster 9500 S
- Nokia Mediamaster 9500 C
- Nokia Mediamaster 9600 S
- Nokia Mediamaster 9600 C
- Nokia Mediamaster 9610 S
- Nokia Mediamaster 9800 S
- Nokia Mediamaster 9850 T
- Nokia Mediamaster 9900 S
- Nokia Mediamaster 110 T
- Nokia Mediamaster 210 T
- Nokia Mediamaster 221 T
- Nokia Mediamaster 230 T
- Nokia Mediamaster 260 T
- Nokia Mediamaster 260 C
- Nokia Mediamaster 310 T

=== Military communications and equipment ===
Nokia developed the Sanomalaitejärjestelmä ("Message device system") for the Finnish Defence Forces. It includes:

- Sanomalaite M/90
- Partiosanomalaite
- Keskussanomalaite

For the Finnish Defence force, Nokia also manufactured:

- AN/PRC-77 portable combat-net radio transceiver (under licence, designated LV 217)
- M61 gas mask

=== Telephone switches ===
- Nokia DX 200
- Nokia DX 220
- Nokia DX 220 Compact

=== Computers ===
==== Minicomputers ====
Nokia designed and manufactured a series of minicomputers starting in the 1970s. These included the Mikko series of minicomputers intended for use in the finance and banking industry, and the MPS-10 minicomputer (with an OS programmed in the Ada programming language) which was widely used in major Finnish banks in the late 1980s.

==== Personal computers ====
In the 1980s, Nokia's personal computer division Nokia Data manufactured a series of personal computers by the name of MikroMikko. The MikroMikko series included the following products and product series.

Name	CPU	Memory	Operating system	Year
Mikromikko 1	Intel 8085	64 KB	CP/M 2.2	1981
Mikromikko 2	Intel 80186	128-768 KB	Nokia MS-DOS	1983
Mikromikko 3	Intel 80286	1–4 MB	MS-DOS 3.2, 5.0	1986–1990
Mikromikko 4	Intel 80386	2–64 MB	MS-DOS 3.3, 4.01, OS/2	1989–?

Nokia's PC division was sold to the British computer company ICL in 1991. In 1990, Fujitsu had acquired 80% of ICL plc, which throughout the decade became wholly part of Fujitsu. Personal computers and servers were marketed under the ICL brand; the Nokia MikroMikko line of compact desktop computers continued to be produced at the Kilo factories in Espoo, Finland. Components, including motherboards and Ethernet network adapters were manufactured locally, until production was moved to Taiwan. Internationally the MikroMikko line was marketed by Fujitsu as the ErgoPro.

In 1999, Fujitsu Siemens Computers was formed as a joint venture between Fujitsu Computers Europe and Siemens Computer Systems, wherein all of ICL's hardware business (except VME mainframes) was absorbed into the joint venture. On 1 April 2009, Fujitsu bought out Siemens' share of the joint venture, and Fujitsu Siemens Computers became Fujitsu Technology Solutions. Fujitsu continues to manufacture computers in Europe, including PC mainboards developed and manufactured in-house.

==== Mini laptops ====
On 24 August 2009, Nokia announced that they will be re-entering the PC business with a high-end mini laptop called the Nokia Booklet 3G. It was discontinued a few years later.

=== Computer displays ===
Nokia produced CRT and early TFT LCD Multigraph displays for PC and larger systems application. The Nokia Display Products' branded business was sold to ViewSonic in 2000.

=== Others ===
During the 1990s, Nokia divested itself of the industries listed below to focus solely on telecommunications.

- Aluminium
- Communications cables
- Capacitors
- Chemicals
- Electricity generation machinery
- Footwear (including Wellington boots)
- Military technology and equipment
- Paper products
- Personal computers
- Plastics
- Robotics
- Televisions
- Tires (car and bicycle)

== See also ==
- Nokian Footwear
- Nokian Tyres
  - History of mobile phones
- List of Motorola products
- List of Sony Ericsson products
