= Nokia Talkman 510 =

Discontinued cell phone

- Manufacturer: Nokia-Mobira Company
- First released: 1989
- Compatible networks: NMT 450
- Form factor: brick
- Development status: discontinued

The Nokia Talkman 510 is a brick phone which has been discontinued. The phone is also known by the name 'Dataman'.

The term 'brick' has become popular for explaining phones of a solid, chunky form factor that more closely resembles a brick than a device, something that has become more defined with the evolution of the mobile phone. Such phones have also come to be colloquially known as 'dumbphones', a play on the term 'smartphone'.
