= Nokia 1611 =

Mobile phone model

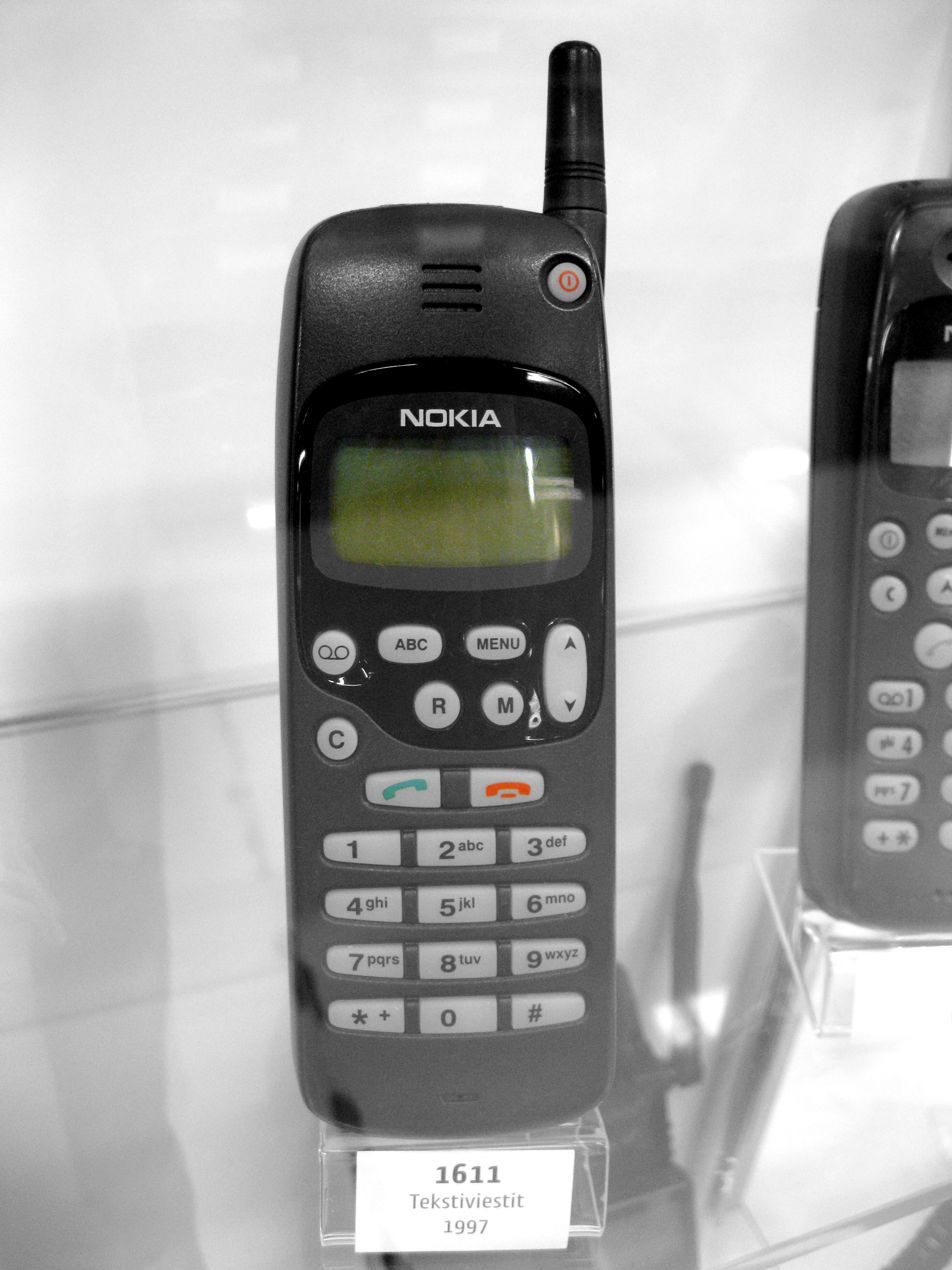
- Manufacturer: Nokia
- Availability by region: 1997
- Removable storage: No card
- Rear camera: No camera
- Display: Monochrome display
- Connectivity: Mobile data
- Data inputs: T9 Keypad

The Nokia 1611 was the world's first solar powered mobile phone. This was achieved using a solar powered battery as one of the battery options. It was announced in January 1997. It added the feature of sending text messages. It used a credit-style full-size sim card. The device came by default with a 600 mAh Ni-Mh battery.
