= Nokia Talkman 620 =

Portable phone

- Manufacturer: Nokia
- First released: 1992
- Compatible networks: NMT 450
- Form factor: portable phone
- Weight: 2kg
- Storage: 98 names
- Battery: stand by (5 h)
- Development status: discontinued

The Nokia Talkman 620 is a portable phone which is discontinued.

== Functions ==
- Power signal received from the base station network
- Keyboard and display lighting
- Duration of the call (call)
- Auto power off function
- Volume control keyboard signals
- Adjustable keyboard sound
- Check the remaining battery
- 8Transmitter power control
- Selection of country code
- Set the block level
- Transfer call to another handset
- Pause
- Memory
- Multi-part transmission in the NMT system
- Last number redial
- Lock keypad
- Clear Display
- Select characters during conversation
- Display angle settings
