= Nokia 110 (2023) =

2023 feature phone

- Brand: Nokia
- Manufacturer: HMD Global
- Type: Feature phone
- First released: June 1, 2023
- Related: Nokia 110 4G (2023)
- Compatible networks: GSM / HSPA / LTE
- Form factor: Bar
- Colors: Charcoal, Cloudy Blue
- Dimensions: 121.5 mm × 50 mm × 14.4 mm (4.78 in × 1.97 in × 0.57 in)
- Weight: 94.5 g (3.33 oz)
- Operating system: S30+
- CPU: Unisoc T107
- Removable storage: microSDHC (up to 32 GB)
- Battery: Li-Ion 1000 mAh (removable)
- Rear camera: QVGA
- Front camera: No
- Display: 1.8 in (46 mm) TFT LCD, 65K colors Resolution: 120 x 160 pixels, 4:3 ratio (~111 ppi density)
- Sound: Loudspeaker, 3.5mm jack
- Connectivity: Bluetooth 5.0, A2DP microUSB 2.0
- Other: Wireless FM radio, Flashlight, MP3 player

The Nokia 110 (2023) is a feature phone branded by Nokia, which comes with an MP3 music player and a QVGA camera. It was released on July 4, 2023 in India, along with the Nokia 110 4G with inbuilt UIP and wireless FM radio.

It was available at Charcoal and Cloudy Blue color options and it was priced at 1,699 rupees. Its battery—with a capacity of 1000 mAh—sustains a 12-day stand-by time and 8 hours of usage in a single full charge. It uses a microUSB 1.1 charging port.
