= Mobira Talkman 450 =

Portable phone

- Manufacturer: Nokia-Mobira Company
- First released: 1985
- Compatible networks: NMT 450
- Form factor: brick
- Development status: discontinued

The Mobira Talkman 450 is a discontinued brick phone manufactured by Mobira and released in 1985.
