= Nokia 6020 =

Cell phone model by Nokia

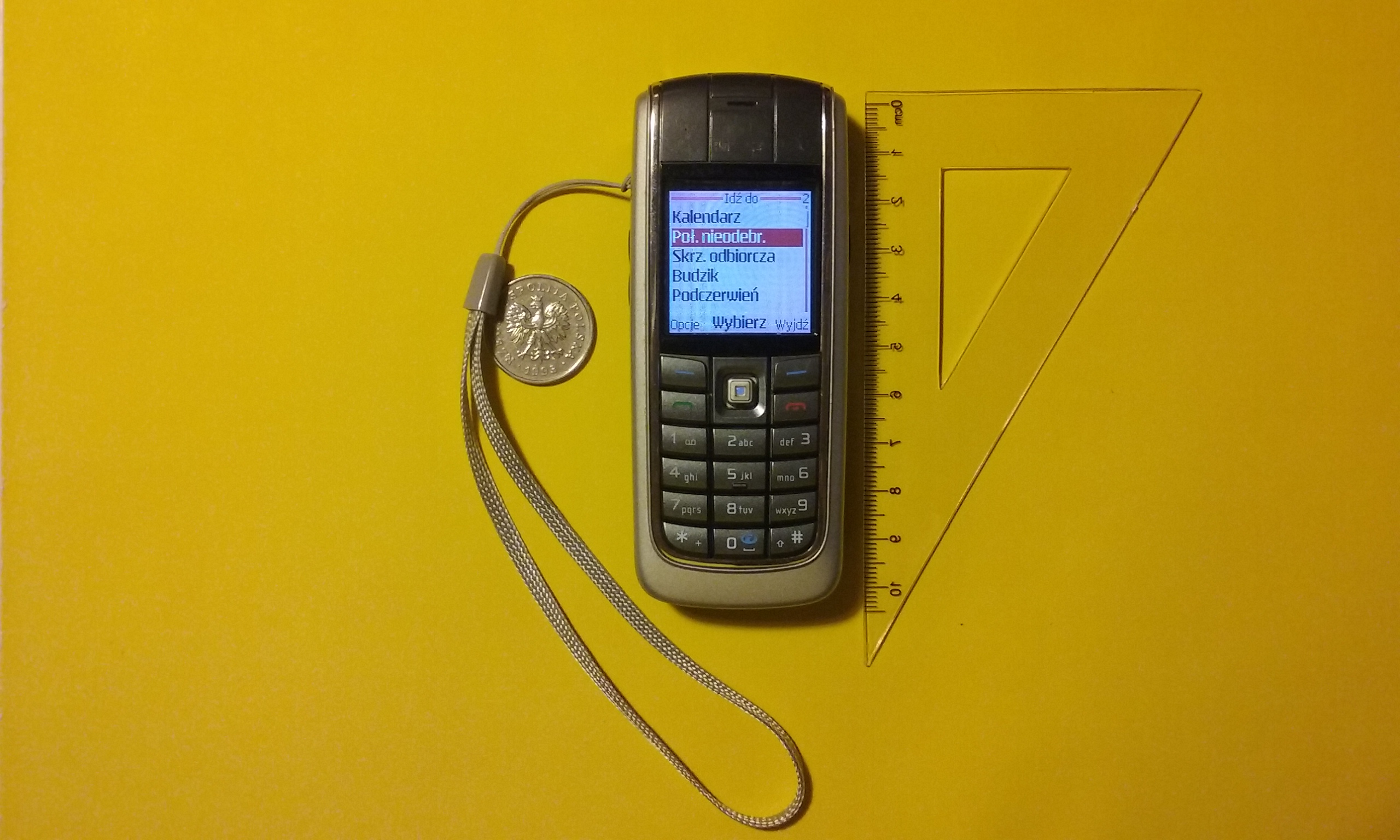
Nokia 6020

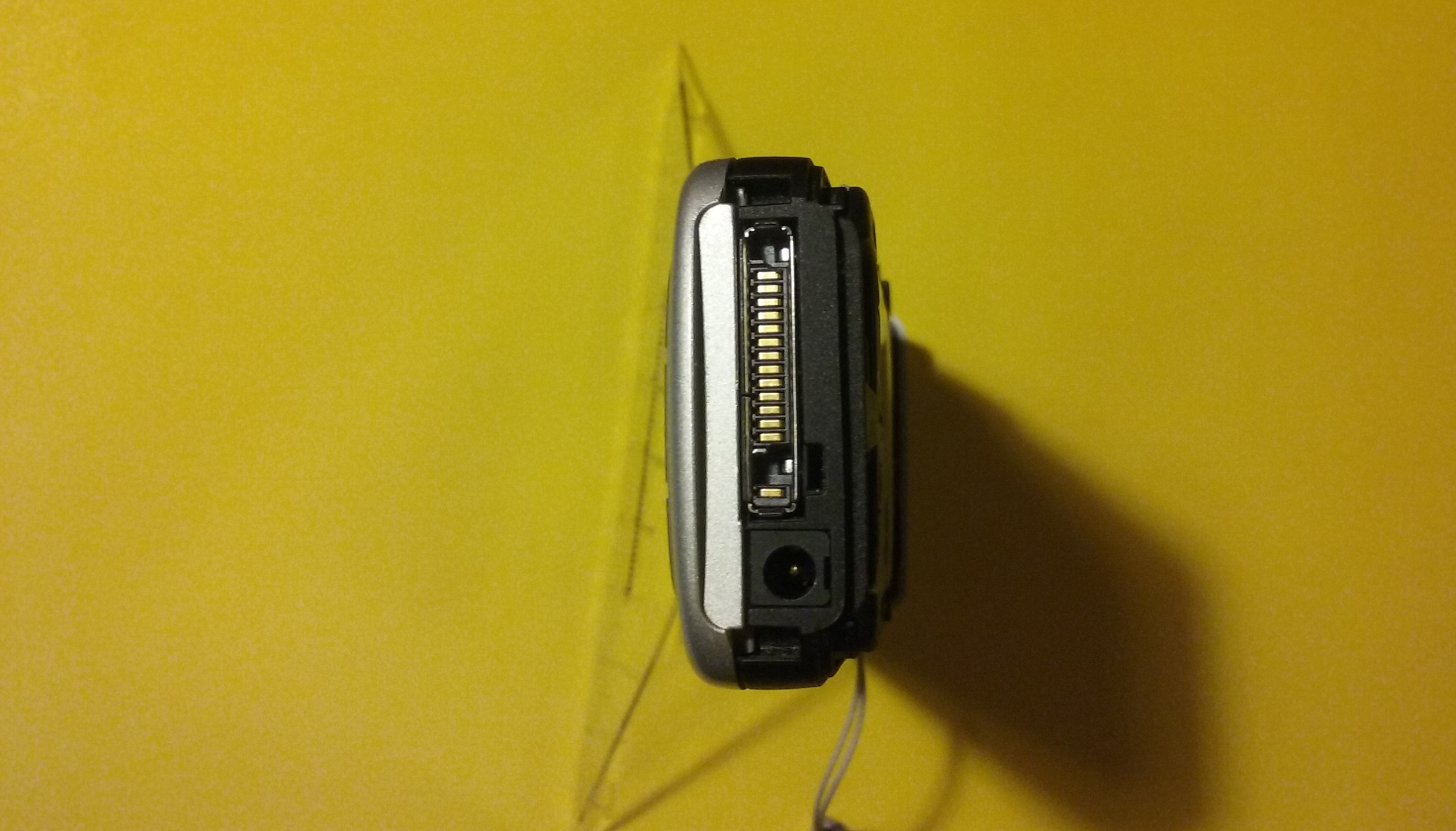
Power (3,5 mm) and data connectors

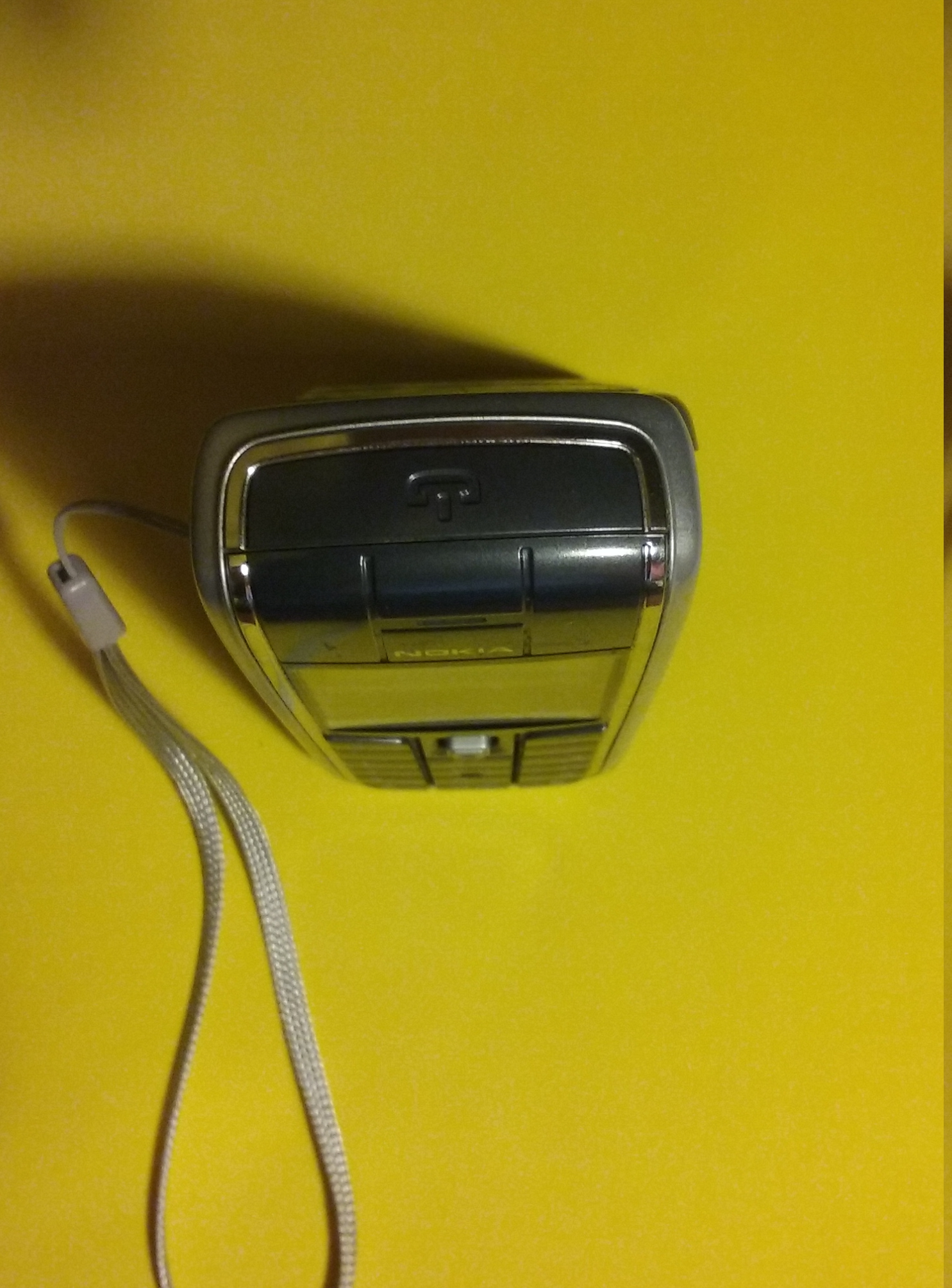
Power button

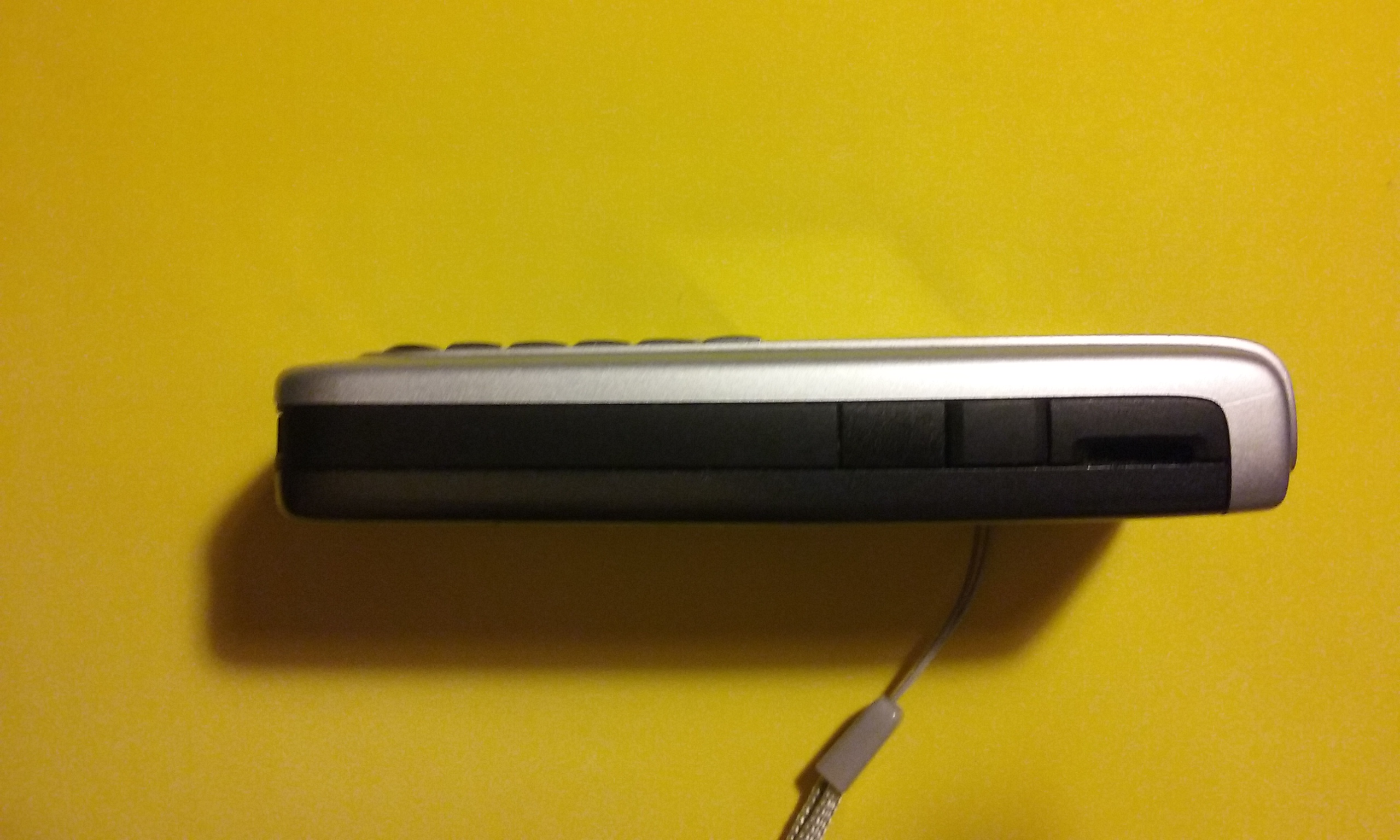
Push to Talk button. Right side view

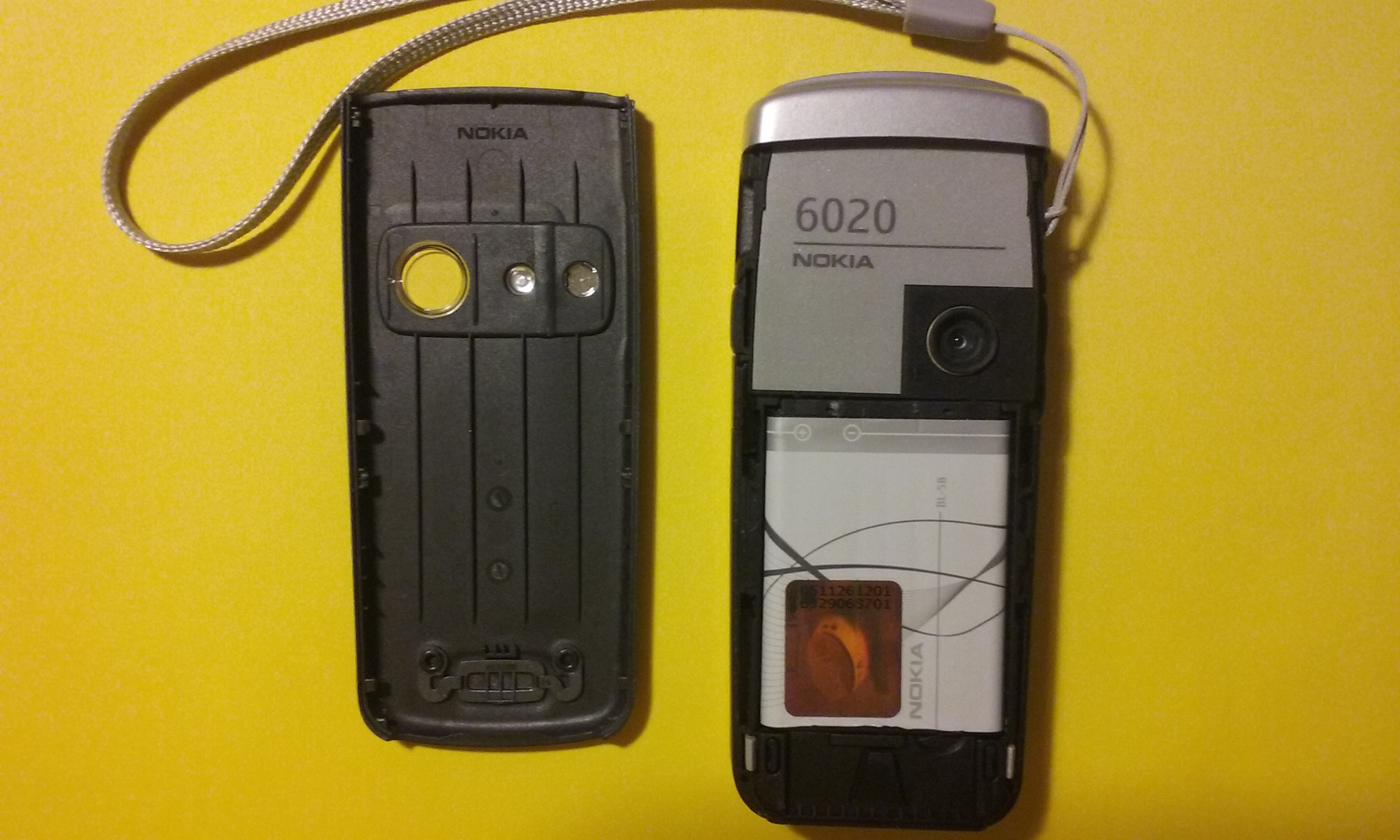
Nokia 6020 with battery BL-5B

The Nokia 6020 and 6021 are feature phones made by Nokia, running the Series 40 platform. The Nokia 6020 has a camera and no Bluetooth support, while the Nokia 6021 has Bluetooth and does not have a camera. The Nokia 6020 was introduced in November 2004, 6021 four months later as a successor of the Nokia 6010 for Americas and the Nokia 3510i and also the Nokia 6230 for the global market. It was succeeded by the Nokia 6070 in 2006.

The Nokia 3220 and 7260 had similar hardware specifications to the 6020, with different software and ringtones installed. The 3220 was mainly marketed towards the youth market, the 6020 mainly towards business users, and the 7260 towards fashion-oriented individuals.

== Features ==
- Keymat with 5-way navigation key
- Captures with the VGA camera and video recorder
- 0.3 megapixel camera which has four modes: Standard, Portrait, Night, and Video
- 3.5 megabytes internal memory
- To transfer data such as photo images, videos and audio clips to a PC it needs a Pop-Port USB Data Cable or the Nokia Connectivity Adapter Cable
- Records up to 50-seconds video clip with sound
- 65,536 colours TFT LCD
- Record up to 5-minute voice recorder
- Push To Talk
- Synchronise data with PC via Nokia PC Suite or remotely with SyncML
- Internet browsing with an XHTML-capable browser, via EDGE and GPRS
- Keeping track of personal finances with Mobile Wallet
- Has infrared to send or receive data to or from other compatible devices like PCs and other phone devices with Infrared connectivity supported
- Supports MP3 ringtones (requires firmware version 4.50 or higher)

== Connectivity ==
- 2G Network
- GSM 900/1800/1900 MHz
- GSM 850/1800/1900 MHz – US version (602xb)
