= Nokia 7250 =

Cell phone model

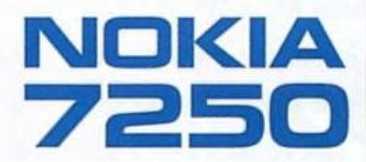

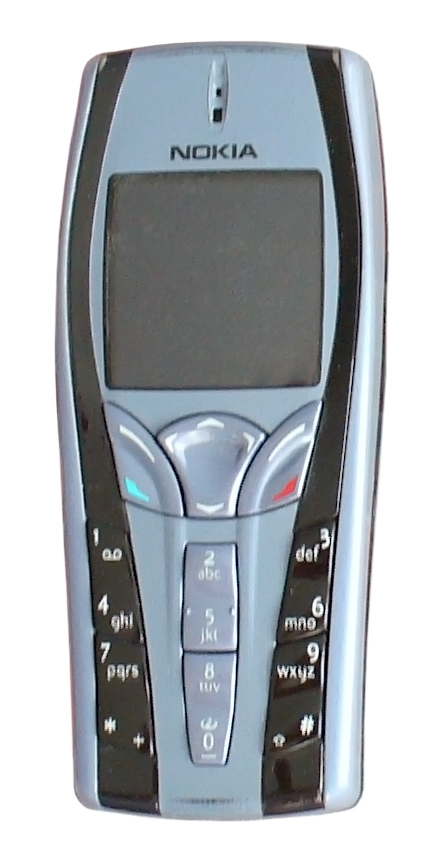
- A Nokia 7250i (variant of 7250)
- Manufacturer: Nokia
- Availability by region: 2003
- Discontinued: 2006
- Predecessor: Nokia 7210 (7250/7250i)
- Successor: Nokia 7260 (7250); Nokia 7610 (7250i)
- Related: Nokia 3200; Nokia 6610i
- Compatible networks: GSM 900/1800/1900
- Form factor: Candybar
- Dimensions: 105×44×19 mm (4.13×1.73×0.75 in)
- Weight: 92 g (3 oz)
- Operating system: Nokia Series 40
- Memory: 5 MB
- Battery: 720 mAh
- Rear camera: 352 x 288 px
- Display: 128 x 128 px
- Connectivity: Pop-Port, InfraRed

The Nokia 7250 is a mobile phone handset manufactured by Nokia. Announced on 4 November 2002 and released for sale in February 2003, it was designed at Nokia Design Center in California, by the Bulgarian-American designer Miki Mehandjiysky. It was the successor of Nokia 7210. The Nokia 7250 is notable for its unconventional design, striking colours and integrated digital camera, and also had Xpress-On covers.

== Features & Specifications ==
- Size: 105 x 44 x 19 mm
- Weight: 92 g
- Battery standby: 150 – 300 hours
- Battery talktime: 2–5 hours
- Tri band
- WAP 1.2.1, GPRS
- High Speed Data (HSCSD) - max 43.2 kilobits per second
- MMS (Multimedia Messaging Service)
- Downloadable Java applications
- Colour display (256 colours, 128 x 128 pixels)
- Polyphonic ringtones (MIDI format)
- 3.5 megabytes shared memory
- Integrated stereo FM radio
- Integrated handsfree speaker
- Changeable x-press on covers
- Nokia Pop-Port connector
- Infra-red and cable connections
- Downloadable colour wallpaper
- Screensaver: digital clock
- Speed dialling
- Phone book (up to 300 entries)
- 2 games (Triple Pop and Bounce)
- Clock, alarm clock, calculator, currency converter

== Nokia 7250i ==
The Nokia 7250i is a slightly improved version of the Nokia 7250, introduced in June 2003. It includes XHTML browser, OMA Forward lock digital rights management, zoom function to magnify images and a more advanced camera. The phone has exactly the same design as the 7250.

The Nokia 6610i was essentially the same phone in terms of features, but featured a more conservative design to appeal more to business users while the 7250i was intended to be a fashion-oriented phone. The Nokia 3200 also had a similar feature set, however, the 3200 was intended to be a more affordable youth-oriented phone and featured a different style graphical user interface derived from that of the Nokia 3100.
