= Nokia 2100 =

2003 cell phone model

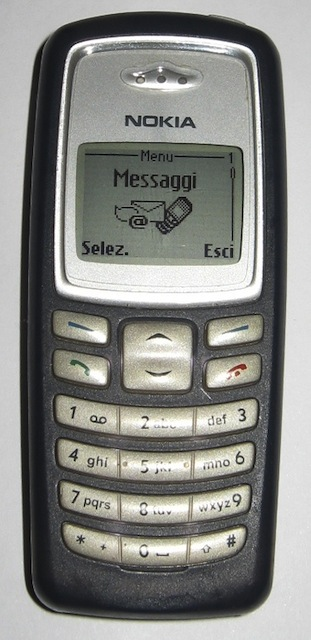
Nokia 2100

The Nokia 2100 is a mobile phone announced on 4 November 2002, and released in Q1 2003 by Nokia as an easy to use, affordable handset especially for emerging markets. It shares a similar button layout, firmware and small dimensions as Nokia 8310. It is rebranded as Nokia 3610 for some markets.

It also included some of the popular Nokia games available, which were Space Impact, Snake II and Link5. Space Impact most notably, included better graphics than the Nokia 3310 and others, but being rather slow and having bad framerate.

Despite having black and white display, and it having low resolution, Nokia 2100 included graphic redactor for images, which people could then save and send via MMS.

On the back it included a slot, in which people could insert a small photograph, or a very slim object, and see it through the plastic cover.

It was succeeded by the Nokia 3510.
