= Nokia 7210 =

Mobile phone released in 2002

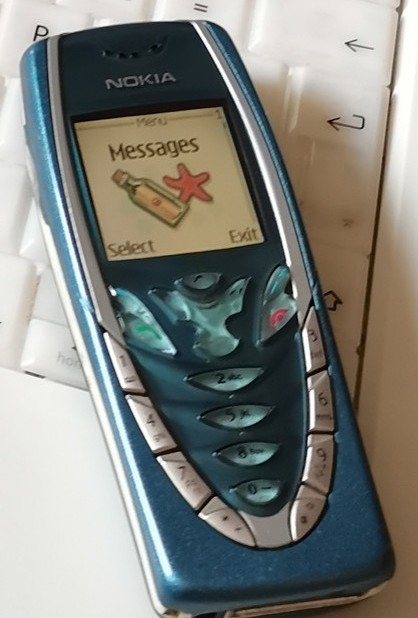
- Nokia 7210 in its turquoise Xpress-On cover
- Manufacturer: Nokia
- Type: Feature phone
- First released: October 2002; 23 years ago
- Discontinued: 2003
- Predecessor: Nokia 8310
- Successor: Nokia 7250
- Related: Nokia 3510; Nokia 6100; Nokia 6610
- Compatible networks: GSM 900/1800/1900; GPRS
- Form factor: Bar
- Dimensions: 106 mm (4.2 in) H 45 mm (1.8 in) W 17.5 mm (0.69 in) D
- Weight: 83 g (2.9 oz)
- Operating system: Series 40 1st Edition
- CPU: 50 MHz UPP8M, ARM7
- Memory: 512 KB SRAM
- Storage: 8 MB
- SIM: miniSIM
- Battery: Nokia BLD-3, 780 mAh, 3.7 V user replaceable Li-ion
- Charging: Nokia 3.5-mm DC Charging Interface
- Display: 1.5 in (38 mm) diagonal CSTN LCD; 128 × 128 px 1:1 aspect-ratio 4096 colors
- Sound: Mono speaker, Pop-Port (Line out)
- Connectivity: IrDA, Pop-Port (FBus)
- Data inputs: Keypad; Push buttons
- Made in: Finland

The Nokia 7210 is a mobile phone handset by Nokia, announced on 12 March 2002. The product succeeded the Nokia 8310 as the company's style and fashionable handset offering. It was Nokia's first phone aimed at the mainstream market to feature a colour display, and it was their first to be built on their all new Series 40 software platform enabled with J2ME (Java).

The device features text and picture messaging, WAP browser, Stereo FM radio, Polyphonic ringtones, two preinstalled games and a 1.5", 128x128 pixel, 4,096 color display. It was the first Nokia phone for the mass market with both a colour display and polyphonic ringtones (the latter had also appeared on Nokia 3510). Nokia 7210 was succeeded by Nokia 7250.

== Features ==
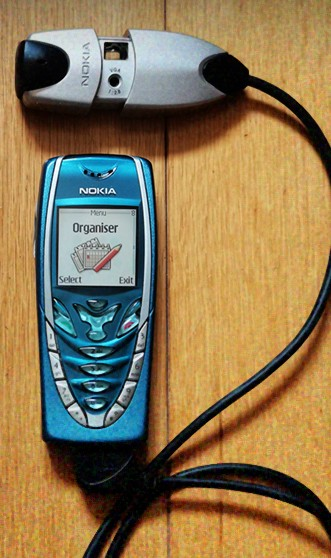
Nokia 7210 with the camera accessory add-on

Standard features for Nokia handsets at the time, the 7210 came with a speakerphone, mute, call conferencing, e-mail support, 300-name phone book, to-do list, calendar, calculator, currency converter, stopwatch, and an alarm clock. Nokia's PC Suite software for the 7210 allowed for wireless syncing of phone book, calendar, and to-do list via IR or an optional USB connectivity kit.

The 7210 featured an all-new front cover design, with a unique keypad layout incorporating a 4-way scroll button. The phone came in a choice of colours, with changeable Xpress-on covers available. Eight colour schemes are available along with the ability to download images to save as wallpaper to add even more personalization.

The Nokia 6610 was essentially the same phone feature-wise, but with a more conservative design aimed at business users, while the 7210 was aimed at fashion-conscious users.

== Entertainment ==
The 7210 came installed with two games; Triple Pop and Bounce. Downloadable ring tones and images were available, until the limit of the phone's 725KB of memory was reached in addition to the 32 tones (plus vibrate) and 10 picture messages already on board. The phone was also J2ME compatible, meaning games and applications could be downloaded via GPRS. The 7210 had a built-in FM radio and also included in the box was an earboom headset. An alternative two-bud-style stereo version was available.

== Release problems ==
The phone was not released until the fourth quarter of 2002. In the UK, operator O2 put the 7210 release on hold due to software issues in the handset while T-Mobile withdrew sales in December 2002 because of "continued instability" in the software of the handsets. It said it aimed to relaunch the handset in January 2003 if the problems were fixed.

== Nokia 7210 Supernova ==
The Nokia 7210 Supernova (model 7210c) is a slim, fashion-oriented feature phone originally released in September 2008. It was part of Nokia's "Supernova" range, marketed for its stylish design and compact form factor.
