= 3110 =

3110 may refer to:

- A.D. 3110, a year in the 4th millennium CE
- 3110 BC, a year in the 4th millennium BCE
- 3110, a number in the 3000 (number) range

== Other uses ==
- 3110 Wagman, an asteroid in the Asteroid Belt, the 3110th asteroid registered
- Nokia 3110, a cellphone
- Nokia 3110 classic, a cellphone
- Texas Farm to Market Road 3110, a state highway
