= 5070 =

5070 most commonly refers to:

- 5070, a number in the 5000 (number) range
- A.D. 5070, a year of the 6th millennium CE
- 5070 BCE, a year in the 6th millennium BC

5070 may also refer to:

== Other uses ==
- 5070 Arai, an asteroid in the Asteroid Belt, the 5070th asteroid registered
- Tobu 5070 series, an electric multiple unit train series
- Nokia 5070, a cellphone
- 5070th Air Defense Wing of the U.S. Air Force
- GeForce RTX 5070, a graphics card
