= Nokia 6070 =

Mobile phone

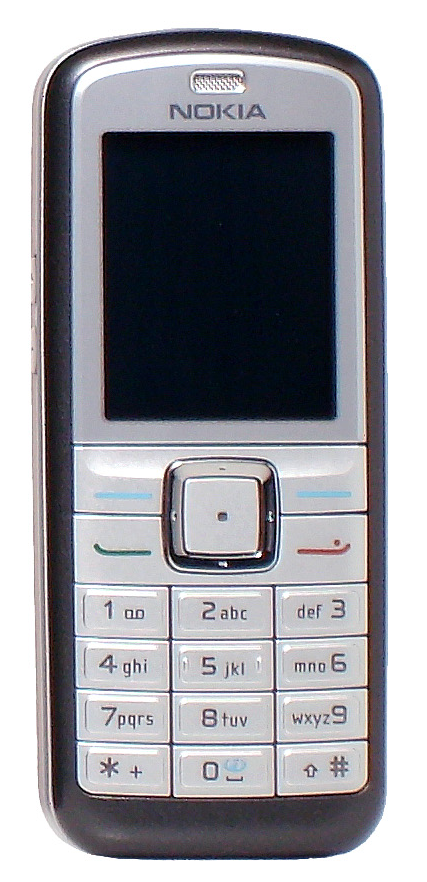
- Nokia 6070
- Manufacturer: Nokia
- First released: February 2006
- Discontinued: Q2/Q3 2009
- Predecessor: Nokia 6020; Nokia 6030; Nokia 6230
- Successor: Nokia 6300; Nokia 3110 classic Nokia 3500 classic
- Related: Nokia 5070; Nokia 6080
- Compatible networks: GSM 900 1800 1900; GSM 850 1900
- Dimensions: 105.4 mm (4.15 in) H 44.3 mm (1.74 in) W 18.6 mm (0.73 in) D
- Weight: 88 g (3.1 oz)
- Operating system: Series 40 2nd edition
- Battery: BL-5B
- Rear camera: VGA
- Display: 128x160 px CSTN
- Connectivity: Infrared; Pop-port
- Data inputs: Keypad
- Other: FM radio Voice recording

The Nokia 6070 is a mobile phone made by Nokia. It operates on GSM tri band frequency 900, 1800 and 1900 MHz (850 and 1900 MHz in the US model), with automatic switching between frequencies. It is small in size with dimensions of 105.4 x 44.3 x 18.6 mm and weights 88 grams. It was released in April 2006. The phone runs using Nokia S40 second edition. The features include a VGA camera, FM radio and voice recording.

== Key features ==
- 128x160 CSTN display
- MMS (max. 150 kb)
- SMS
- GPRS and WAP 2.0 services
- EDGE (Enhanced Data rates for GSM Evolution) compatibility
- Address book, calendar, and reminders
- Java ME
- Push-to-talk
- xHTML web browser
- E-mail support for POP3 and IMAP4 networks
- Integrated VGA camera for taking videos and still images
- FM radio (with headset)
- Infrared
- Nokia Series 40 Theme compatibility
- Loud speaker (can be used for calls)
- Pop-port connector
- Synchronisation support
- Instant messaging
- Next G Networking

== Supported media formats ==
- Images: .bmp, .jpg, .gif, .png, .tiff
- Tones: .nrt (Nokia Ringing Tune), .mid, .mp3, .amr
- Video: .3gp
- Themes: .nth (Nokia Themes)
- Applications: .jar
- Web pages: XHTML, HTML

== Known issues ==
- When installing applications whose size is 130-150kb using the Nokia PC suite, an error message appears saying that the file is too large to be installed on the phone although the maximum size that can be installed on the Nokia 6070 is 150kb. Applications which have a size of 130-150kb can be installed via OTA (over-the-air) download using GPRS.
- Sometimes, when the phone is using GPRS and the memory is about to become full (due to the internet cache being enabled), the phone crashes and White Screen of Death appears.
- When accessing the text message inbox whilst receiving a text message at the same time, the phone crashes and the White Screen of Death appears.
- Some users reported that they got a Nickel allergy because of too much exposure of the user's fingers to the navigation key which is made from nickel although, it is documented in the user's manual that users must avoid too much exposure to nickel which may lead to an allergic reaction. Several new Nokia phones in the market use the same navigation key as in Nokia 6070 to presumably cut cost.

== Reception ==
Tracey Smith for TechRadar gave the phone four stars.

== Related phones ==
- Nokia 5070
- Nokia 6080
