= Field test =

Field Test is a short film, part of Batman: Gotham Knight. Field test may also refer to:

- Field test, a field experiment
- Field test mode (FTM), or field test display (FTD), a software application often pre-installed on mobile phones that provides the user with technical details, statistics relating to the mobile phone network, and the ability to run hardware tests on the phone
- Visual field test, an eye examination that can detect dysfunction in central and peripheral vision

== See also ==
- Field testing
- Open field test in animal research
- Field (disambiguation)
- Test (disambiguation)
