= Nokia 6510 =

Nokia mobile phone

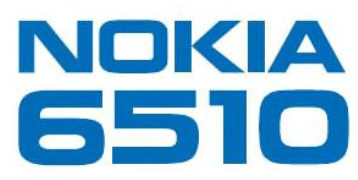

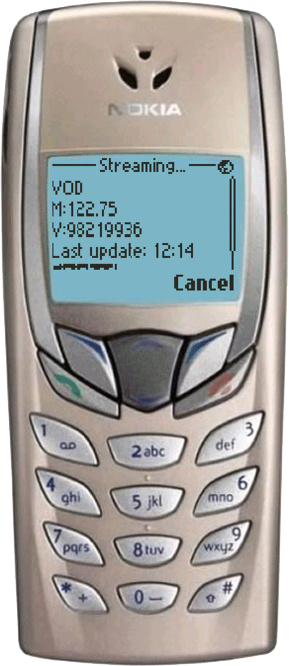
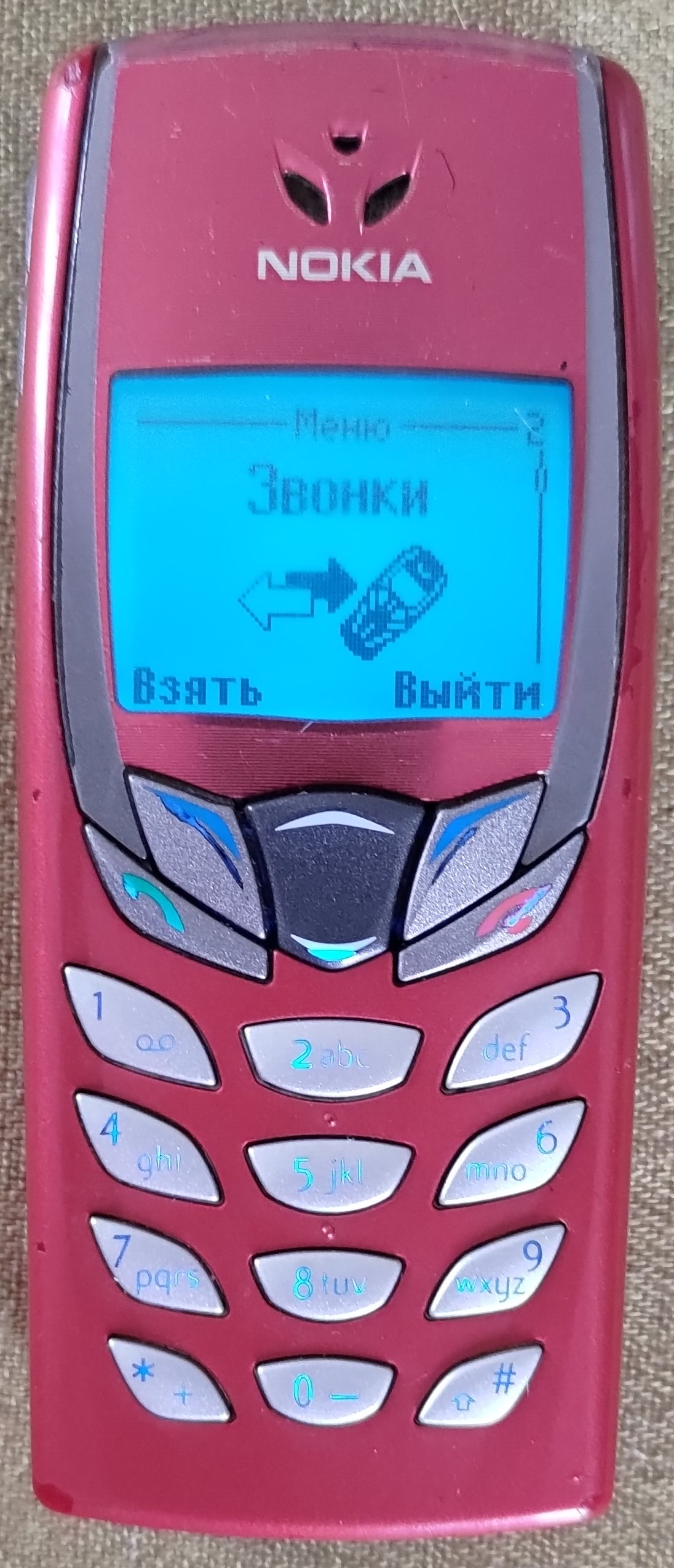
- Top: An image depicting a gold Nokia 6510 streaming an update. Bottom: A real-life photo of a Nokia 6510 in red.
- Manufacturer: Nokia
- Availability by region: Q1 2002
- Discontinued: 2005
- Predecessor: Nokia 8265 (6510); Nokia 8265i (6500); Nokia 8280 (6590); Nokia 8280i (6590i)
- Successor: Nokia 6100 (6510); Nokia 6108 (6500); Nokia 6610 (6590); Nokia 6610i (6590i)
- Related: Nokia 8310
- Compatible networks: GSM 900/1800
- Dimensions: 97×43×20 mm (3.82×1.69×0.79 in), 67 cc
- Weight: 84 g (3 oz)
- Battery: Standard, 750 mAh Li-Ion (BLB-2)
- Display: Monochrome graphic, 96 x 65 pixels, 5 lines
- Connectivity: GPRS, Infrared port

The Nokia 6510 is a mobile phone announced on November 19, 2001 and launched in the first quarter of 2002.

It was an improved version of the Nokia 8310. It featured a higher resolution screen with teal, instead of white, backlit illumination, and blue keypad illumination. It also featured several new applications, such as the electronic wallet, used to store password protected information, and an upgraded calendar.

As a business-oriented product, it incorporated a more restrained look, although the covers were interchangeable with the 8310.

== Variants ==
- 6500 (type NHM-7) - Asia-exclusive variant with a flip cover for the keypad. Shares the same type code and lower-resolution 84x48 screen with the 8310.
- 6590/6590i (type NSM-9NX) - North American version of the 6510 with different bands. The 6590i is the revised version of the 6590.
