= Nokia 3200 =

Mobile phone

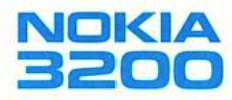

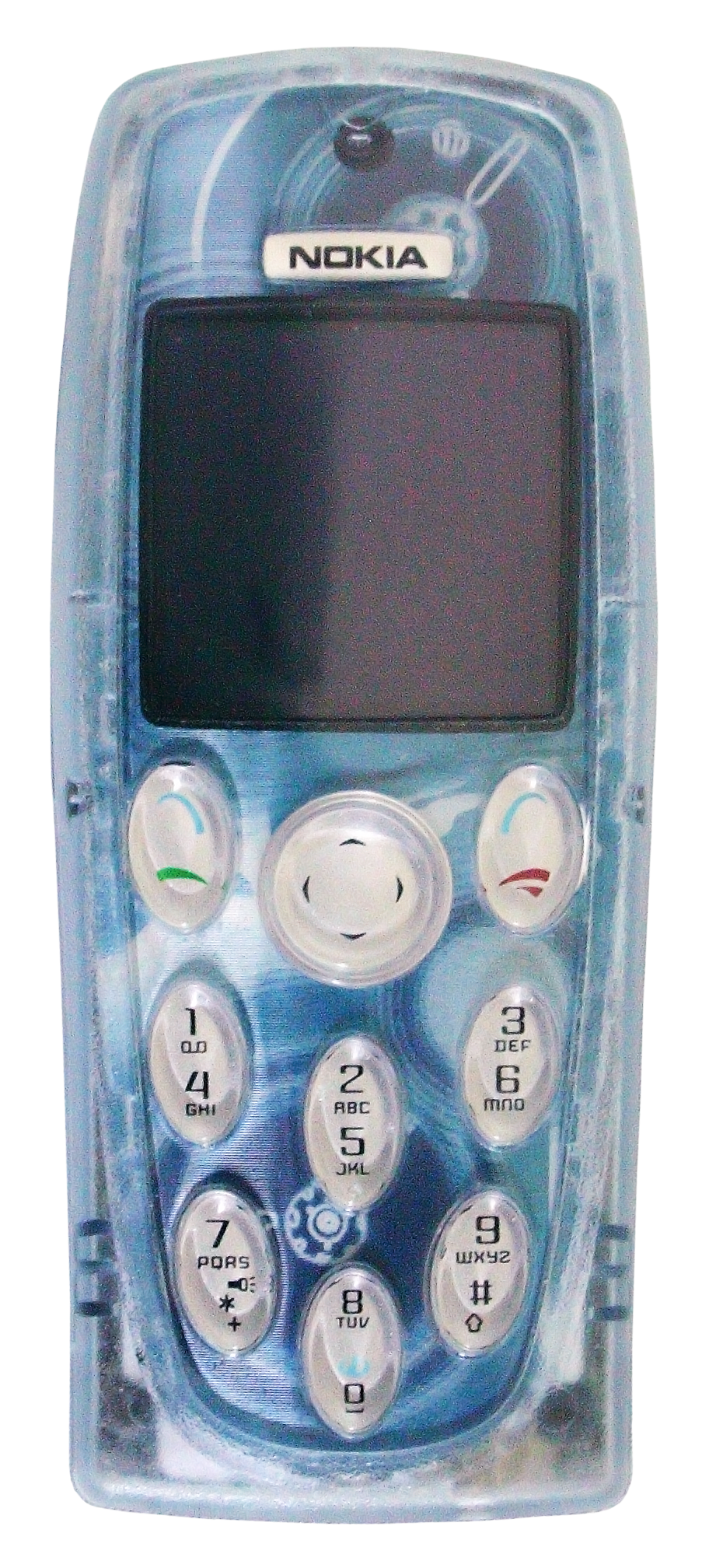
- Manufacturer: Nokia
- First released: September 2003
- Predecessor: Nokia 3100 (3200); Nokia 3105 (3205)
- Successor: Nokia 3220
- Related: Nokia 6610i Nokia 7250i
- Compatible networks: GSM 900/1800/1900 (3200); GSM 850/1800/1900 (3200b); CDMA 800/1900 AMPS 800 (3205)
- Form factor: Candybar
- Dimensions: 107 mm (4.2 in) H 45 mm (1.8 in) W 20.8 mm (0.82 in) D
- Weight: 90 g (3.2 oz) (3200); 96 g (3.4 oz) (3205)
- Operating system: Series 40 1st Edition
- Memory: 1MB
- Battery: BLD-3 780 mAh
- Rear camera: 352 × 288 CIF (3200); 640 × 480 VGA (3205)
- Display: 128 × 128 12-bit (4096) color CSTN
- Connectivity: IrDA

The Nokia 3200 is a mobile phone by Nokia, part of the Nokia Expression (youth) series and announced on 12 September 2003. It is based on the Nokia Series 40 platform.

The phone is an update of the Nokia 3100, while adding features from the Nokia 7250i and 6610i. The phone's feature set was very similar to the 7250i and 6610i, but featured different software and firmware installed, and was sold at a lower price than the 7250i or 6610i. Of the three phones, the 3200 was mainly targeted towards the youth market, the 7250i towards fashion-conscious users, and the 6610i towards business users. Core features include an XHTML browser, alarm clock, flashlight, EDGE and FM stereo radio with a 128×128 12-bit (4096) color screen. The phone has multimedia features such as picture and text messaging. Features carried over from the Nokia 3100 include ringer profiles and voice memo capability. It also has Java games (max downloadable size of game or application cannot exceed 64 kB). The phone has an extensive calendar with a lunar calendar (for the Chinese/Asian variants). The flashlight is located under the phone and can be activated by holding the "star" (asterisk) key. The camera is on the back of the phone. The 3200 can also play both polyphonic and monophonic ringtones. The phone's visual interface in its menu system is similar to that of the Nokia 3100, using large, static icons rather than animated ones.

An interesting feature present in this phone is that the face plate system allows users to print out their own cut-out cover designs and use it in the phone. The official special released designs include "Snowboard," "Street life," and "Urban chic." It was thus marketed as being "fun and funky" with a unique style.

While the phone's feature set was an improvement over the Nokia 3100, the 3200 did not quite enjoy the popularity that the 3100 did. Some known complaints with the phone included its low CIF resolution camera, quirky keypad design, and its small 12-bit color display. This kept the 3100, and its redesign, the 3120, in production, while the 3200 was discontinued and replaced by its successor, the Nokia 3220. The Nokia 3220 addresses some of the 3200's known flaws, upgrading to a higher VGA resolution camera with video recording capability, redesigning the keypad to a more standard layout, and improving the display to a 16-bit color LCD.

== Versions ==
- Nokia 3200b (RH-31) for North America - Operates on GSM 850/1800/1900 with GPRS and EDGE technology.
- Nokia 3200 (RH-30) for Europe / Asia - Operates on GSM 900/1800/1900 with GPRS and EDGE technology.
- Nokia 3205 - Operates on CDMA2000 800/1900 and AMPS 800 with CDMA2000 1xRTT technology. Features a VGA camera, a timer and night mode.

To check version, type *#0000# while phone is powered on.

== Reception ==
Kent German of CNET gave the phone 3.5 out of 5 stars, lauding its extensive personalization options, its ability to send and receive instant messages, built-in speakerphone FM radio, decent battery life, infra-red port, and compatibility with the EDGE network, while panning its "somewhat flimsy" plastic casing, "confusing" keypad layout, "unintuitive" multimedia messaging, "basic" CIF camera, and its 1 MB of shared memory.

The PhoneArena team was more positive, giving the phone a 7 out of 10. Unlike CNET, they said camera was of "satisfactory" quality and its battery life was "good." They further praised its flashlight, FM radio, and speakerphone; however, they panned its lack of appeal for the youth market with its "same old form factor" with the "same old series 40 graphic platform."
