= Nokia 6030 =

Mobile phone model

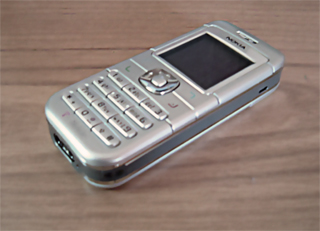
- Nokia 6030B (Silver)
- Manufacturer: Nokia
- Predecessor: Nokia 6010
- Successor: Nokia 6070
- Compatible networks: GSM 900/1800; GSM 850/1900
- Dimensions: 104 mm (4.1 in) H 44 mm (1.7 in) W 18 mm (0.71 in) D
- Weight: 90 g (3.2 oz)
- Display: 128×128 px 65K colors
- Connectivity: FBus

The Nokia 6030, introduced in Q1 2005, is a GSM dual band handset operating on frequencies 900 and 1800 MHz (850 and 1900 MHz in the North American model), with automatic switching between frequencies. It is small in size with dimensions of 104 x 44 x 18 mm and weighs 90 grams. It also has 3 MB Shared Memory.

Its key features are:

- High-resolution color display with up to 65,536 colors (128 x 128 pixels)
- Multimedia messaging (MMS)
- GPRS and WAP 2.0 services
- Nokia Series 40 Theme compatibility
- FM radio (with supported Nokia headset)
- MIDI audio playback (up to 16 channels)
- Address book, calendar, and reminders
- Java ME compatibility
- Xpress-on covers

The 6030 supports GPRS up to 40 kbit/s speed and Wireless Application Protocol (WAP) 2.0 services. An XHTML browser is integrated, allowing for WAP web capability. The phone book can hold up to 300 entries and its calendar can hold up to 500 entries. It has been proven to be a very durable phone, with users reporting dropping it several times, throwing it across a room, dropping it into water, etc. with the phone still running afterward.

On the bottom panel of the Nokia 6030 is a 4-pin connector similar to a USB port, a bit smaller than normal 4-pin mini-USB connectors, but it is an FBus port, named the EZ Flash port, and the data cable for this port is not supplied for end-users. There is no official data cable connection for 6030 end-user.

== Reception ==
CNET gave a rating of six out of ten and called it "a basic phone that’s actually stylish". PCMag gave a rating of 3.5 out of 5 and said: "The Nokia 6030 offers good looks, sound, and battery life for a bargain price."
