= Nokia 6100 =

Cell phone model

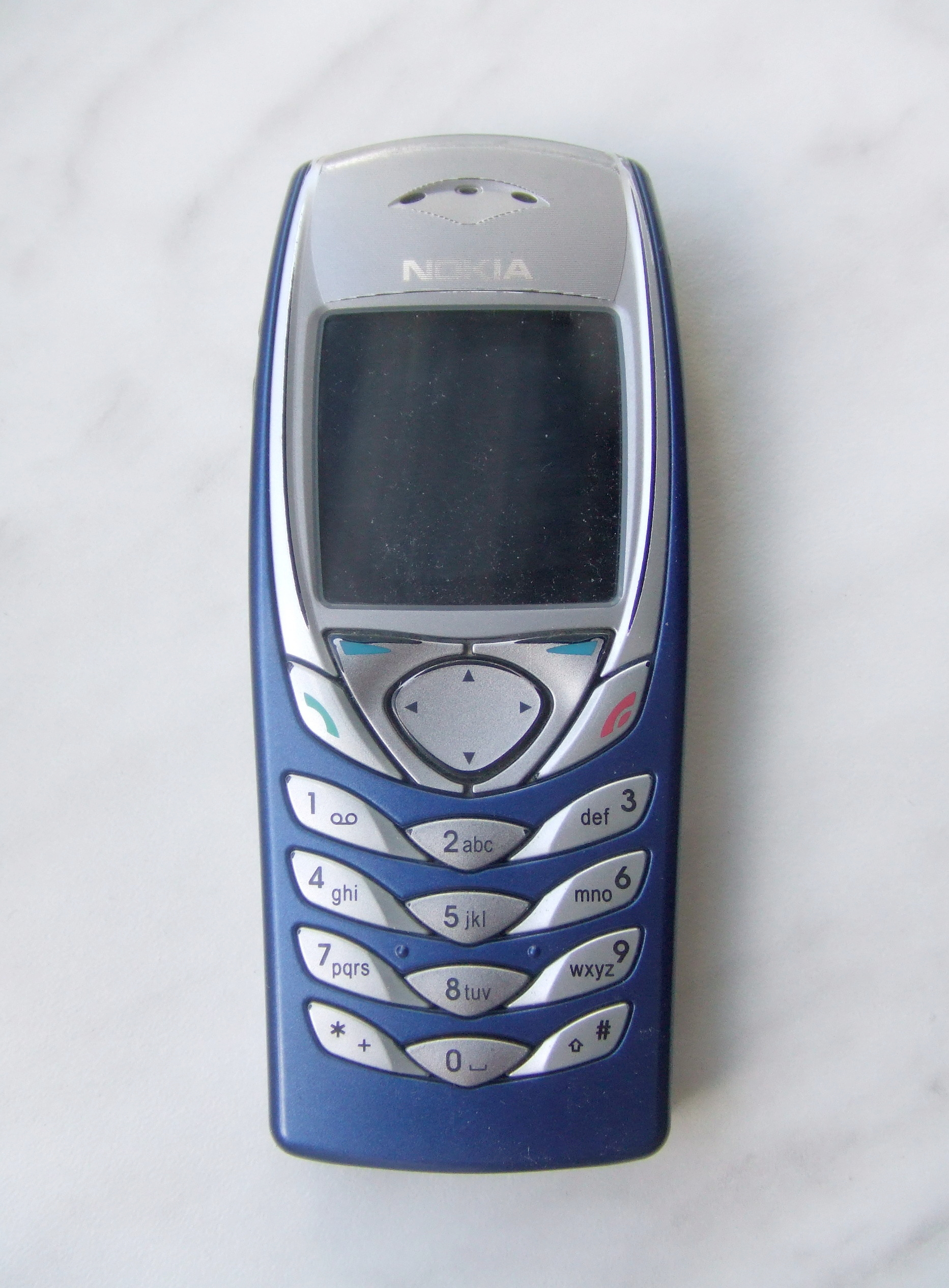
- Manufacturer: Nokia
- Type: Feature phone
- First released: 2002; 24 years ago
- Discontinued: 2005
- Successor: Nokia 6300
- Related: Nokia 3100; Nokia 6610
- Compatible networks: GSM 900/1800/1900; GPRS
- Form factor: Bar
- Dimensions: 102 mm (4.0 in) H 44 mm (1.7 in) W 13.5 mm (0.53 in) D
- Weight: 76 g (2.7 oz)
- Operating system: Series 40 1st Edition
- CPU: 50 MHz UPP8M, ARM7
- Memory: 512 KB SRAM
- Storage: 8 MB
- SIM: miniSIM
- Battery: Nokia BL-4C, 760 mAh, 3.7 V user replaceable Li-ion
- Charging: Nokia 3.5-mm DC Charging Interface
- Display: 1.5 in (38 mm) diagonal CSTN LCD; 128 × 128 px 1:1 aspect-ratio 4096 colors
- Sound: Mono speaker, Pop-Port (Line out)
- Connectivity: IrDA, Pop-Port (FBus)
- Data inputs: Keypad; Push buttons
- Made in: Germany

The Nokia 6100 is a popular mid-range Nokia mobile phone that was available from 2002 to 2005. It was announced on 4 September 2002 (together with Nokia 7250).

The Nokia 6100 was Nokia's lightest phone with a full 12-key keypad at the time. Combined with its battery, it weighs only 76 grams (2.7 ounces) and measures 102 mm × 44 mm × 13.5 mm (4.02 in × 1.73 in × 0.53 in). Its smaller size compared with other contemporary phones might make it difficult for the elderly, or people with large fingers, to use its keypad. The phone supports Xpress-On covers, and is packaged along with any of 4 colours. Its feature set is very similar to the Nokia 7210, although with a more conservative design.

The Nokia 6100 has a display with a resolution of 128 x 128 pixels, featuring 12-bit color (allowing for 4096 possible colors). Its features include Internet connectivity via GPRS, an infrared port, inbuilt calendar and polyphonic ring tones. It does not have a camera. It could be considered the true successor of the Nokia 8210 and Nokia 8250 in terms of design functionality and its small flat size.

The LCD screen comes in two main versions which are very similar. One version of the LCD is controlled by an EPSON S1D15G00 driver chip, whilst the other version uses a Philips PCF8833 instead. There are also clones of these drivers. Early releases had a slightly blurry, yellower and duller screen compared with the Nokia 7210 and 6610 of the same period, but later screens improved this shortcoming.

Both driver chips allow the display to be used with 8-bit (256 colors) or 12-bit (4096 colors) RGB. Only the Philips version provides, on a low-level, the ability to use 16-bit RGB. This is achieved through dithering. 16-bit RGB gives 65536 different colors, sixteen times that available in the Nokia 12-bit RGB colour mode.
