= Nokia 3500 classic =

Mobile phone model

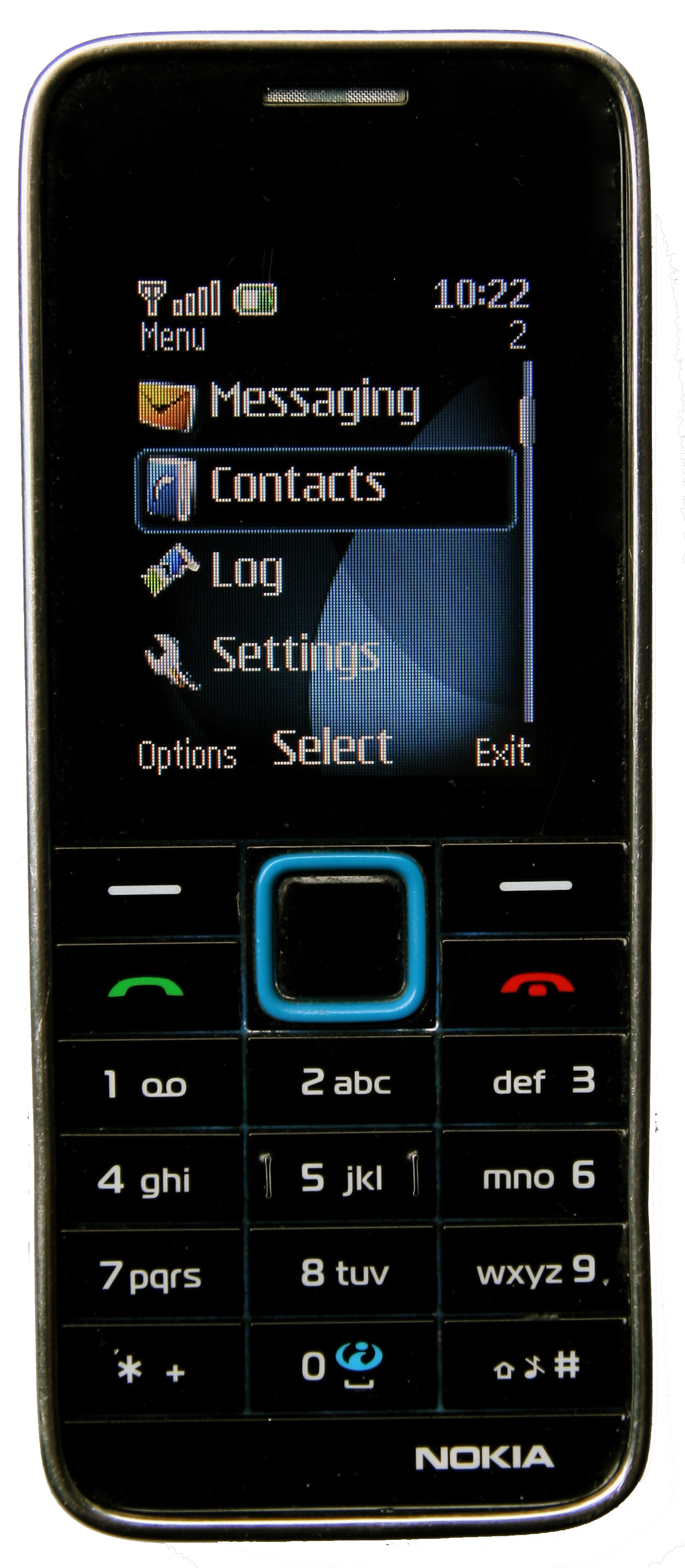
- Manufacturer: Nokia
- Availability by region: June 2007
- Predecessor: Nokia 5070; Nokia 3100
- Successor: Nokia 5220; Nokia 208; Nokia 3120 classic
- Related: Nokia 3110 classic
- Compatible networks: GPRS, EDGE, EGPRS, HSCSD, CSD, GSM 900, GSM 1800, GSM 1900
- Form factor: Candybar
- Colors: Grey, Pink, Mandarine, Azure Blue
- Dimensions: 107×45×13.1 mm (4.21×1.77×0.52 in), 59 cc
- Weight: 81 g (3 oz)
- Operating system: Series 40
- Memory: 32 MB of flash memory and 16 MB of RAM (internal), 8.5 MB user memory
- Removable storage: microSD (up to 2 GB)
- Battery: Standard battery, Li-Ion BL-4C 860 mAh; Stand-by Up to 300 h Talk time Up to 3 h
- Rear camera: 2.0 megapixels
- Display: 1.8 inch 128x160 pixels TFT LCD (262,000 colors)
- Connectivity: Bluetooth 2.0 with A2DP, Mini USB, Stereo FM radio with Nokia Audio Visual Plug 2.5mm
- Data inputs: Keypad
- Development status: Discontinued
- Other: Game: Yes + downloadable

The Nokia 3500 classic is a mobile phone, manufactured by Nokia and was released for sale in 2007. It is an upgrade to the Nokia 3110 classic released earlier in 2007 and successor to the 2006 models Nokia 6070 and 5070, featuring improvements such as a 2-megapixel camera and redesigned frame with more color options.
