= Nokia 3610 =

Mobile phone model

- Manufacturer: Nokia
- First released: 2002
- Predecessor: Nokia 8250
- Successor: Nokia 6610
- Related: Nokia 2100
- Compatible networks: GSM 900/GSM 1800
- Form factor: Candybar
- Dimensions: 105 mm × 45 mm × 22 mm (4.13 in × 1.77 in × 0.87 in)
- Weight: 92 g (3.2 oz)
- Operating system: Series 30 or Series 40 1st Edition
- Removable storage: No
- Battery: BLB-2, 830 mAh
- Display: 96x65 Monochrome

The Nokia 3610 is a mobile phone by Nokia, announced and released in 2002.
