= Nokia 5070 =

Mobile phone model

- Manufacturer: Nokia
- Successor: Nokia 3500 classic
- Related: Nokia 6070; Nokia 6080
- Compatible networks: GSM 900 1800 1900; GSM 850 1900 (US); GPRS multislot class 10, max. 80 kbit/s EDGE multislot class 6, max. 177,6 kbit/s
- Dimensions: 105.4 mm (4.15 in) H 44.3 mm (1.74 in) W 18.6 mm (0.73 in) D
- Weight: 88 g (3.1 oz)
- Operating system: Series 40
- Rear camera: 640x480 px VGA
- Display: 128×160 px 65k colors
- Connectivity: Infrared; Pop-port

The Nokia 5070 is a mobile phone made by Nokia. It operates on GSM tri band frequency 900, 1800 and 1900 MHz (850 and 1900 MHz in the US model), with automatic switching between frequencies.

== Key features ==
- High-resolution color display with up to 65,536 colors (128 x 160 pixels)
- VGA (640*480 pixels) resolution camera with video capability
- Multimedia messaging (MMS)
- GPRS and WAP 2.0 services
- EDGE (Enhanced Data rates for GSM Evolution) compatibility
- USB Connectivity (Pop-Port)
- Infrared
- Nokia Series 40 Theme compatibility
- FM radio (with headset)
- MP3 ringtones
- Address book, calendar, and reminders
- Java ME compatibility
- PTT (Push-To-Talk)
- xHTML web browser

The 5070 supports:

- EDGE multislot class 6, max. 177,6 kbit/s
- GPRS multislot class 10, max. 80 kbit/s

== Reception ==
The Nokia 5070 has mixed reviews. CNET gave the device a 6.5/10, describing it as a "cheap and chunky handset" and praising its color scheme. Trusted Reviews gave the phone a three-star review and noted the size of the keypad. The camera was criticized for its low resolution and low frame rate on videos. The phone's display was also poorly received due to its 65-thousand color count and the slow responsiveness in menus. CNET praised the call quality and cell reception of the handset. The inclusion of an FM radio is described as a "welcome up-market feature".
