= Nokia 6310 =

Business-oriented mobile phone

Nokia 6310i

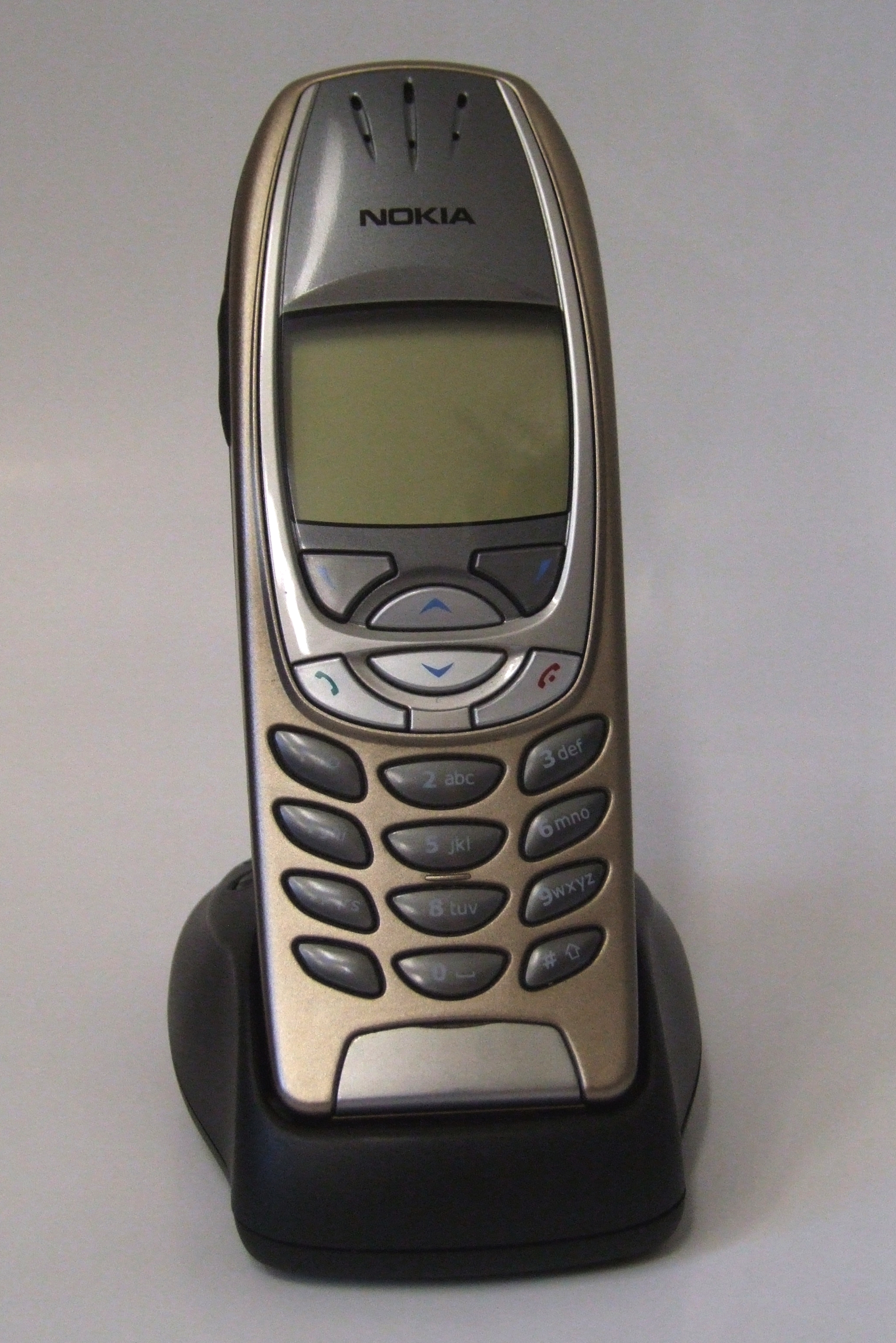
- Nokia 6310i model (with the blue backlight display)
- Manufacturer: Nokia
- First released: November 2001 (6310); Q2 2002 (6310i)
- Discontinued: 2005
- Predecessor: Nokia 6210
- Successor: Nokia 6600
- Compatible networks: GSM 900/1800/1900; GPRS
- Form factor: Bar
- Dimensions: 129 mm (5.1 in) H 47 in (1,200 mm) W 21 mm (0.83 in) D
- Weight: 111 g (3.9 oz)
- Operating system: Series 30
- CPU: 50 MHz UPP8M, ARM7
- SIM: miniSIM
- Battery: Nokia BPS-2, 1100 mAh, 3.6 V user replaceable LiPo
- Charging: Nokia 3.5-mm DC Charging Interface
- Display: 1.7 in (43 mm) diagonal STN LCD; 96 × 65 px
- Sound: Mono speaker, line-out (proprietary)
- Connectivity: Bluetooth 1.1 with HFP, HSP, OPP and DUN; IrDA; RS-232
- Data inputs: Keypad; Push buttons
- Made in: Germany

The Nokia 6310 is a mobile phone developed by Nokia, announced on March 21, 2001 and first released in November 2001 as the successor of the Nokia 6210. An upgraded tri-band version, Nokia 6310i, was also released in 2002. Primarily marketed as a business phone, it was for some years the dominant GSM device in the corporate world. It was Nokia's joint-first (with Nokia 8310) handset with GPRS cell data connectivity and was also their first with integrated Bluetooth short-range connectivity. Known for being robust and reliable, the Nokia 6310 and 6310i are considered two of the greatest handsets Nokia has produced.

== Features ==
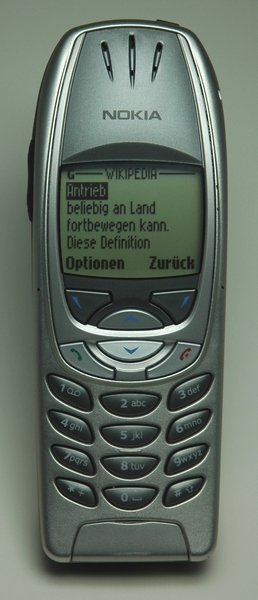
WAP web browser displaying a Wikipedia page in German

The Nokia 6310 was the first business class Nokia phone built on their DCT4 hardware platform. The Nokia 6310 is GPRS and HSCSD enabled for wireless cellular communication. The handset has support for e-mail messages and text messages including pictures, and also has a WAP 1.2.1 browser. In wireless communications it also has integrated Bluetooth v1.1 and IrDA. The updated Nokia 6310i model has support for Java applications including the Java APIs: CLDC 1.0, MIDP 1.0 and Nokia UI API.

Despite the lack of polyphonic ringtones, it was the first Nokia phone (along with Nokia 8310) to feature a startup tone in ADPCM format. Polyphonic ringtones were skipped due to the relatively low speaker volume during playback of ADPCM files.

At CeBIT 2002, Nokia introduced the Nokia 6310i. It is mostly identical to the 6310 but has tri-band (GSM 900/1800/1900) reception instead of dual-band, Java and a blue-backlit LCD screen (as opposed to the earlier green backlighting). It was most commonly offered in Two-tone Silver/Grey or Two-tone Gold/Black trim; the third option, a Copper coloured variant, was much rarer.

== American variants ==
A number of variants of the Nokia 6310 were released for the Americas. The Nokia 6340 was announced on January 7, 2002, and is a tri-mode/dual-band TDMA (800/1900), GSM (1900) and analog AMPS (800) cell phone. It was also the first GAIT compliant handset designed for roaming. The Nokia 6340i was a later updated version of this that added GSM 850.

Nokia 6360 is another variant compatible with TDMA and AMPS only. Nokia 6370 is a CDMA cell phone and Nokia's first to make use of CDMA2000 1x data networks, released June 2002. Nokia 6385 has both CDMA and AMPS.

== Mercedes-Benz ==
Like the 6210, the 6310 and 6310i were optionally included on several Mercedes-Benz cars. This phone was used on the Mercedes-Benz S-Class (W220) (1998—2006 type), where it was held in a cradle and connected to the car's integrated car phone and media system called COMAND APS.

A cradle was installed in the dashboard, into which the phone was securely placed. Connectors in the cradle provided the phone with electrical power, routed the audio path through the car's audio system, and an external antenna mounted on the car's chassis replaced the internal antenna, providing a stronger signal and better signal-to-noise ratio.

In 2003, Nokia also began integrating the 6310i in some Lexus cars.

== Reception ==
The 6310 competed against other multi-band and GPRS-capable business phones such as Motorola Timeport 280.

The Nokia 6310/6310i was very popular for its robustness, simplicity and long battery life years after being discontinued as a product. Many reviews mention the 6310i as one of the best handsets Nokia ever produced.

== Nokia 6310 (2021) ==
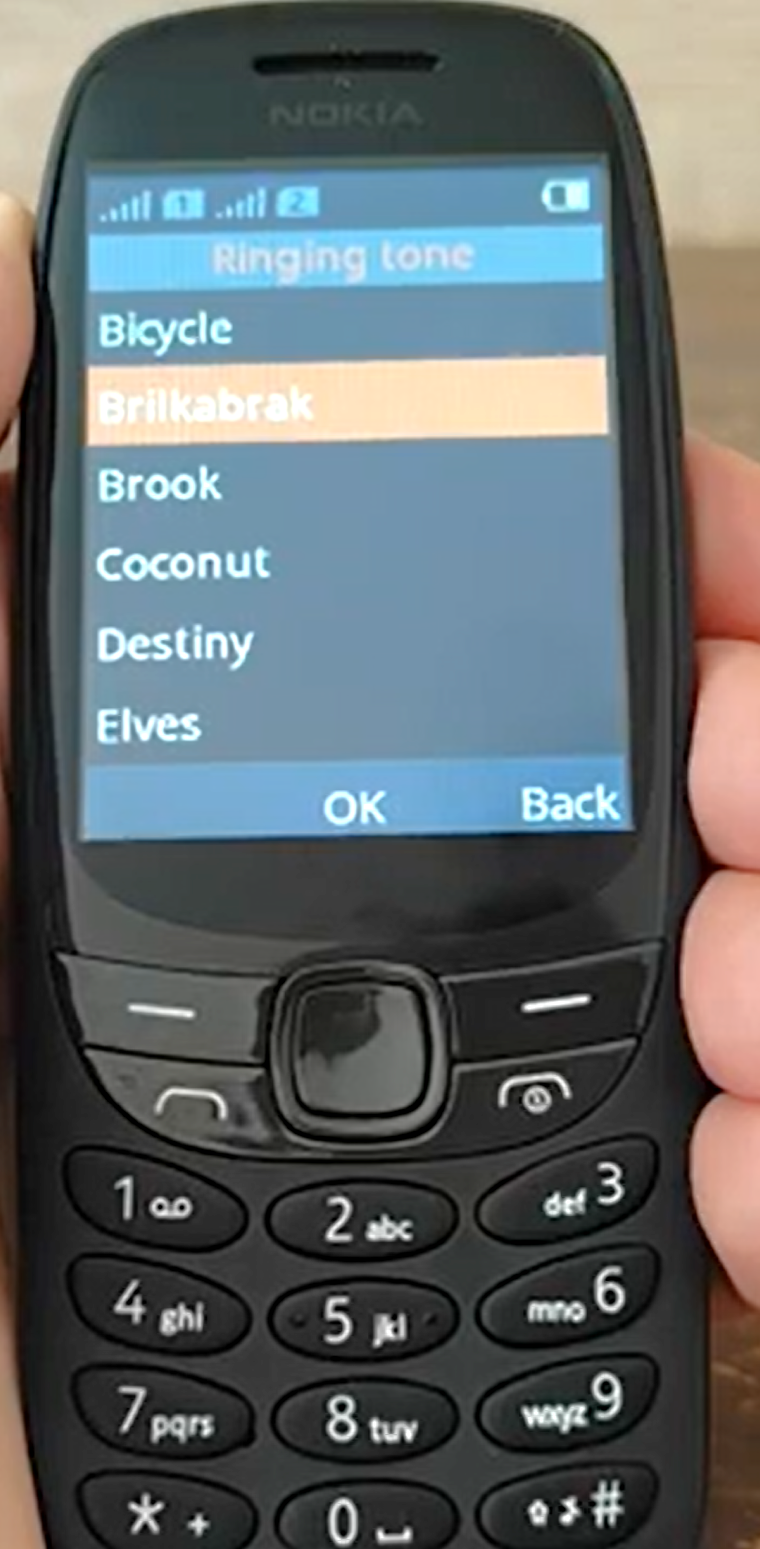
Nokia 6310 (2021)

An updated variant of the 6310 was released in 2021 to celebrate the phone's 20th anniversary, featuring modern-day updates including a 2.8" color display, polyphonic ringtones, a VGA rear camera and a microSD slot.

In April 2024, a refresh of the model was launched, with the only new change being a USB-C port.
