= Nokia 3220 =

Cell phone model

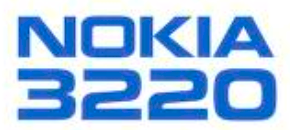

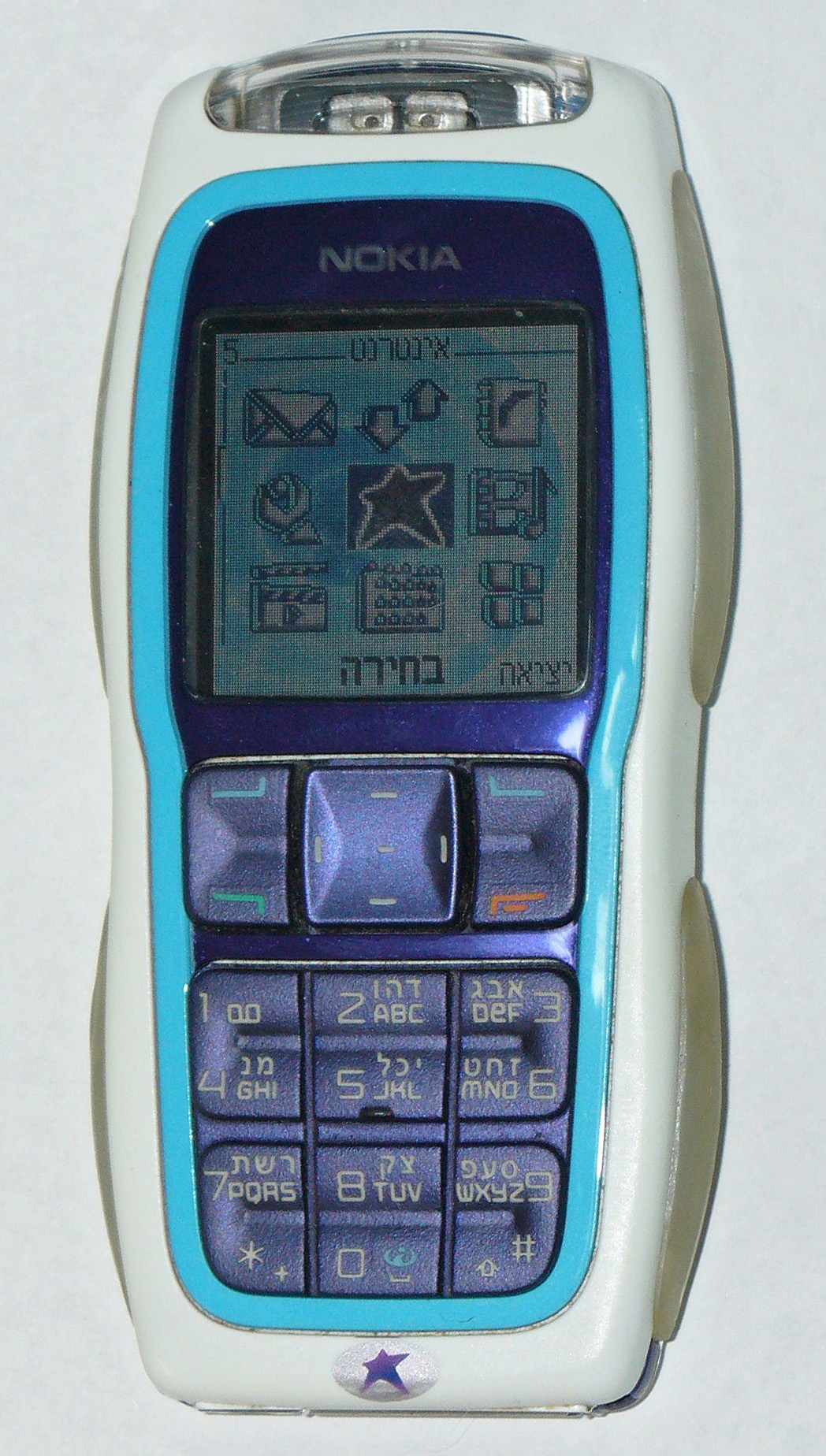
- Manufacturer: Nokia
- First released: June 2004
- Availability by region: July 2004
- Predecessor: Nokia 3200 (3220)
- Successor: Nokia 3230 (3220); Nokia 5200 (3220); Nokia 5300 (3220b)
- Related: Nokia 6020; Nokia 7260
- Compatible networks: (United States) GSM 850/1800/1900 or (European Union) GSM 900/1800/1900
- Form factor: Candybar
- Dimensions: 104×44×18.8 mm (4.09×1.73×0.74 in)
- Weight: 86 g (3 oz)
- Operating system: Series 40
- Memory: 4.5 MB (2.5 MB User & 1MB Java)
- Battery: BL-5B 760 mAh
- Rear camera: 640 x 480 VGA (0.3 mpix) with video recording capability
- Display: 128 x 128 65,536 color TFT LCD

The Nokia 3220 is a GSM, Series 40 mobile phone from Nokia. The Nokia 3220 was introduced on 31 May 2004 as a "fun" device with LED lights and Xpress-on covers. It was the first entry-level phone that offered full access to the Internet, with an XHTML browser and POP3/IMAP email client. The tri-band camera phone uses GPRS and EDGE for its internet connections.

The phone can be seen as an upgrade of the Nokia 3200. Like the 3200, custom rear face plates can be created by the user. A stencil is available in the pack. While features such as infrared and a built-in FM radio are removed, new features such as rhythmic LED flashing lights (two on each side), wave messaging, voice dialing, themes, and a video recorder are added. With the addition of an optional face plate, when the phone is waved back and forth rapidly, a light message of text is produced in mid-air. An FM radio can be added on with the use of the phone's Pop-Port. The 3220 features a 16-bit (65,536) color screen, which is an improvement over the 3200's 12-bit (4096) color screen. The phone also has more internal memory than the 3200. The CIF camera is also upgraded to 0.3 megapixels VGA (640x480 resolution, for photos), and features video recording (128x96) capability. At just 86 grams, the Nokia 3220 is also very lightweight. The phone can be connected to a computer via a Nokia CA-42 Pop-Port cable.

The Nokia 6020 and 7260 had similar hardware specifications to the 3220, with different software and ringtones installed. The 3220 was mainly marketed towards the youth market, the 6020 mainly towards business users, and the 7260 towards fashion-oriented individuals.

The phone has a built-in browser which seems to be very slow (in terms of data processing) to many. It can download files of any format but cannot open SIS, SVG, WAV, MP3, MP4 etc. files. It downloads many files which are Copyright Protected. These files cannot be sent via MMS. This phone supports MMS under 100 kilobytes. The Java games or applications must be under 120 kb otherwise the phone cannot run them. It has a memory shortage and often causes Java applications to stop due to the lack of RAM.

In November 2004, Nokia introduced a Near Field Communication (NFC) shell for the 3220, making the 3220 Nokia's first ever model with NFC technology, provided the add-on is included.

Supported formats: Image: JPG, JPEG, BMP, WBMP, PNG, GIF. Sound: MID, AMR, MP3 (only firmware v5.10 or higher). Java: JAR, JAD. Theme: NTH

== Versions ==
- Nokia 3220 for Europe/Asia/Africa - GSM 900/1800/1900 with GPRS and EDGE technology.
- Nokia 3220b for North America - GSM 850/1800/1900 with GPRS and EDGE technology.
