= Nokia 3110 classic =

2007 cell phone model manufactured by Nokia

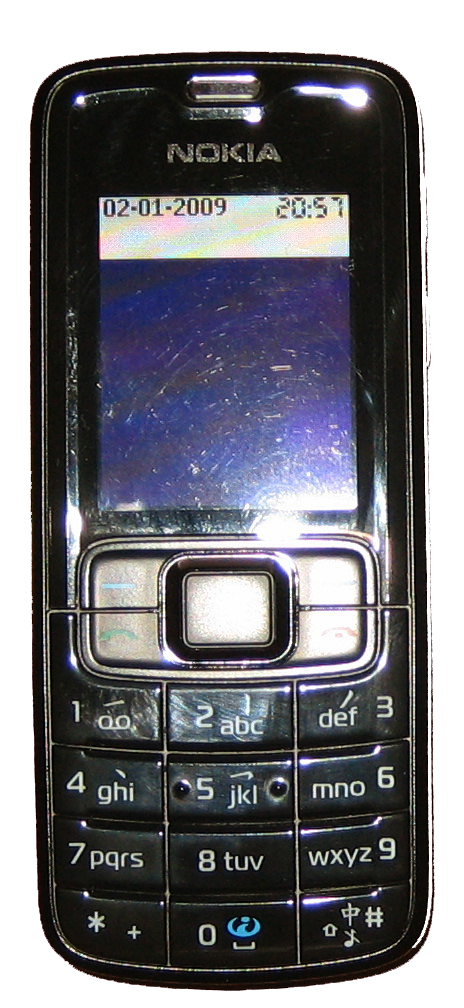
- Manufacturer: Nokia
- Availability by region: 12 February 2007
- Predecessor: Nokia 3100; Nokia 5070/6070/6080
- Successor: Nokia 3120 classic Nokia 3720 classic Nokia 5130; Nokia C3-00; Nokia 3310 (2017)
- Related: Nokia 2630; Nokia 3500 classic
- Compatible networks: GPRS, EDGE, EGPRS, HSCSD, CSD, GSM 900, GSM 1800, GSM 1900
- Form factor: Candybar
- Dimensions: 108.5×45.7×15.6 mm (4.27×1.80×0.61 in)
- Weight: 87 g (3 oz)
- Operating system: Nokia OS Series 40 3rd Edition, Feature Pack 2
- Memory: 2 Mb (available for JVM)
- Storage: 9 MB (internal)
- Removable storage: microSD
- Battery: BL-5C; 970 mAh; 3.7 V Li-Ion
- Rear camera: 1.3 Megapixels (Back)
- Display: 128 × 160 pixels
- Connectivity: Bluetooth 2.0 + EDR, Bluetooth Stereo Audio, Infrared, Mini USB, Nokia Audio Visual Plug 2.5 mm
- Data inputs: Keypad

The Nokia 3110 classic is a mobile phone handset, manufactured by Nokia in Hungary and released for sale in 2007. It is a budget model with similar features to the Nokia 6300. Although the phone bears the same model number as the 1997 Nokia 3110, it was not directly derived from (and has little similarity with) this model.

The Nokia 3110 classic is a "candybar" cameraphone which uses the Series 40 operating system and operates on GSM networks operating at 900 MHz, 1800 MHz, or 1900 MHz, supporting EDGE (Enhanced Data Rates for GSM Evolution) connections. In some regions the phone was marketed as the Nokia 3110c, which is the same as the 3110 classic.

The phone also supports Bluetooth, FM radio, and music playback, and supports microSD cards up to 2 GB. The microSD card slot is under the battery cover, which means it's not hot swappable. The phone can be connected to a computer via USB, allowing data transfer and PC synchronization.

The phone has large buttons in its keypad which make typing messages and e-mails easy. The 1.8-inch display supports a maximum display resolution of 128 × 160.

== Variants ==
=== Nokia 3109 classic ===
The Nokia 3109 classic was released around the same time as the 3110 classic. It is essentially the same model, but without a camera and FM radio functionality, and comes in less colors

=== Nokia 3110 Evolve ===
The Nokia 3110 Evolve is an environmentally friendly variant of the 3110 classic, sharing the same features like a 1.3 megapixel camera, but with a different design.

Its covers are built from bio-materials, and its packaging is made from 60% recycled materials. The included charger is also more energy efficient.

== Technical specifications ==
Feature	Specification
Frequency	GSM Triband EGSM 900 MHz, GSM 1800/1900 MHz
Display	262,144 colors Active TFT, 128x160 pixels display, 1.8-inch display (~114 ppi pixel density)
User interface	Series 40 user interface v07.21
Imaging	Integrated 1.3-megapixel (1280 x 1024 pixels) camera with up to 8x digital zoom, video recorder (3gp up to 176x144 pixels)
Multimedia	Stereo FM radio, Visual Radio, Integrated music player for MP3, AAC, AAC+, eAAC+, WMA 9 & 10, H.263, H.264 formats, Audio recorder which records in AMR format
Call log	yes.
Memory Functions	8.5 MB built-in memory. Options to expand up to 2 GB with microSD card
Messaging	SMS, MMS, Multimedia plus, Email, Audio messaging, Flash Messaging, Instant Messaging
Java Applications	Java MIDP 2.0
Ringing Tones	64-chord/voice polyphonic MIDI ringing tones, supporting MP3, True Tones, 64-chord/voice polyphonic MIDI ringing tones
Connectivity	Bluetooth 2.0, Infrared, miniUSB v2.0
Browsing	OMA Digital DRM 2.0, Full OMA Client provisioning, DARP, EDGE (Class B, multislot class 10) up to 236.8 kbit/s, GPRS Class 10 (4+1/3+2 slots), 32 - 48 kbit/s, GPRS/EDGE/HSCSD/CSD for browsing and as data modem
Push to talk over Cellular (PoC)	Push to talk over cellular network via dedicated key
Digital Services	Video streaming services
Voice Features	Voice dialing, Voice commands, Integrated handsfree speaker, Speaker Independent Number Dialing
Battery	Standard battery, Li-Ion 1020mAh (BL-5C), Stand-by Up to 370 h, Talk time Up to 4 h
Synchronisation	yes, Contacts, notes and calendar can be done via bluetooth, infrared, data cable.
SAR value	SAR US 0.96 W/kg (head), 0.33 W/kg (body), SAR EU 1.10 W/kg (head)
