= Nokia 110 (2022) =

2022 Nokia feature phone

- Brand: Nokia
- Manufacturer: HMD Global
- Type: Feature phone
- Series: Nokia 100 series
- First released: August 2022
- Availability by region: August 2022
- Predecessor: Nokia 110 (2019)
- Successor: Nokia 110 (2023)
- Compatible networks: GSM 900 / 1800
- Form factor: Bar
- Colors: Charcoal, Ocean Blue, Rose Gold
- Dimensions: 115.2 mm × 49.9 mm × 14.3 mm (4.54 in × 1.96 in × 0.56 in)
- Weight: 71.7 g (2.53 oz)
- Memory: 4 MB
- Storage: 4 MB
- Removable storage: microSDHC (dedicated slot)
- Battery: Li-Ion 1000 mAh, removable
- Rear camera: QVGA
- Display: 1.77 inches, TFT LCD, 65K colors Resolution: 120 x 160 pixels, 4:3 ratio (~113 ppi density)
- Sound: Loudspeaker, 3.5mm jack
- Connectivity: Micro-USB 2.0
- Other: FM radio (built-in antenna), MP3 player, Flashlight

The Nokia 110 (2022) is a feature phone branded by Nokia and manufactured by HMD Global. It was released on August 4, 2022 in India along with the Nokia 8210 4G. It was succeeded by the 2023 model year and was available at Charcoal, Ocean Blue and Rose Gold color options.

== Features ==
- TFT display; 65K colors (1.77 inches; 120 × 160 px)
- QVGA camera
- 32-gigabyte expandable storage via microSD card
- Pre-installed games (e.g. Snake)
