= Field test mode =

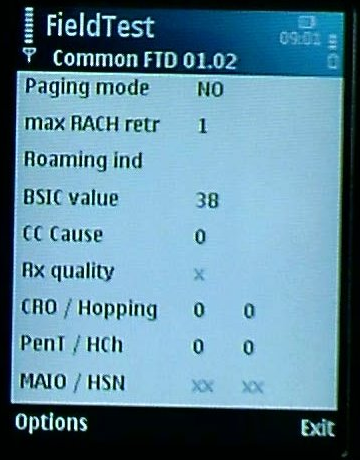
A Nokia phone in Field test mode.

Field test mode (FTM) or field test display (FTD) is a software application often pre-installed on mobile phones that provides the user with technical details, statistics relating to the mobile phone network and allows the user to run hardware tests on the phone.

== Nokia network monitor ==
Nokia network monitor (Netmonitor) or Monitor Mode was a hidden mode on most Nokia cell phones used to measure network parameters. Additionally there are measurements for phone and battery temperature and other phone specific measurements and tests. The mode can only be activated over a special FBus, or MBUS cable; or in some cases over infrared. Free software exists on the internet that allows one to activate this mode. The first step is to select a Nokia Phone like Nokia 3310 that has network monitor then activate the monitor. To activate, download software such as Gnokii, gammu, logomanager, or N-Monitor by Anderas Schmidt and connect the mobile with a FBus cable. In Nokia phones you just activate the monitor and not upload it to the phone, as it is already present.

Some of Nokia Series 60 phones have a Field test application installed or it could be installed with privileged permissions or on rooted phone.

Such mode and programs are available on Android and iPhone devices.

== Options ==
For GSM phones it may provide such details as

- TDMA timing advance
- Cell ID
- Transmit power and received signal strength indication (RSSI)
- Neighbouring cell info and PLMN codes
- Location area code
- TMSI number
- Timeslot / paging information
