= Nokia 8310 =

Cell phone model

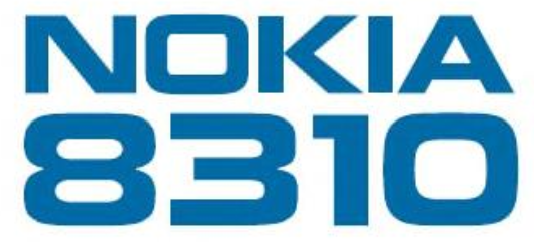

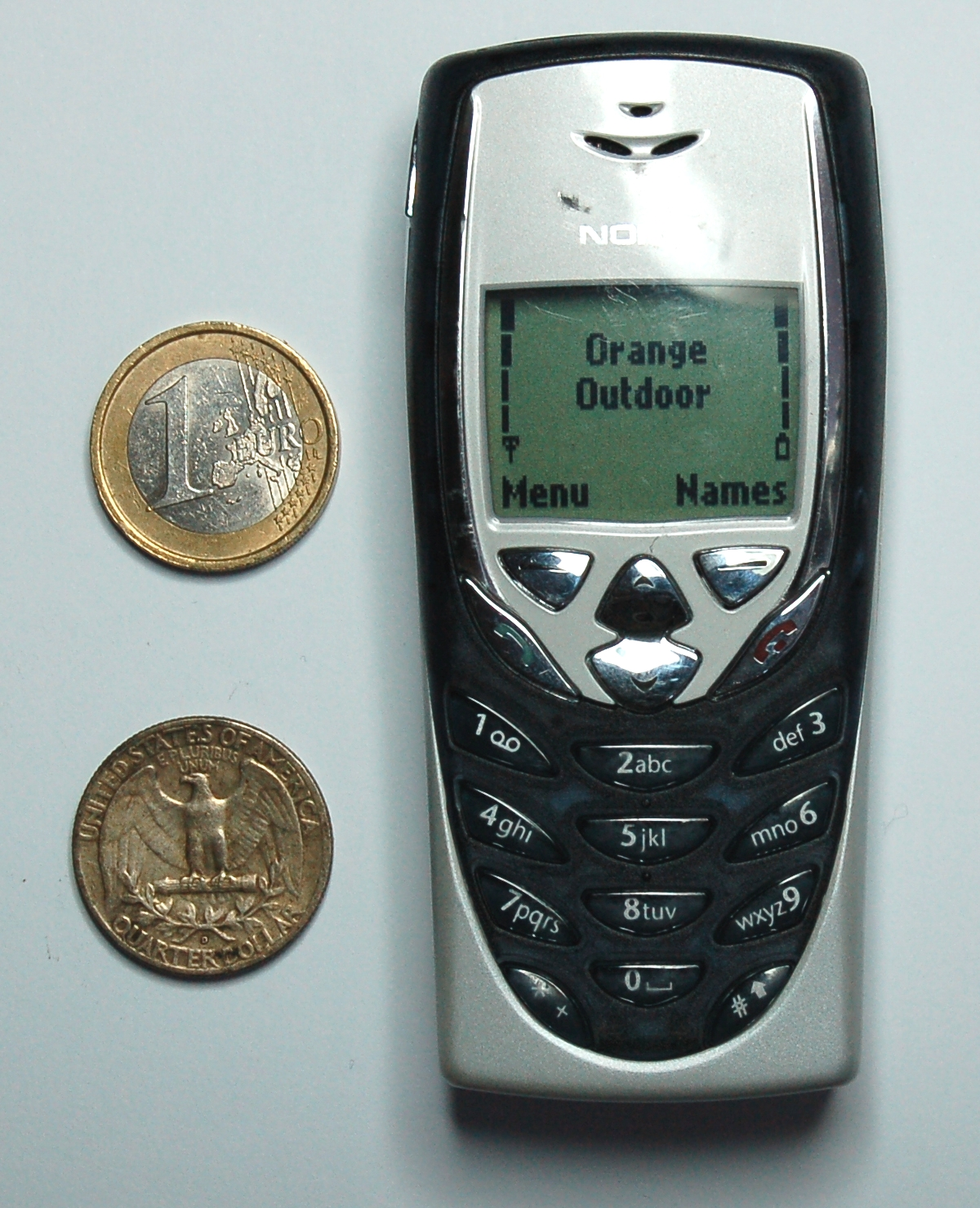
- Manufacturer: Nokia
- Availability by region: September 2001
- Discontinued: 2004
- Predecessor: Nokia 8210
- Successor: Nokia 6610; Nokia 7210
- Related: Nokia 6510; Nokia 6310; Nokia 6500
- Compatible networks: GSM 900/1800 (8310); GSM 1900 (8390)
- Dimensions: 97×43×20 mm (3.82×1.69×0.79 in), 67 cc
- Weight: 84 g (3 oz)
- Operating system: Series 30
- Battery: Standard, 750 mAh Li-Ion (BLB-2)
- Display: Monochrome graphic, 84 x 48 pixels
- Connectivity: GPRS, Infrared port

The Nokia 8310 is a mobile phone manufactured by Nokia between 2001 and 2004. The handset was announced at CEBIT on March 21, 2001 as a member of Nokia's flagship premium 'candybar' variety and retailed for a price in excess of £400 (approximately £740 in 2025 adjusted for inflation) when it first shipped in September 2001. As the successor to the Nokia 8210, the 8310 was even smaller in size, one of the smallest Nokia has produced to date. It also has support for Xpress-On covers, and it was reported to come in 100 colour combinations.

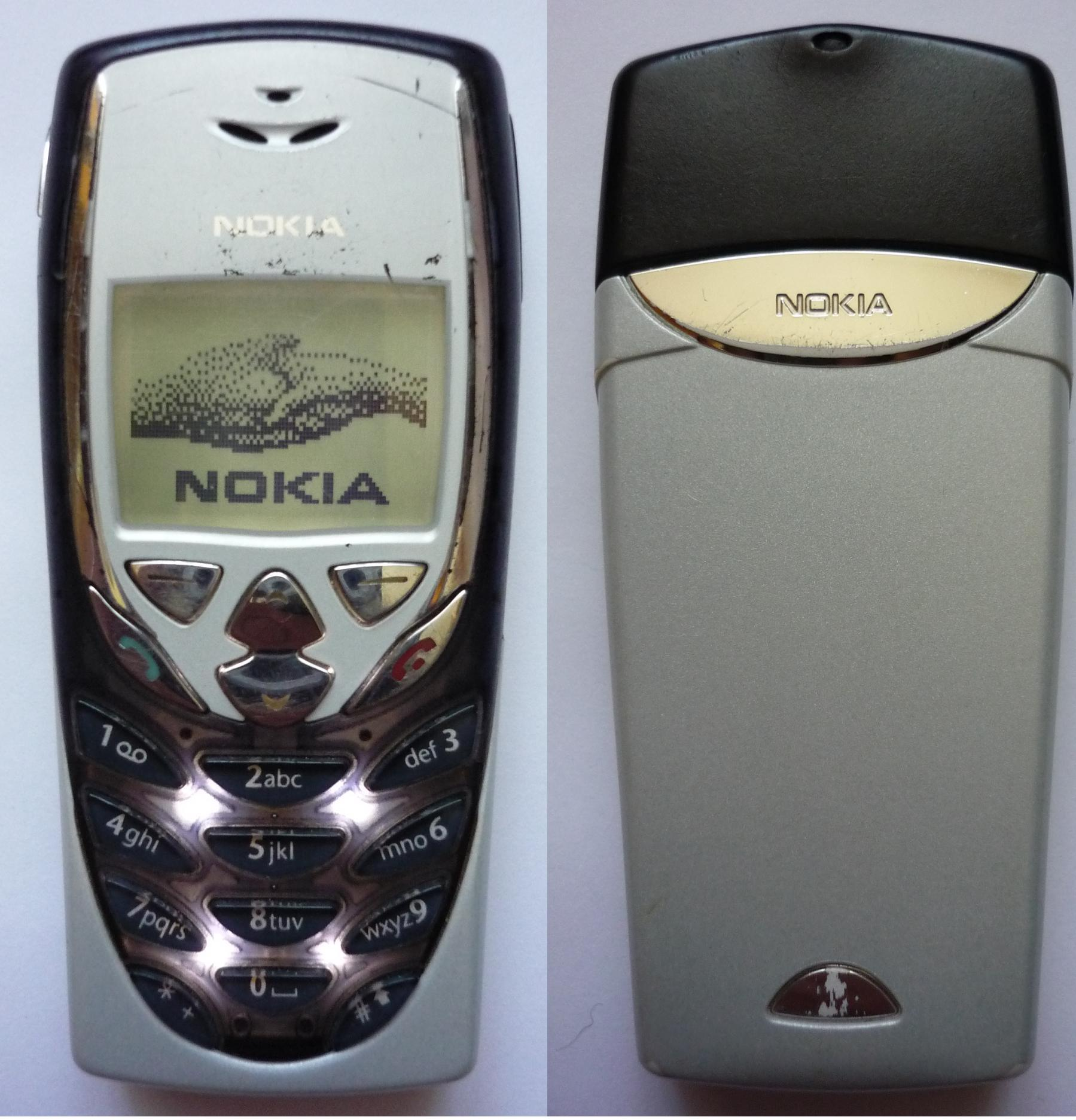
Front and rear of an 8310

It, along with the Nokia 6310, was the first Nokia phone built on the Nokia DCT4 hardware platform, which replaced the DCT3 that dated back to the Nokia 6110 (1997). It contained advanced features not normally found on handsets of the time, such as infrared, a fully functional calendar, and was the first Nokia phone to support GPRS data and an FM radio. It was also the first Nokia phone to feature a polyphonic startup sound, despite not having polyphonic ringtones built into the phone, possibly due to the muffled sound. The 8310 has a white backlight.

The 8310 shares the same platform and shape with the 2002-released Nokia 6510, which the latter model being a more business-oriented phone and utilised a higher resolution 96x60 display. Faceplates designed for the 8310 can be installed on a 6510 and vice versa. They were among Nokia's last phones to feature a monochrome display with a buzzer. Nokia 8310 was succeeded by the Nokia 7210 with the fashion-oriented handsets moving from the 8xxx range to 7xxx. However, it is considered that it did not receive a true successor incorporating its especially small size.

== Variants ==
A GSM-1900 version for the North American market named the Nokia 8390 was also released. AT&T Wireless and Rogers Communications offered the 8390 in the United States and Canada, respectively.
