= Nokia 3100 =

2003 cell phone model manufactured by Nokia

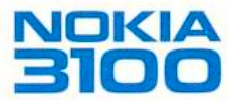

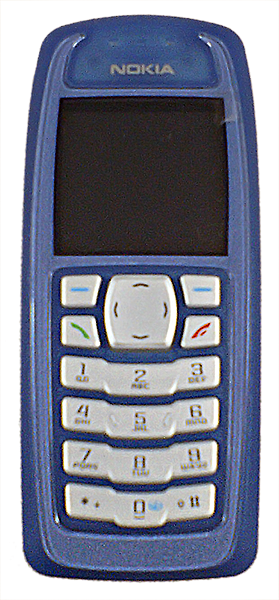
- Manufacturer: Nokia
- Predecessor: Nokia 3510 (3100/3100b); Nokia 3530 (3105)
- Successor: Nokia 3108 (3105); Nokia 3200 (3100); Nokia 3205 (3105)
- Compatible networks: GSM 900/1800/1900 (3100/3120); GSM 850/1800/1900 (3100b/3120b); CDMA 800 (3105/3125)
- Form factor: Candybar
- Dimensions: 102 mm × 43 mm × 15.2 mm (4.02 in × 1.69 in × 0.60 in)
- Weight: 99 g (3.5 oz)
- Operating system: Series 40 1st Edition
- Memory: 439 KB
- Battery: BL-5C, 850 mAh
- Rear camera: 640×480 VGA (sold separately, added via Pop-Port)
- Display: 128×128 4096 color CSTN
- Connectivity: Pop-Port only

The Nokia 3100 is a triband-GSM mobile phone announced on 17 June 2003 as an entry-level phone from Nokia and released in September 2003, designed primarily for the youth market.

The Nokia 3100 was developed from the Nokia 6100 as a successor to the Nokia 3510. The phone was Nokia's first in the youth-oriented 3000-series to be equipped with a 128×128 pixel passive colour display (4096 colors/12-bit), and included Java MIDP 1.0, XHTML and WAP browser, GPRS, Pop-Port connectivity and Lithium-ion battery. It is also capable of playing polyphonic MIDI files, which can be used as ringtones.

It is compact in size and lightweight, and also features special lighting effects.

== Features ==
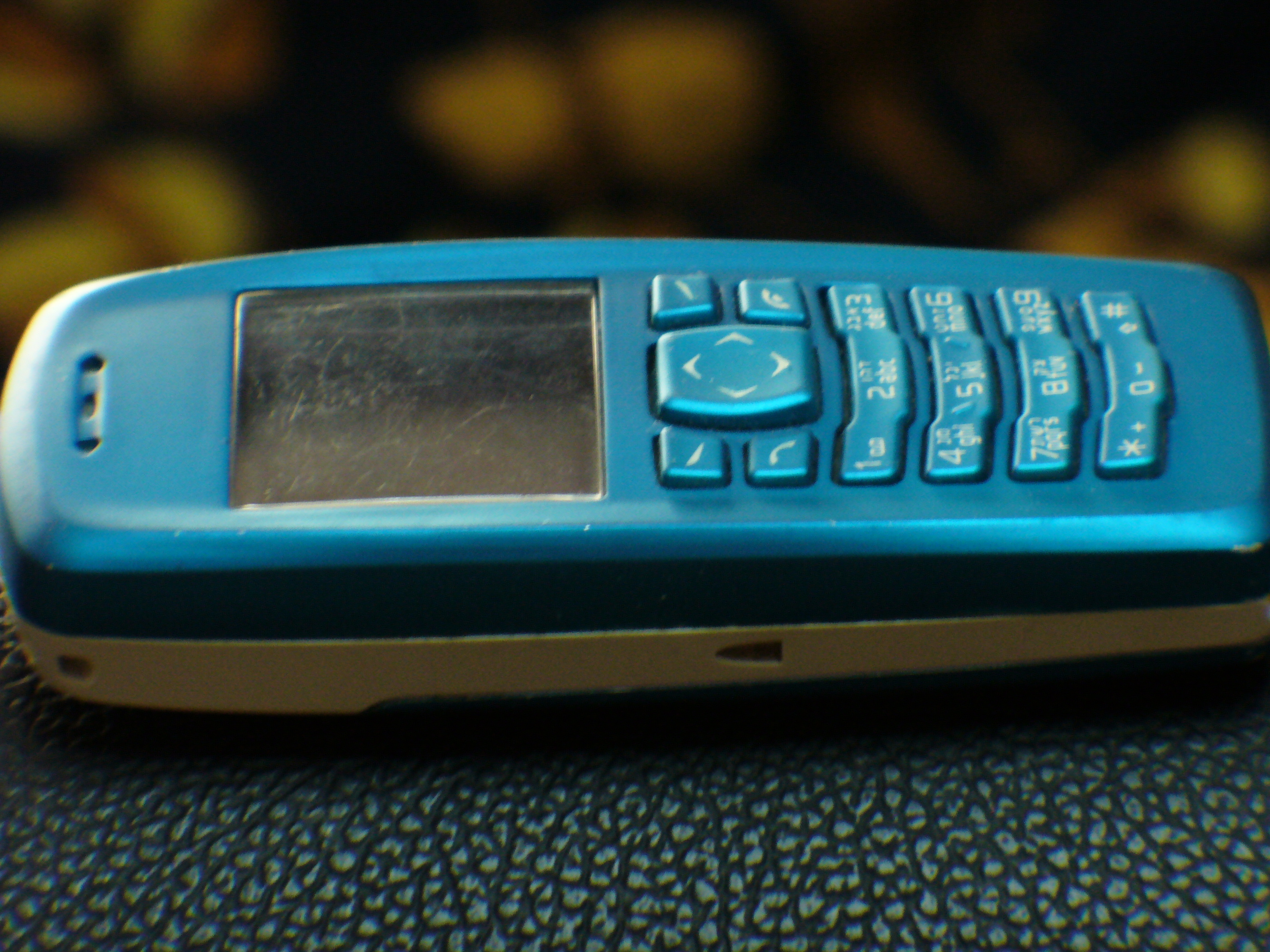
Side view

The Nokia 3100 uses Nokia's Series 40 platform firmware that has large static icons rather than the animated icons of some other Nokia phones.

The phone can send and receive text and multimedia messages with ringtones and images in BMP, JPEG, PNG and GIF formats. The basic 3100 does not have a voice recorder, radio receiver, MP3 player, or camera, while the 3100b variant has voice recording. A camera can be added to the phone via its Pop-Port.

The Nokia 3200 builds on the Nokia 3100, adding things like a built-in CIF-resolution camera from the Nokia 7250i. Despite the 3200 being designated as the successor to the 3100, the 3200 was less popular than the 3100; this kept the 3100 (and its redesign, the 3120) in production while the 3200 was discontinued and replaced by the Nokia 3220.

The Nokia 3200 has the dimensions of 104.5 x 44.2 x 18.7 mm (4.11 x 1.74 x 0.74 in), and the weight of around 86 g (3.03 oz)

== Variants ==
=== Nokia 3100 (RH-19) ===
The basic version, intended to be used in European GSM networks. It works in GSM 900/1800/1900.

=== Nokia 3100b (RH-50) ===
This version intended to be used in American GSM networks. It works in GSM 850/1800/1900.

Differences from the basic 3100:

- The Grid (originally the Line), an additional main menu interface in the settings menu
- TTY/TTD option in Menu → Settings → Enhancement settings that appears only if the phone has been connected to a headset, TTD, or similar device
- Voice recording during an active call, up to 1 minute
- World clock that displays the time for various time zones

=== Nokia 3105 ===
The CDMA version of the Nokia 3100, working in CDMA2000 1xRTT networks. It is physically similar to the 3100 except for a built-in flashlight and a slightly different shape of the rear battery cover; the phone's firmware has more functions than the basic 3100 or 3100b, such as voice tags and voice commands, and the Organizer menu.

The Nokia 3105 was used in Australia on the Hutchison Orange network until the closure of the CDMA network in Australia in late 2006. All customers on the Orange network were then moved to Hutchison's 3G network "3".

=== Nokia 3120 ===
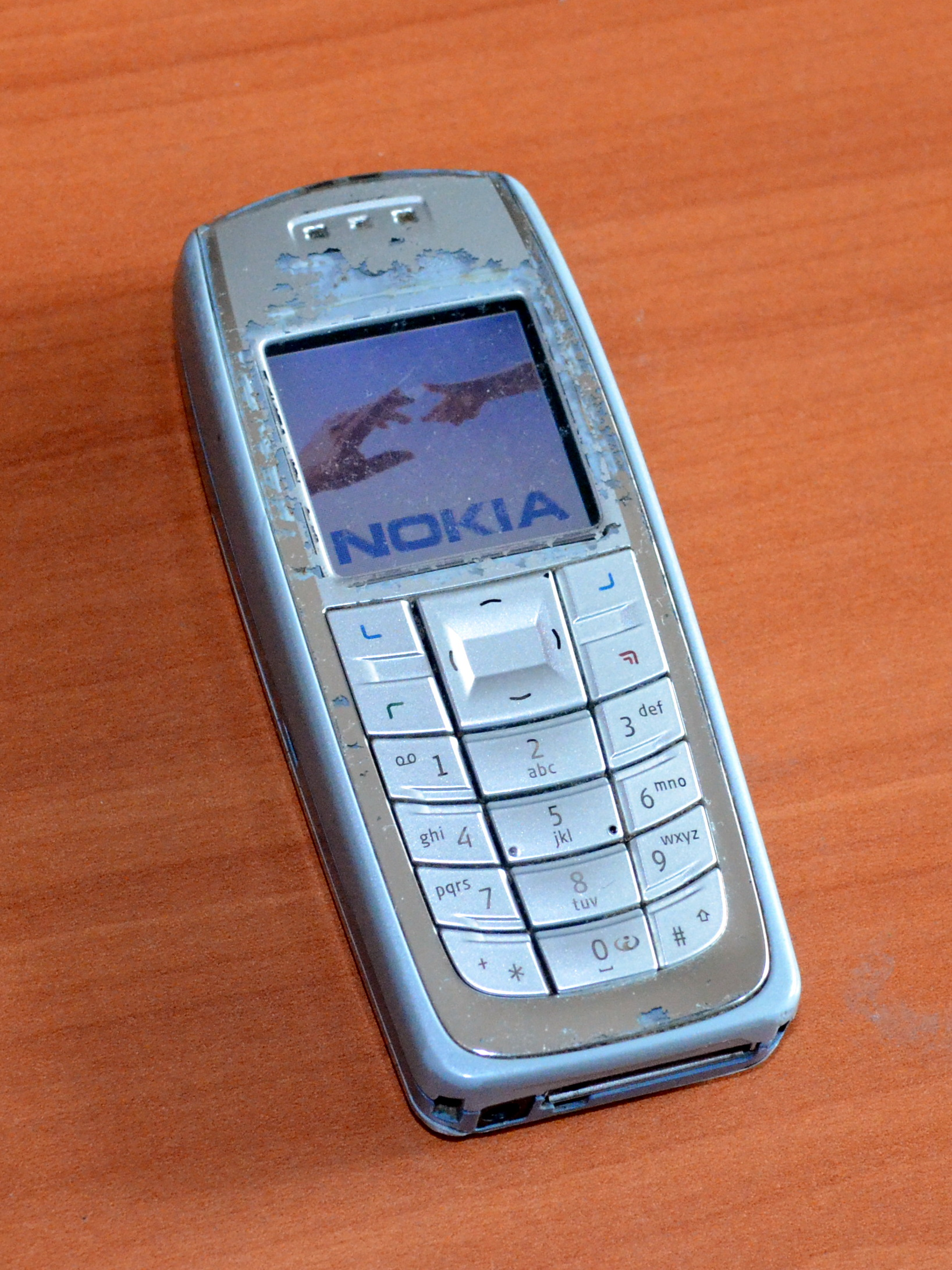
Nokia 3120

Announced in 2004, the Nokia 3120 is a redesigned variant of the 3100. Apart from a more "business-like" face plate, a revised keypad and the inclusion of SmileyWorld-themed content, the 3120 is otherwise identical to the base 3100 variants. In addition to the GSM 3120, the CDMA 3105 was also revised as the Nokia 3125, using the base 3120 faceplate while retaining the 3105 battery cover.

=== Nokia 3120b ===
This version intended to be used in American GSM networks. It works in GSM 850/1800/1900.

=== Nokia 3125 ===
The CDMA version of the Nokia 3120, working in CDMA2000 1xRTT networks. It is physically similar to the 3120 except for a built-in flashlight and a slightly different shape of the rear battery cover; the phone's firmware has more functions than the basic 3120 or 3120b, such as voice tags and voice commands, and the Organizer menu.

Differences from the basic 3120:

- The Grid (originally the Line), an additional main menu interface in the settings menu
- TTY/TTD option in Menu → Settings → Enhancement settings that appears only if the phone has been connected to a headset, TTD, or similar device
- Voice recording during an active call, up to 1 minute
- World clock that displays the time for various time zones
