= Nokia 3110 =

1997 cell phone model manufactured by Nokia

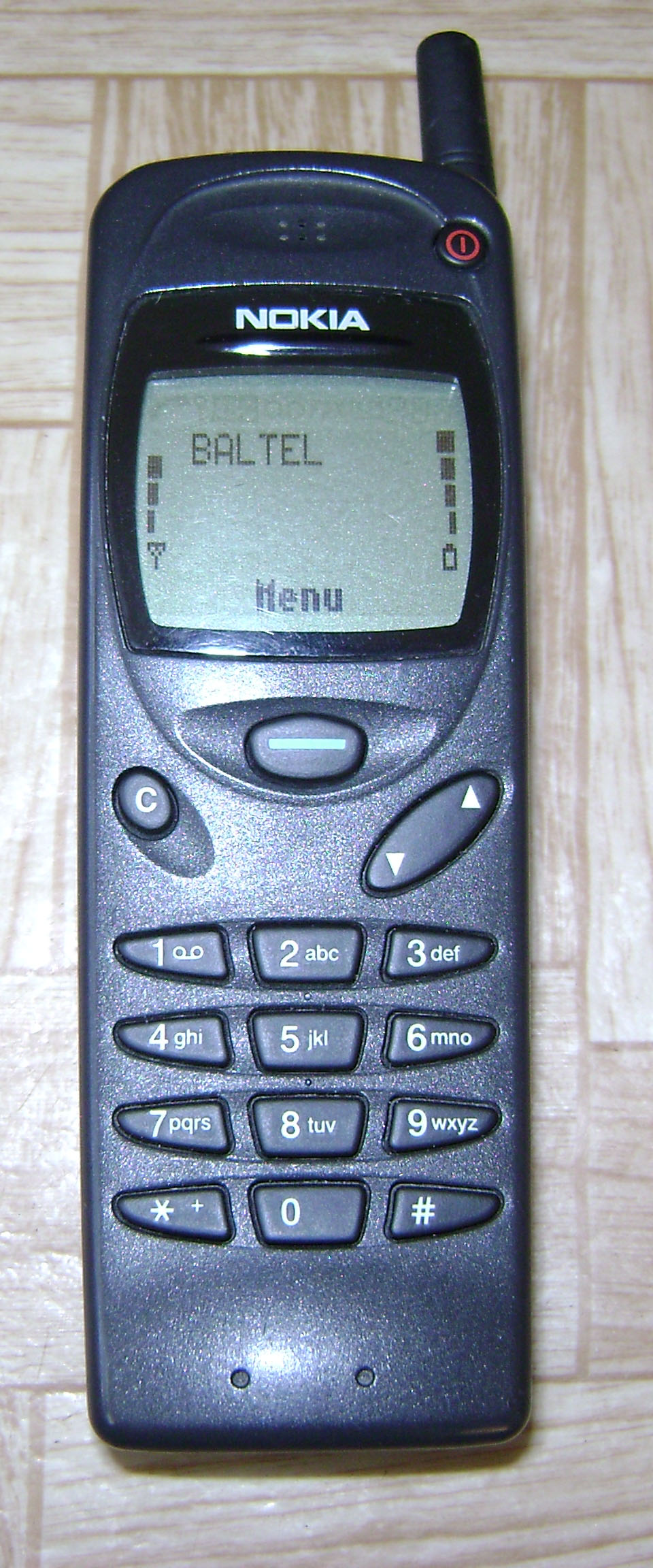
- Manufacturer: Nokia
- Availability by region: July 1997
- Predecessor: Nokia 1610
- Successor: Nokia 5110; Nokia 3210
- Related: Nokia 8110
- Compatible networks: 2G (GSM): 900
- Form factor: Candybar
- Dimensions: 136×45×21 mm (5.35×1.77×0.83 in), 139 cc
- Weight: 146 g (slim battery); 187 g (standard battery)
- Operating system: default
- Memory: SIM card
- Battery: Slim Battery, 400 mAh, Li-Ion; Standard Battery, 550 mAh, NiMH
- Display: Monochrome

The 3110 is a GSM mobile phone handset manufactured by Nokia in Hungary, introduced at CEBIT in March 12, 1997. The 3110 is notable as the first Nokia handset to feature the 'Navi-Key' (a.k.a. D-Pad) menu navigation system. The Navi-Key was featured heavily on Nokia handsets, especially the entry-level models such as the Nokia 1100 in the following years. Unlike its successor, the 3210, and subsequent handsets of similar design, the 3110 had an external antenna. The phone was available with a slim, standard or vibrating battery. It could only be used on a GSM-900 network.

The 3110 shared the platform and accessories of the Nokia 8110 "banana phone".

The model number was reused by Nokia in 2007 when the company launched the Nokia 3110 classic. The 3110 classic sports a candybar form factor similar to that of the 3110, but adds modern features such as Bluetooth, camera functionality, audio and video playback and recording, and packet data over EDGE, in addition to tri-band functionality.

Unlike subsequent 3000 series mobile phones, its display is not PCD8544 based.

== Features and specification ==
The 3110 was clearly aimed at business users, with notable features including PC synchronisation, good battery life and conservative black styling.

- Network: GSM 900
- Dimensions: 136 x 45 x 21 mm, 139 cc
- Weight: 187 g
- Screen: Monochromatic with green backlight
- Contacts: 250
- SMS
- Standby Time: 40–95 hours
- Talktime: 90–165 minutes

== See also ==
- Nokia 3210
- Nokia 3310
- Nokia 3410
