= Nokia 3510 =

Mobile phone by Nokia

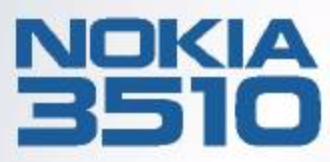

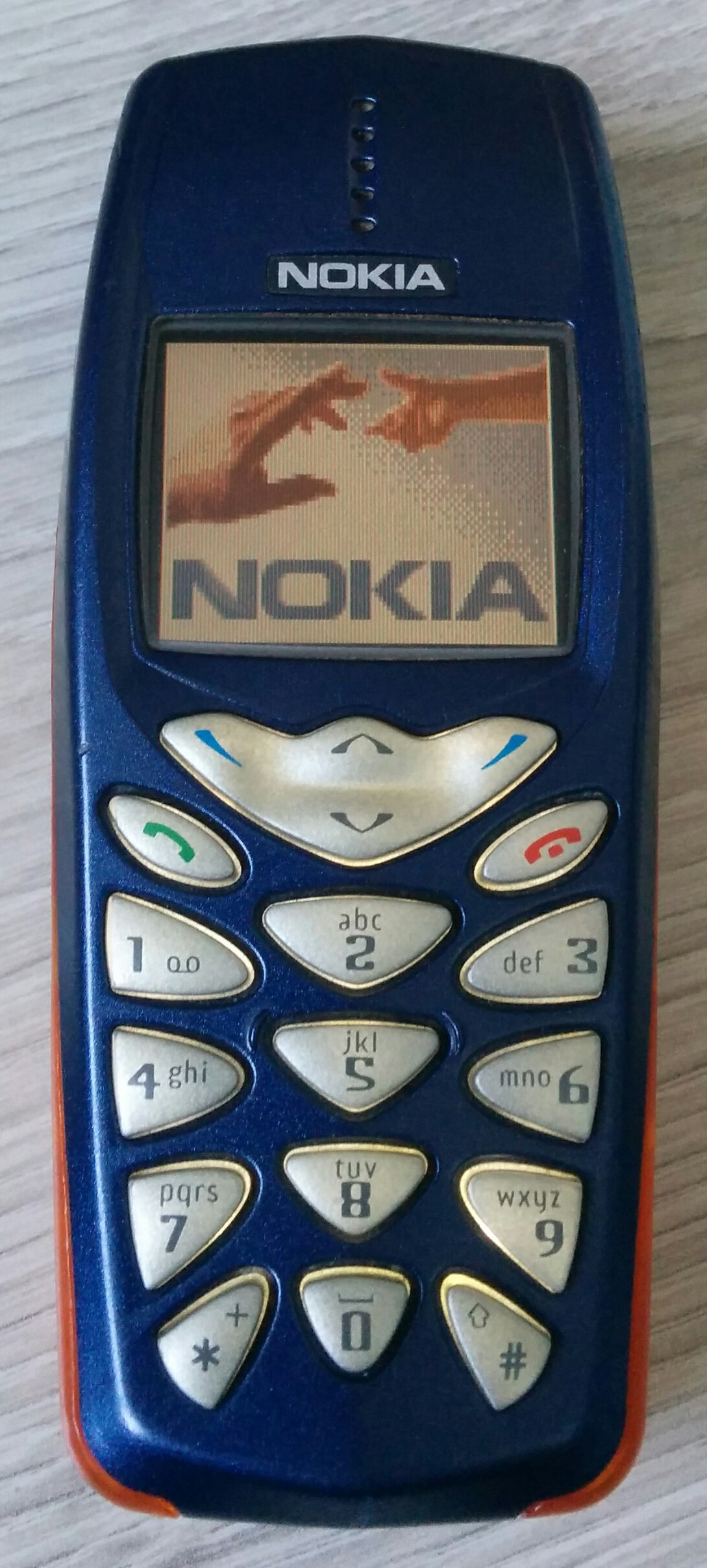
- Nokia 3510i (color screen variant)
- Manufacturer: Nokia
- First released: 3510/3510i (2002) 3560/3590/3595 (2003)
- Availability by region: 2002 (3510/3510i) 2003 (3590)
- Discontinued: Q4 2004/Q1 2005 (3510), c. late 2006/early 2007 (3510i)
- Predecessor: Nokia 3310 (3510); Nokia 3330 (3510i); Nokia 3350 (3530); Nokia 3360 (3560); Nokia 3390 (3590); Nokia 3395 (3595)
- Successor: Nokia 3100 (3510); Nokia 3105 (3530); Nokia 6010 (3590/3595); Nokia 6020 (3510i); Nokia 6560 (3560); Nokia 6585 (3580/3585)
- Related: Nokia 3410
- Compatible networks: European Union GSM-900/GSM-1800 (3510/3510i); USA GSM-850/GSM-1900 (3590/3595); USA TDMA-850/1900/AMPS-850 (3560)
- Dimensions: Length: 11.9 cm x Depth: 2.28 cm x Width: 5.00 cm
- Weight: 111 g (3.92 oz)
- Memory: 9MB
- Removable storage: No
- Battery: NiMH 950/1000mA·h BLC-2: Talk: 6.5 hours; Standby: 12.5 days (300 hours)
- Rear camera: No
- Display: Monochrome, 96 x 65 pixels (3510 in 2002/3590 in 2003) or 12-bit color CSTN, 96 x 65 pixels (3510i/3520/3530/3560/3595)
- Connectivity: GPRS

The Nokia 3510 is a mobile phone for the GSM network, introduced on March 12, 2002. It was the first Nokia phone to bring GPRS internet services to the mass market and their first phone to ship with Beatnik's miniBAE software-based sound engine, responsible for the playback of polyphonic ringtones and other system sounds.

The 3510 is the successor to the Nokia 3310 and is built on the upgraded Nokia DCT4 hardware platform and a Series 30 user interface. The phone also supports MMS messaging, likely the only produced monochrome display device with MMS capability. A colour display variant, 3510i, was released later in 2002. The Nokia 3510i model supports Java2ME that makes it possible for users to download and use Java applications, background images and polyphonic ringtones.

== Variants ==
An enhanced version, Nokia 3510i, was introduced some time later on 6 September 2002 and released in December 2002. It was one of the first phones with a color screen and it was one of the longest Nokia phone models produced to date. The phone has a Nokia Series 40 96 x 65 user interface. It was sold in Europe, Russia, Middle East and Africa, while the Nokia 3530 was sold in Asia-Pacific, which operate on GSM 900/1800, and features a more conventional keypad.

Another variant, the Nokia 3590, was released to the North American market in 2003. It operates on GSM-1900 and GSM-850 networks. The phone was at one time available through the former AT&T GoPhone prepaid mobile phone service. The Nokia 3560 was also released the same year, with a different keypad, and operating on TDMA and AMPS for roaming. IS-136. It was sold until early 2004, when TDMA accounts were no longer being activated. This was followed by the Nokia 3595, featuring a different keypad and instead operating on GSM-1900 and GSM-850 networks.

Yet another variant, the Nokia 3585, was released in 2002, sporting a 96x65 pixel grayscale display that operates on CDMA2000 1X network. There is an enhanced model, the Nokia 3585i.

== Technical data ==
Model	3510	3510i
CPU	UPP8M v1.1	UPP8M v2.2
UEM	UEMK v4.4	UEMK v4.4
RF	MJOELNER S2006	MJOELNER S2006
Flashmemory	876,701 bytes	876,701 bytes

UEM - Universal Energy Management

== Accessories ==
Type	Partsnumber
Battery	BLC-2 LiON; BMC-3 NiMH (3510 only)
Headset	HDC-5 (standard); HDB-5 (boom); HDD-1 (dual ear); HDC-10 (retractable); CARK-134 (car kit); PPH-1 (no holder+antenna); HDR-1 (music); HDE-2; LPS-3 (inductive)
Data cable	OEM only or DIY
Charger	DDC-1 (standard); ACP-12 (fast & light)

Data port:

↑ Towards battery connector ↑
NC	1-GND	2-Vpp
3-Fbus RX	4-Mbus	5-Fbus TX

Fbus and Mbus uses 3,3 volt levels.
