= Nokia 7260 =

Nokia brand cell phone model

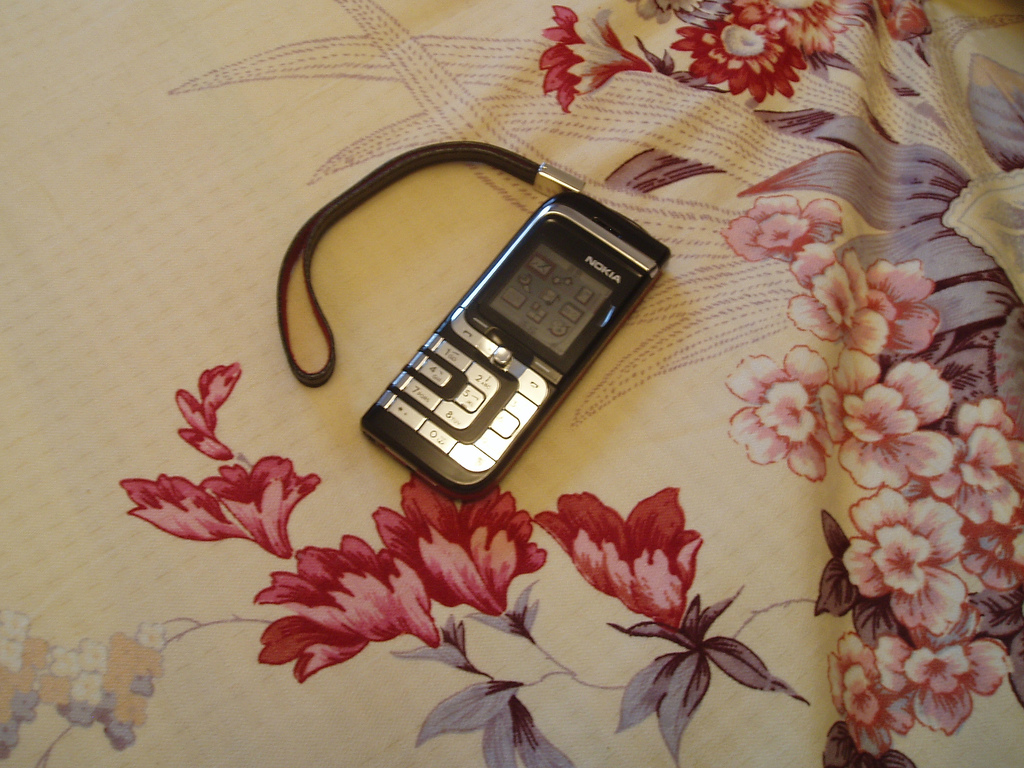
Nokia 7260 mobile phone

The Nokia 7260 is a fashion mobile phone made by Nokia. It was one of three fashion phones released together by Nokia brand in 2004: the others being Nokia 7270 and Nokia 7280. The Nokia 7260 has a 128x128 pixel screen, tri-band GSM connectivity, EDGE data processing capability, and FM radio functionality.

The design of these phones are considered by some to represent a continuation of the "fashion phones" theme which was seemingly popular at the time. "Fashion" centric mobile phones, were associated with a trend in the late 1990s to around 2010 that Nokia, in particular, as well as other mobile phone sellers/designers, elaborated upon through the design of their associated products.

The phone was notable for the black and silver, and or white and silver (depending on specific sub-model) coloration motif that defined the aesthetic of the phones. The design of the phone is also notable for the unusual shape of the case/body. Though the Nokia 7260's case/body shape was somewhat unique, it was not as unusual as that of some of their other fashion phones, for example, the Nokia 7280.

The Nokia 3220 and 6020 had similar hardware specifications to the 7260, with different software and ringtones installed. The 3220 was mainly marketed towards the youth market, the 6020 mainly towards business users, and the 7260 towards fashion-oriented individuals.
