= Nokia 6010 =

Mobile phone

- Manufacturer: Nokia
- First released: 2004
- Predecessor: Nokia 3590
- Successor: Nokia 6030
- Compatible networks: GSM 850 1900
- Form factor: Candy bar
- Dimensions: 119 mm (4.7 in) H 50 mm (2.0 in) W 23 mm (0.91 in) D
- Weight: 111 g (3.9 oz)
- Operating system: Series 40
- Battery: Nokia BLC-2; 1000 mAh; 3.6 V Internal rechargeable li-ion User replaceable
- Display: 96 × 65 px 4096 colors (12-bit)
- Sound: Polyphonic
- Connectivity: SyncML
- Data inputs: Keypad

The Nokia 6010 is an entry-level mobile phone with a Nokia Series 40 96 × 65 color user interface. It was released in 2004 and is compatible with the GSM-850 and GSM-1900 networks in North America.

Data transfer and mobile Internet WAP 2.0 services are handled by GPRS. Users can download Java apps, background pictures, and polyphonic ringtones.

The phone is an update to the Nokia 3595, with the Nokia 6010 having a style more aimed at corporate customers. Many of the 3595's software issues were fixed in the revised firmware that came with the 6010 model. The phone has an IM client for ICQ and AOL Instant Messenger in addition to supporting SMS and MMS messaging. A calendar with thirty entries, a voice command system, an alarm clock, a stopwatch, a calculator, and an alarm clock are among the basic features. The 6010 model is of the DCT4 hardware generation. The faceplate can be customized with an Xpress-on changeable cover. Any Xpress-on shells from the Nokia 3510 family are fully compatible. The phone does not have a camera.

== Reception ==
The Nokia 6010 was a basic mobile phone model released by Nokia in 2004. It featured a color display, basic calling and messaging capabilities, and a simple design. While it may not have had the advanced features of contemporary smartphones, it was popular for its durability and reliability.
