= Nokia 6610 =

2002 mobile phone from Nokia

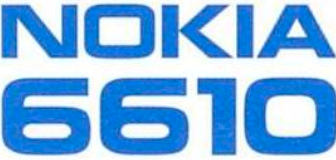

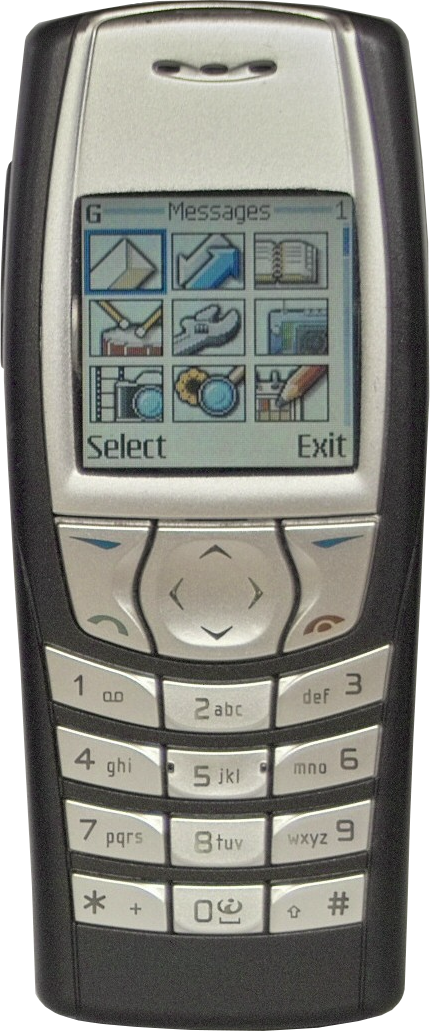
- The 6610i with a black cover.
- Manufacturer: Nokia
- Availability by region: October 2002
- Predecessor: Nokia 3610 (6610); Nokia 3560 (6560); Nokia 3585 (6585); Nokia 6590 (6610); Nokia 6590i (6610i)
- Successor: Nokia 6220 (6560); Nokia 6225 (6585); Nokia 6230 (6610); Nokia 6230i (6610i)
- Related: Nokia 6100; Nokia 7210; Nokia 7250
- Compatible networks: GSM 900/1800/1900 (6610/6610i); TDMA 850/1900 AMPS 850 (6560); CDMA 850/1900 AMPS 850 (6585)
- Form factor: Candybar
- Dimensions: 106 x 45 x 17.5 mm, 83 cc (4.17 x 1.77 x 0.69 in)
- Weight: 83 g (2.93 oz)
- Operating system: Series 40 1st Edition
- Memory: 725kb (6610); 4MB (6610i)
- Battery: BLD-3
- Display: Passive matrix (CSTN), 4,096-colour display (128 x 128 pixels), 1.5 inches (~121 ppi pixel density)
- Connectivity: Pop-Port

The Nokia 6610 is a handset by Nokia that uses the Series 40 platform and J2ME (Java). The device features text and picture messaging, a WAP browser, Stereo FM radio, Polyphonic ringtones and a 128x128, 4096-colour display. It is essentially the same phone feature-wise as the Nokia 7210, the 6610 being a more business-oriented version with a more conservatively-styled face plate and keypad layout, in contrast with the fashion-oriented 7210. It was introduced at CommunicAsia in June 2002 and was released in Q3 of the year.

== Variants ==
=== 6610i ===
The Nokia 6610i mobile telephone is an improved version of the Nokia 6610 with a built-in digital camera, launched in 2004. The phone's internals are taken from the Nokia 7250i, and use the same software, both supporting XHTML. The Nokia 6610i is aimed at business users, while the Nokia 7250i is intended more to be a fashion phone.

=== CDMA variant - 6585 ===
The Nokia 6585 is a physically identical variant of the 6610 for CDMA2000 1xRTT networks. Like its GSM cousin, the 6585 comes in a similar form factor, and can be customised with interchangeable face plates.

=== AMPS/D-AMPS-based model - 6560 ===
The Nokia 6560 model is a variant of the 6610 designed for North American markets that uses Digital AMPS ("TDMA")/AMPS technology. As with the CDMA and GSM variants, the 6560 uses the same fascia and form factor. This was Nokia's most feature-rich D-AMPS phone to ever be released, and only one of two models with a color display (the other being the Nokia 3560).
