= FBus =

Data protocol

Fbus (for "Fast Bus") is an ANSI/IEEE data bus protocol oriented towards backplanes and cell phones. The standard specifies a way for various pieces of electronic hardware to communicate, typically with one piece acting as master (sending a request), and another acting as a slave (returning an answer). The FBus is a bi-directional full-duplex serial type bus running at 115,200 bit/s, 8 data bits, no parity, one stop bit (8N1). Much like a standard RS-232 serial port, FBus connections use one pin for data transmit, one pin for data receive and one pin for ground.

The Fast Bus standard specifies completely the size, power requirements, signalling levels, and communications protocols for boards that live in a Fast Bus crate, which is also a part of the specification.

Fbus was developed by Nokia as an improved replacement of the Mbus, which is only half-duplex and transfers at a slower speed of 9600 bit/s.

== Interfacing with a cell phone ==
The Fast Bus connection on a cell phone can be interfaced with an RS-232 serial port by building a custom cable.
