= Nokia Pop-Port =

Plug-in port for Nokia mobile phones

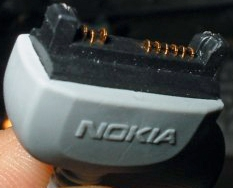
Pop-Port connector of an original Nokia HS-5 headset

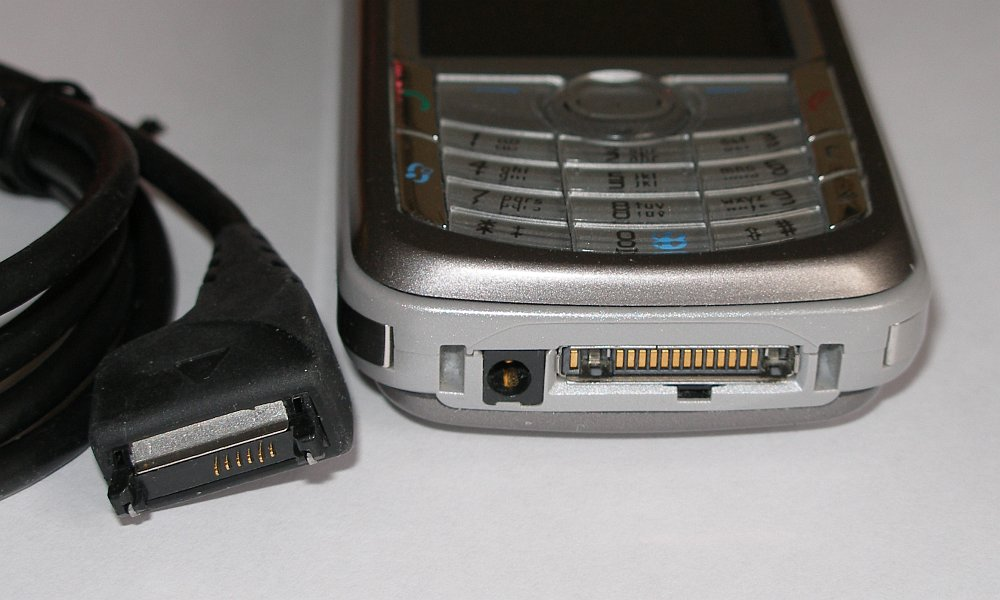
Pop-Port on Nokia 6680

The Pop-Port interface (originally codenamed "Tomahawk") was a proprietary plug-in port for accessories and data synchronisation, available with many Nokia mobile phones. The port consists of one metal pin on either end, and a plastic tab containing thirteen contacts. Pop-Port-like interfaces first appeared in Nokia phones since circa 1996, but the Pop-Port was standardised as a single interface in 2002.

By early 2007 the Pop-Port was fully replaced by the industry standard USB (miniUSB, and later by microUSB) sockets for data services and a 4-part 2.5mm or 3.5mm "standard" TRRS socket for audio. Nokia had been equipping certain devices with one of these connectors as alternatives from about 2004.

Nokia filed "Pop-Port" as a trademark in the United States on September 3, 2002.

== Functions ==
The port carries signals for hands-free microphone, stereo speakers, FBus Rx/Tx or USB signals for the phones supporting them, power output for feeding the accessories that do not have their own batteries, and the Accessory Control Interface (ACI), a bidirectional serial control bus for connection and authentication of phone accessories, with a specific ASIC inside accessories and a proprietary protocol. It is also used to upgrade USB-enabled phones' software using a specific USB data cable and the Nokia Software Updater. Earlier cables connected to RS-232 but later was replaced by USB.

== Criticisms ==
A common problem with Pop-port was that contacts often lost connection, thus resulting in drop-outs in audio (when a hands-free device is used) or an unstable data connection (when a USB cable is used). This was a common problem when listening to music from the phone while the phone was in a pocket. The more stable 2.5 mm and 3.5 mm audio sockets aren't prone to such problems.

The contacts are exposed to dust and dirt, more so than those of a TRRS socket. This, combined with the small size of the contacts, prevented connections in some cases. Also, the plug's 'hook' tended to lose its hooking capability, making it even easier to accidentally lose connection. The data cables had to be original in most cases.

== Available Pop-Port plug-ins ==
- Camera
- FM radio
- Headphones
- LCD remote controller
- USB cable
- 3.5mm stereo plug adapter
- Flash
- 8P8C (RJ-45) cable (CA-41)
- CarKit

== See also ==
- Sony Ericsson's FastPort
