= Nokia Navigator =

Nokia Navigator may refer to:

- Nokia 6110 Navigator
- Nokia 6210 Navigator
- Nokia 6710 Navigator
