= Nokia 6600 (disambiguation) =

Nokia 6600 generally refers to the mobile phone released in 2003. It may also refer to:

- Nokia 6600 slide
- Nokia 6600 fold
- Nokia 6600i slide
