= Nokia 2710 Navigation Edition =

GPS feature phone

- Brand: Nokia
- Manufacturer: Nokia
- Type: Feature phone
- Series: Nokia 2000 series
- First released: May 2010
- Compatible networks: GSM 850 / 900 / 1800 / 1900
- Form factor: Bar
- Colors: Jet Black, Warm Silver, and White Silver
- Dimensions: 111.2 mm (4.38 in) H, 45.7 mm (1.80 in) W, 13.7 mm (0.54 in) D
- Weight: 87 g (3.1 oz)
- Operating system: Series 40, 6th Edition
- Memory: 64 MB RAM
- Storage: 128 MB ROM
- Removable storage: microSDHC, up to 16 GB (2 GB included)
- Battery: Removable Li-Ion 1020 mAh (BL-5C)
- Rear camera: 2 MP; Video: 320p@15fps
- Display: 2.2 in (56 mm) TFT LCD, 256K colors Resolution: 240 x 320 pixels, 4:3 ratio (~182 ppi density)
- Media: MP3/WAV/eAAC+/WMA player, Stereo FM radio with RDS, 3.5mm jack
- Connectivity: GPRS Class 32, EDGE Class 10, Bluetooth 2.1 (A2DP, EDR), microUSB 2.0
- Data inputs: Built-in GPS (with A-GPS), Nokia Maps, Accelerometer, Compass

The Nokia 2710 Navigation Edition is a GPS feature phone that was manufactured and branded by Nokia in December 2009, with launch date on December 11, 2009 in Cairo, Egypt. It was the "most affordable" GPS phone to be featured, with a button to launch Nokia Maps on the right side of the D-pad.

== History and release ==
Nokia officially unveiled the 2710 Navigation Edition on 7 December 2009 in Cairo, Egypt. The device was part of Nokia's initiative to integrate satellite positioning into lower-cost feature phones running the Series 40 platform, complementing their higher-end Nokia Nseries and Eseries Symbian smartphones.

The phone launched commercially in May 2010. To emphasize its navigation focus, the retail sales package included an extensive set of in-car accessories, such as the Nokia CR-118 mobile holder, a windshield suction mount, a DC-4S car charger, and a pre-installed 2 GB microSD card containing regional map data.

== Design and hardware ==
The Nokia 2710 Navigation Edition features a classic candy-bar form factor with a lightweight plastic body and metallic accents. It weighs 87 grams (3.1 oz) and measures 111.2 by 45.7 by 13.7 millimetres (4.38 in × 1.80 in × 0.54 in).

=== Display and controls ===
- Display: A 2.2-inch TFT LCD panel with a resolution of 240 × 320 pixels (QVGA) capable of displaying 256,000 colors.
- Keypad: Standard 12-key alphanumeric keypad driven by softkeys and a 5-way directional pad.
- Navigator Key: A dedicated silver hardware button located on the right side of the D-pad that directly launches Nokia Maps with a single press.
- Side Keys: A dedicated camera shutter button located on the right side of the frame.

=== Hardware and connectivity ===
The device runs on a 208 MHz ARM9 processor powered by the Broadcom BCM21351 chipset, paired with 64 MB of RAM and 128 MB of internal ROM. Storage can be expanded up to 16 GB via a microSDHC memory card slot.

Connectivity options include:

- Quad-band GSM network compatibility (850/900/1800/1900 MHz) with GPRS Class 32 and EDGE Class 10 data speeds.
- Bluetooth 2.1 with A2DP support.
- MicroUSB 2.0 port for data transfer.
- 2 mm Nokia charging socket and a 3.5 mm audio jack.
- Built-in GPS receiver with A-GPS, digital compass, and accelerometer.

== Software and features ==
The phone operates on Nokia's Series 40 6th Edition platform.

=== Navigation ===
The signature feature of the device was Nokia Maps 2.1 optimized for Series 40:

- Offline Maps: Map databases stored locally on the microSD card allowed turn-by-turn navigation without requiring a cellular network connection.
- Guidance: Integrated turn-by-turn voice guidance for both driving and walking routes.
- Compass Sync: Magnetometer integration to orient the map display automatically according to the user's heading.

=== Multimedia and applications ===
- Camera: 2.0-megapixel rear-facing camera capable of taking 1600 × 1200 pixel stills and recording QVGA video at 15 frames per second.
- Audio/Video: Built-in media player supporting MP3, AAC, WMA, and 3GP files, complemented by a stereo FM radio with RDS.
- Browsing & Apps: Pre-loaded Opera Mini 4.2 browser, MIDP 2.1 Java ME environment, Ovi Contacts, and Nokia Life Tools in select regions.

== Specifications ==
Nokia 2710 Navigation Edition Technical Specifications
Feature	Specification
Operating System	Series 40 6th Edition
Chipset / CPU	Broadcom BCM21351 / 208 MHz ARM9
Memory	64 MB RAM, 128 MB ROM
Storage Expansion	microSD / microSDHC (up to 16 GB, 2 GB included)
Display	2.2 in (56 mm) TFT LCD, 240 × 320 px (~182 ppi), 256K colors
Rear Camera	2.0 MP (1600 × 1200 px), video recording @ 320p 15fps
Battery	Removable 1020 mAh Li-Ion (BL-5C); Talk time: Up to 12.5 hours Standby: Up to 20 days
Cellular Network	GSM 850 / 900 / 1800 / 1900 MHz (2G only)
Local Connectivity	Bluetooth 2.1 + EDR, microUSB 2.0, 3.5 mm audio jack
Positioning	GPS, A-GPS, Accelerometer, Digital Compass
Dimensions	111.2 mm × 45.7 mm × 13.7 mm (4.38 in × 1.80 in × 0.54 in)
Weight	87 g (3.07 oz)

== See also ==
- Nokia 2700 classic
- Nokia 6210 Navigator
- Nokia 6710 Navigator
- Series 40
