= 6600 =

6600 may refer to:

- CDC 6600, a mainframe computer from Control Data Corporation, first manufactured in 1965
- Nokia 6600, a Nokia smartphone released in 2003
- Nokia 6600 fold, a Nokia mobile phone released in 2008
- Nokia 6600 slide, a Nokia mobile phone released in 2008
- GeForce 6 series § GeForce 6600 Series, an Nvidia graphics card
- Radeon RX 6600 series, a line of graphics processing units from AMD
- Compaq Presario 6600 Desktop PC (HP) computers
- Audiovox Audiovox ppc6600, a powerpc based pda/cellphone
- The year in the 7th millennium
