= Dual front =

Dual front is a design concept which allows a device to have two distinctive sides, one for each function. It is most commonly used in camera phones.

== Advantages ==
The main advantage of using a dual fronted device is the enhanced ease of use by having distinctive functions for each side.

For example, having a mobile phone with a dual front for the camera encourages the user to hold the phone horizontally which reduces the learning curve because the buttons and functions are located in similar places to a common digital camera.

== Use in market ==
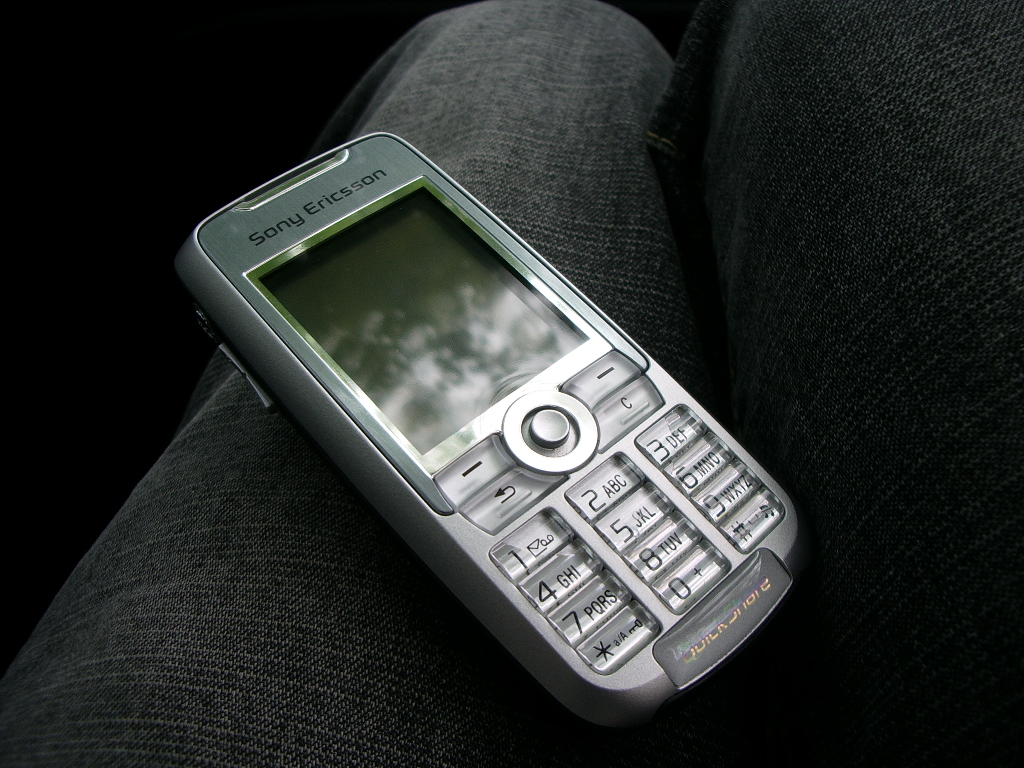
Front side of Sony Ericsson K700i.

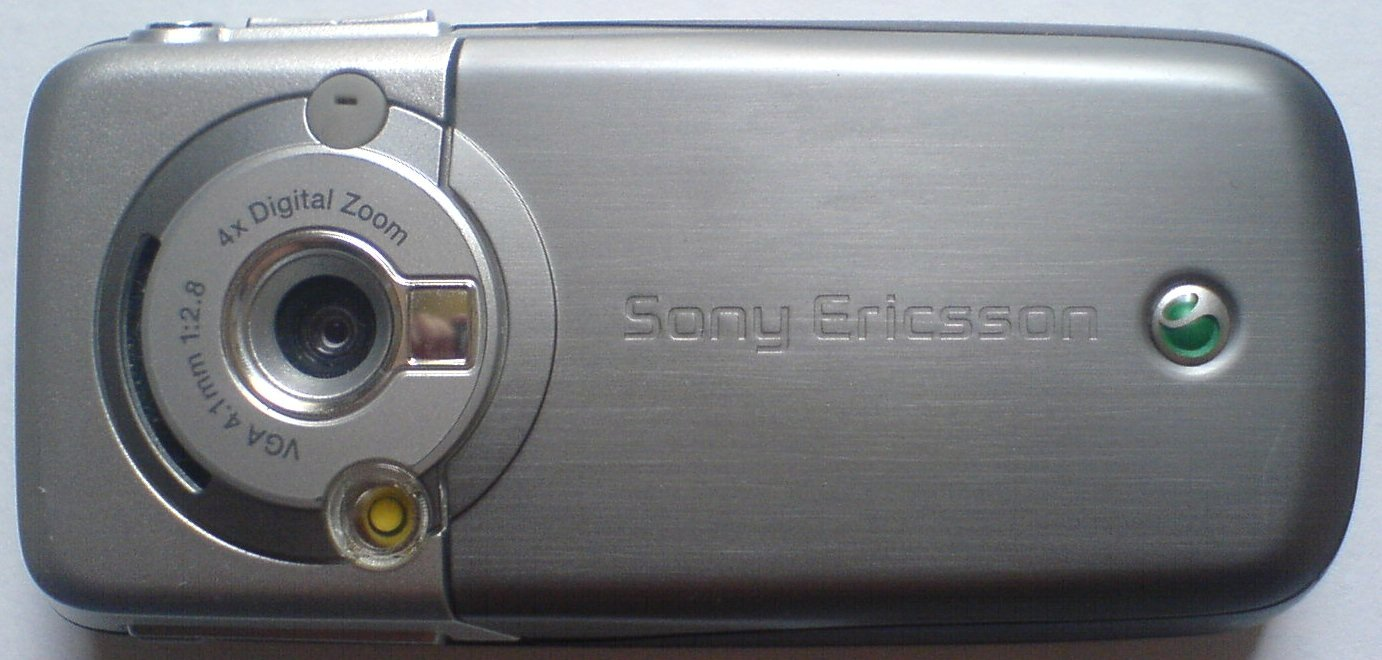
The rear is designed similarly to Sony's Cyber-shot cameras.

The dual front concept began in 2003 when Sony Ericsson started its camera phone range with the T610 and T630 which could be held comfortably in the style of a real digital camera due to its side-mounted shutter button; they also had rear designs which loosely resembled the design of digital cameras. Sony Ericsson described the design of the T630 as 'Putting an end to phones having a front and a back, the T630 has two sides. One for the camera... the other for telephony...'

With the announcement of the K700i and S700i, Sony Ericsson introduced a new marketing term, "Dual front" to refer to camera phone where the "back" of the handset is styled as the "front" of a digital camera, hence the term of "dual front".

The market responded well to this design and Sharp was the next company to begin designing dual front products, by producing a clamshell phone with a dual front design (Sharp 902). This had not been done before on clamshell phones as it was difficult to find a convenient location to put the camera due to the physical limitations.

Nokia, after observing the continued response towards mobile phones with dual front designs announced the 6111 and the 6270/6280 in 2005, all of which had a dual front element to them. They had also previously created a new design which involved the twisting of the top flip in order to create a camcorder like display (as on the 6260). Whilst not strictly dual front, it was later elaborated more to form the N90, N92 and N93.

Samsung's UpStage, released in 2007, features a new form of dual front design, where one side is the phone side and the other side resembles an MP3 player.

== Other uses ==
Sony Ericsson also used the dual front design in the Japan release, the Sony Ericsson Radiden. On the back it had a separate screen for accessing radio functions.
