= Nokia 3600 =

Nokia 3600 may refer to:

- Nokia 3650, a 2002 phone marketed in North America as the Nokia 3600.
- Nokia 3600 slide, a 2008 phone
