= Nokia 6720 classic =

2009 cell phone model

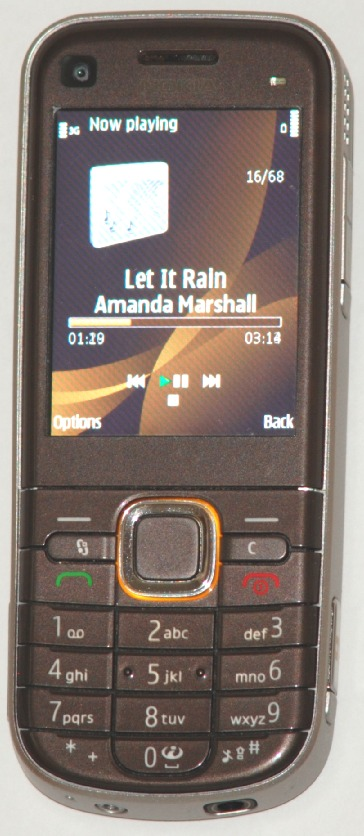
- Manufacturer: Nokia
- Availability by region: 16 February 2009
- Predecessor: Nokia 6220 Classic
- Related: Nokia 3120 classic Nokia 6710 Navigator; Nokia 6730 classic Nokia E52/E55; Nokia E72
- Compatible networks: GPRS, EDGE, EGPRS, HSCSD, CSD, GSM 900, GSM 1800, GSM 1900, 3G
- Form factor: Candybar
- Dimensions: 110.0×45.0×14.0 mm (4.33×1.77×0.55 in)
- Weight: 110 g (4 oz)
- Operating system: S60 Platform
- Memory: 128 MB RAM (internal)
- Removable storage: microSD (up to 16 GB)
- Battery: BP-6MT 1050 Li-Polymer battery mAh
- Rear camera: 5.0 megapixels
- Display: 320 x 240 pixels LCD (16.7 million colors)
- Connectivity: Bluetooth 2.0, Mini USB, 3.5mm headset port
- Data inputs: Keypad

The Nokia 6720 is a mid-range Symbian OS mobile phone released by Nokia. It was unveiled to public in Barcelona and Singapore on February 16, 2009. It is the successor of the Nokia 6220 classic and features several improvement over its predecessor, such as the addition of A-GPS and noise cancellation. Like the 6220, it offers features comparable to the higher end models, although the Xenon flash previously featured in the 6220 is now replaced by a conventional LED flash for higher power efficiency.

== Specifications ==
- 2.2 inches, 240 x 320 pixels
- microSD, up to 16 GB, 1 GB included
- 50 MB shared memory
- ARM 11 600 MHz processor
- HSDPA, 10.2 Mbit/s
- HSUPA, 2 Mbit/s
- Bluetooth v2.0 with A2DP
- microUSB
- Symbian OS, S60 rel. 3.2
- 5MP, 2592×1944 pixels, Carl Zeiss Optics, autofocus, video(VGA@15), LED flash; secondary VGA videocall camera
- Built-in GPS receiver
- A-GPS support
- Nokia Maps 3.0
- Stereo FM radio with RDS
- 3.5 mm AV jack
- TV-out
