= Sony Ericsson K610i =

Mobile phone model

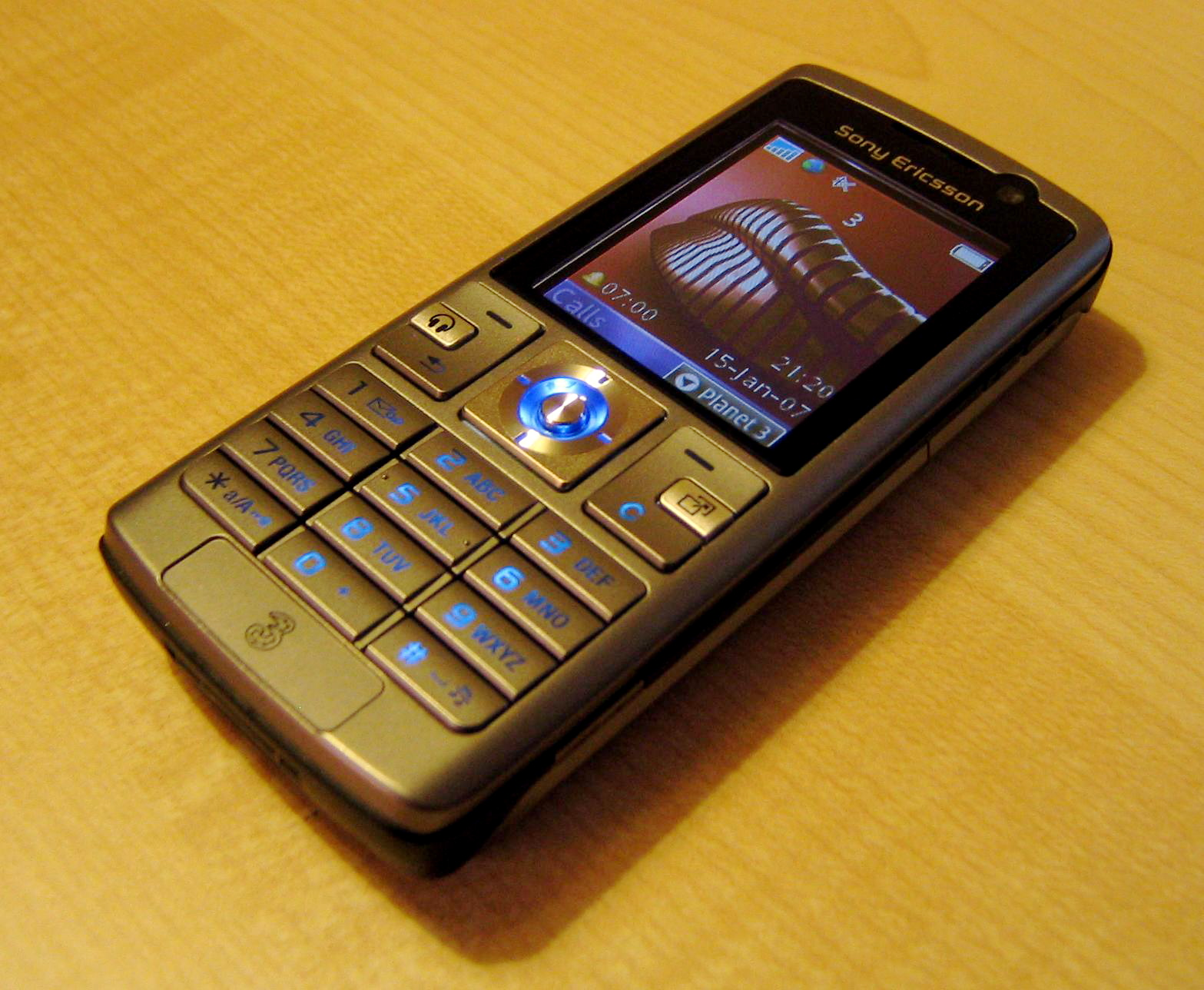
- Related: Sony Ericsson W660i
- Compatible networks: GSM/GPRS 900/1800/1900 MHz; UMTS 2100 MHz
- Form factor: Candybar
- Dimensions: 102×45.2×16.9 mm (4.02×1.78×0.67 in)
- Weight: 92 g (3 oz) (0.203 lb)
- Memory: 16 MB
- Removable storage: Memory Stick Micro (M2)
- Battery: Li-polymer
- Rear camera: 2 Mpx
- Display: 176×220 pixels, 262,144 Colour TFT LCD
- Sound: 72-voice polyphonic, MP3
- Connectivity: Bluetooth, USB 2.0

The Sony Ericsson K610i is a 3G phone that Sony Ericsson announced at the 3GSM World Congress on February 13, 2006. It was promoted as the smallest and lightest 3G phone available. It has been succeeded by the K530.

== Features ==
The K610 is a successor to the Sony Ericsson K600i. Its features include a fixed-focus 2 megapixel digital camera with 2.5× digital zoom (zoom only available when set to the VGA quality setting), Bluetooth v2.0 and support of Sony's new proprietary memory card format, Memory Stick Micro (M2). It has a slightly bigger 1.9 inch, 262,000 colour, 176×220 pixel TFT LCD screen, built-in email client, WAP and HTML browser and a D-pad for navigation. The K610i also supports many music formats including MP3/AAC/M4A/WMA.

== Design ==
- The K610 is a small candybar style phone which is comparable in size to the K750, which is only 2 mm shorter, 0.8 mm wider and 3.6 mm thicker. It features larger and more ergonomic buttons than the K600/K608. Comparing the phone to current 3G phones available these days, it seems that the K610 is far smaller and slimmer than even some recent 2G phones.
- Navigation is provided by the central D-pad which is used for navigation of menus. The two soft keys provide greater flexibility whilst navigating and the popular activity button and web browser buttons are still included in the minimalist design.
- The camera is located on the reverse side of the phone and in accordance to Sony Ericsson's dual front design philosophy, common to most Sony Ericsson camera phones, the phone is held in a horizontal position when taking pictures. In this position, a small button on the right bottom side of the phone functions as the shutter release.

== K618/V630 ==
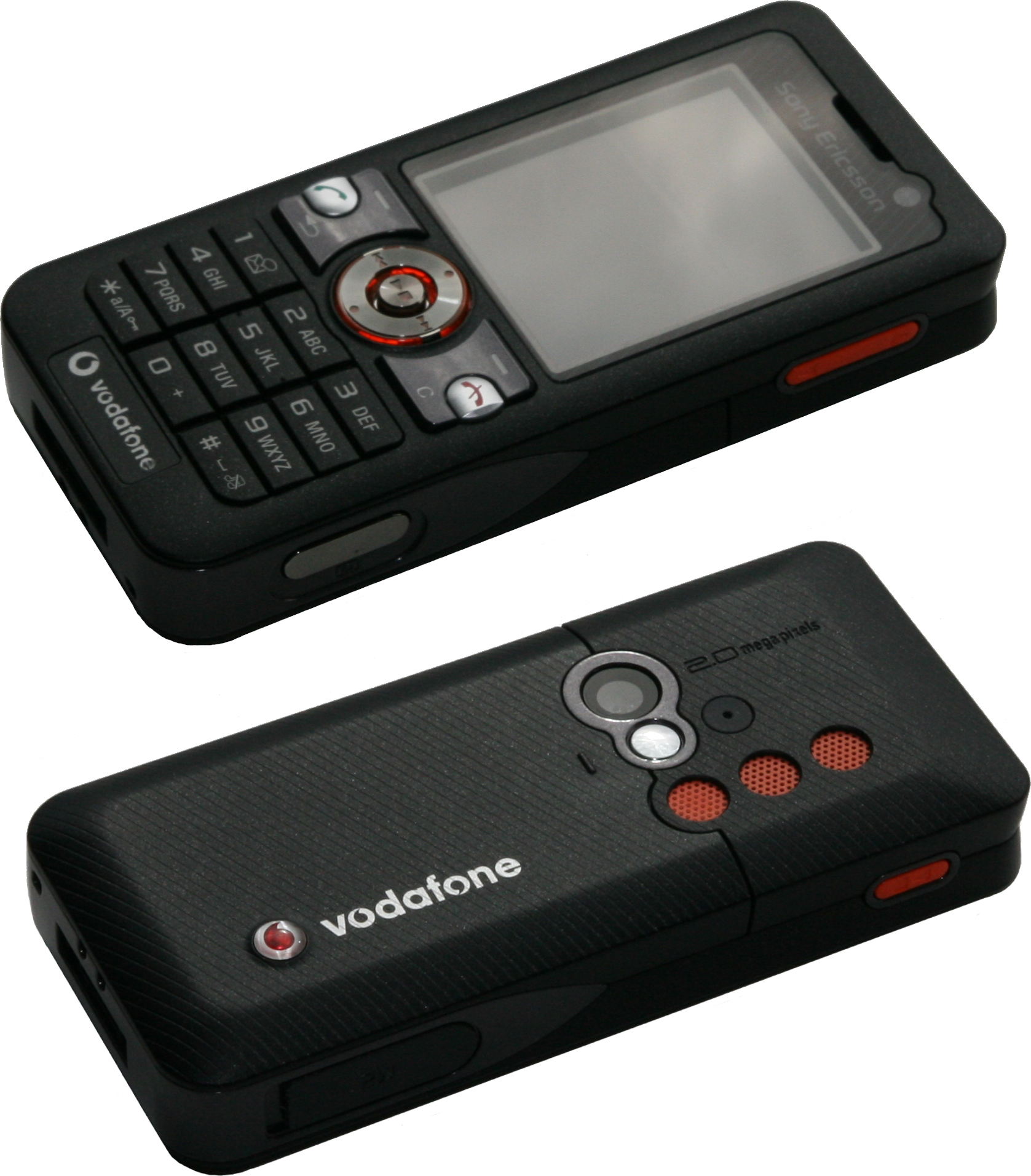
Sony Ericsson V630 vodafone

The base hardware for the K610i has been transferred into two similar phones, the K618 and the V630. Both share a similar design different to that of the original K610i yet have identical features, the only difference being a 2g mass difference and the ability to 'Photoblog' on the V630. The V630 is specifically aimed at Vodafone users, with case branding, simlocking and a red oriented interface with unique Vodafone icons, similar to that across the range of Vodafone branded phones.

== Reviews ==
Although being relatively small for a phone with its features, the K610 was criticized for not including several common features found in other contemporary mobile phones, namely its lack of an FM radio, IrDA, and LED lights for taking pictures in low lighting conditions, as well as its sub-par photo quality.

== Modding ==
Since K610i and W660i have relatively similar hardware specifications and a similar mainboard, soft modifications are available to convert a K610i to a W660i by using flashing software and the firmware files of the W660i model. Such modified phone will be able to use the Walkman feature which is available to W series phones only however will be unable to use the radio function of the Walkman phone due to the lack of radio tuner in the original K610i.

This modification will revoke any remaining warranty for the phone.

== See also ==
- List of Sony Ericsson products
