= Nokia 6111 =

Mobile phone model

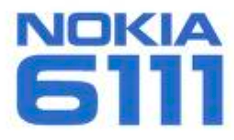

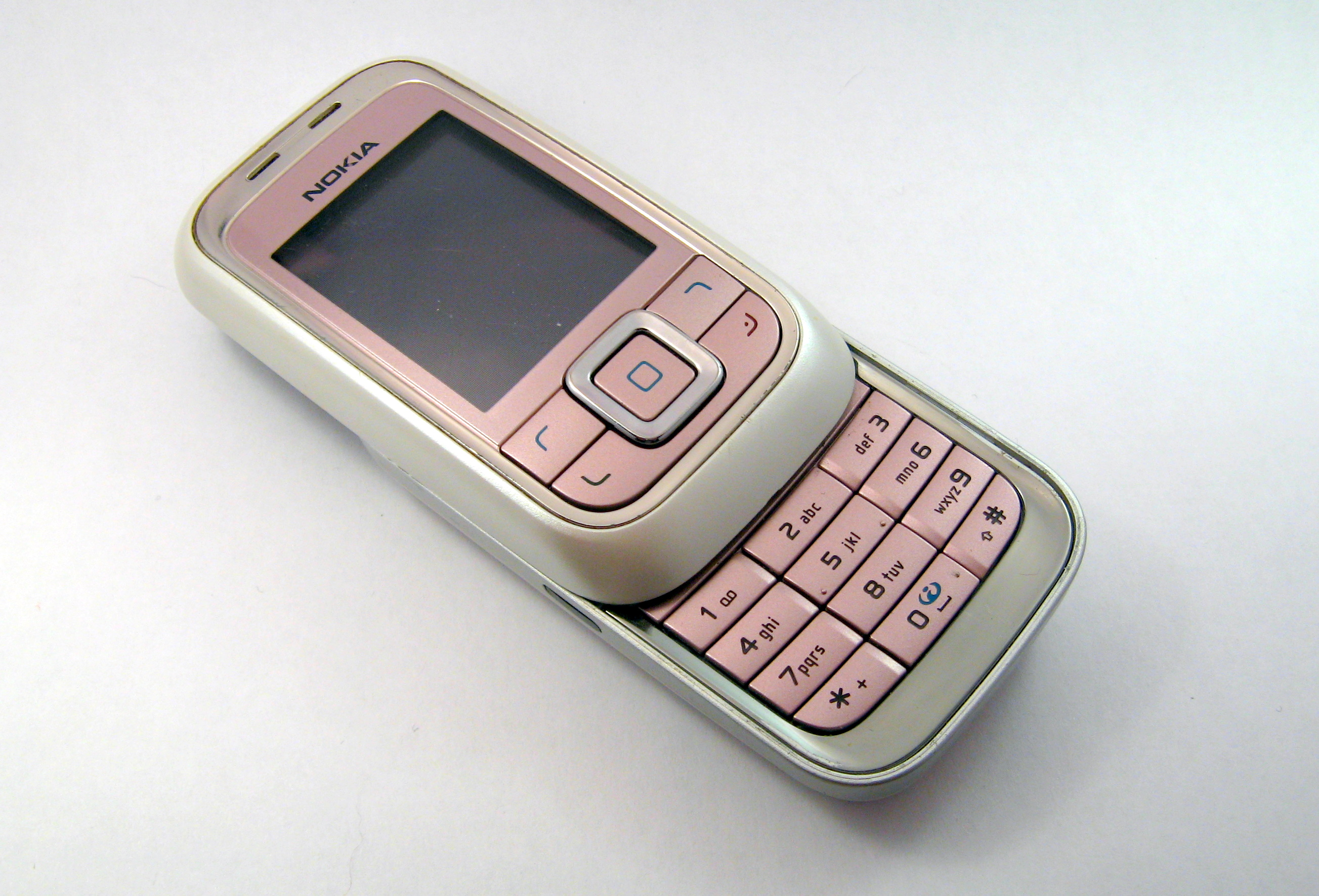
- Availability by region: 10 June 2005
- Successor: Nokia 6110 Navigator; Nokia N81
- Related: Nokia 6270; Nokia 6280 Series
- Compatible networks: GSM 900/1800/1900
- Form factor: Slide
- Dimensions: 84×47×23 mm (3.31×1.85×0.91 in)
- Operating system: Nokia S40 3rd Edition
- Memory: 23 MB shared
- Rear camera: 1-megapixel, QCIF video
- Display: LCD

The Nokia 6111 is a mid-level GSM mobile phone released in June 2005. It sold in Asia, Europe, Australia, Brazil and in Mexico, but was not taken by any carriers in the United States.

The 6111 is a compact slider handset that features a megapixel camera with flash and video capture, Bluetooth, and EDGE high-speed data.

It was being one of first devices running Nokia Series 40 3rd Edition, along with Nokia 6233, Nokia 6270 and Nokia 6280 which also offers even QVGA display resolution and better multimedia support, as well as Push-to-talk over Cellular, IrDA, a stop watch which can run in background, count lap times and save sessions, and the ability to use other device features while a phone call is active in background. It was also the company's second phone with sliding keypad since the Series 60-based Nokia 7650 (released in 2002).

== Camera ==
The one megapixel camera offers a resolution of 1152x864 pixels, and video recording at QCIF (176×144).

The night mode on the camera facilitates capturing photos in dim light. There is an attached LED flash with the camera which turns on while the photo is being taken, illuminating close targets. There is a small reflective surface next to the lens that acts as a mirror when taking self-photos.

== Other specifications ==
The phone weighs 92 g (with a user-replaceable Li-Ion battery) and has dimensions of 84x47x23 mm. The volume has 10 levels is controlled via two plastic buttons on the top right side of the phone. The phone has five games: Champ Rally 3D, Golf Tour, Backgammon II, Solitaire and Sketcher.

The shell comes in a variety of colors including silver on pearl white, glossy black on silver, and pink on silver.

== Specifications ==
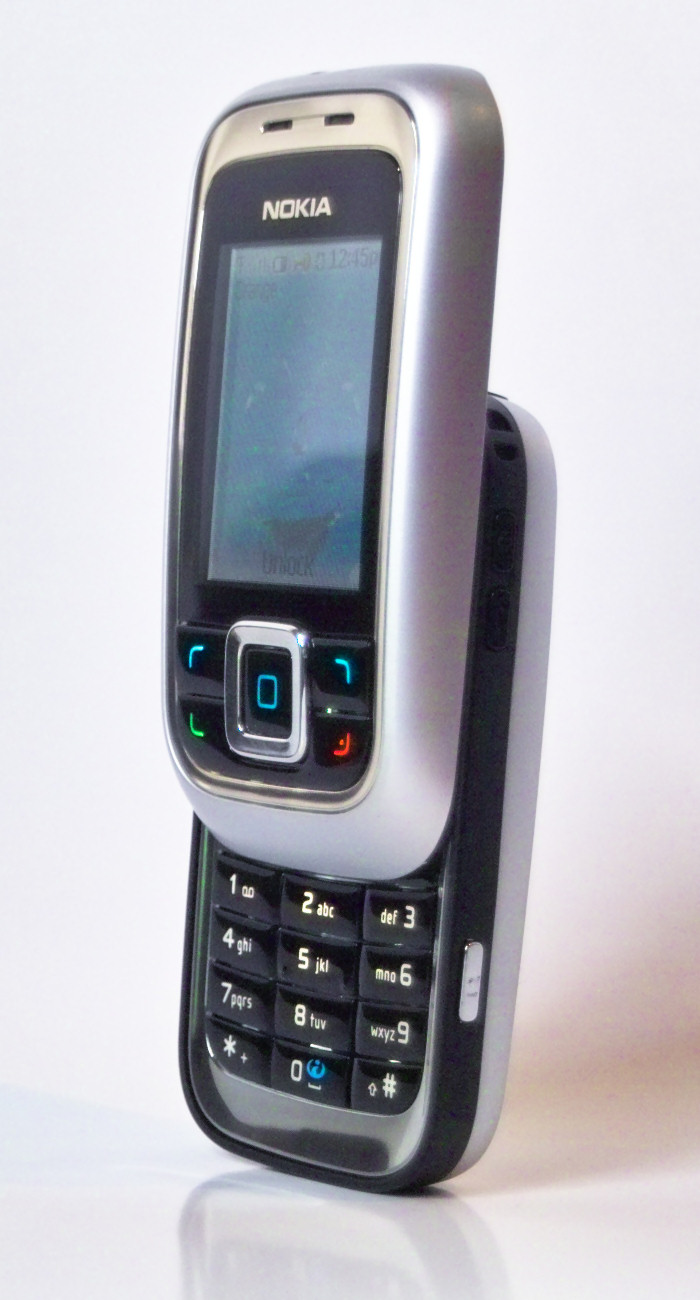
Sliding mechanism

- Modes: GSM 900/1800/1900
- Weight: 6.25 oz (177 g)
- Dimensions: 3.32" x 1.85" x 0.91" (84 x 47 x 23 mm)
- Form Factor: Slide with Internal Antenna
- Battery Life Talk: 3.50 hours
- Standby: 92 hours
- Battery: Li-Ion
- Display Type: LCD (Color TFT/TFD)
- Colors: 262,144 (18-bit)
- Size: 128 x 160 pixels
- Memory: 23 MB

== Data ==
- GPRS: Class 10 (4+1/3+2 slots), 32 - 48 kbit/s
- HSCSD: Yes, 43.2 kbit/s
- EDGE: Class 10, 236.8 kbit/s
- Bluetooth: v2.0
- Infrared port: Yes
- USB: Yes
- opera mini browser

== See also ==
- List of Nokia products
