= E66 =

E66 may refer to:

- E 66 road (United Arab Emirates)
- European route E66
- Nokia E66 smartphone
- BMW E66 car
- Enercon E-66, a wind turbine
- E66, the ICD-10 code for obesity
