= 6110 =

6110 may refer to:

- Nokia 6110, a mobile phone released in 1997
- Nokia 6110 Navigator, a smartphone released in 2007
- A6110 road, in England
