= Nokia 6220 Classic =

Mobile phone

Nokia 6220 classic
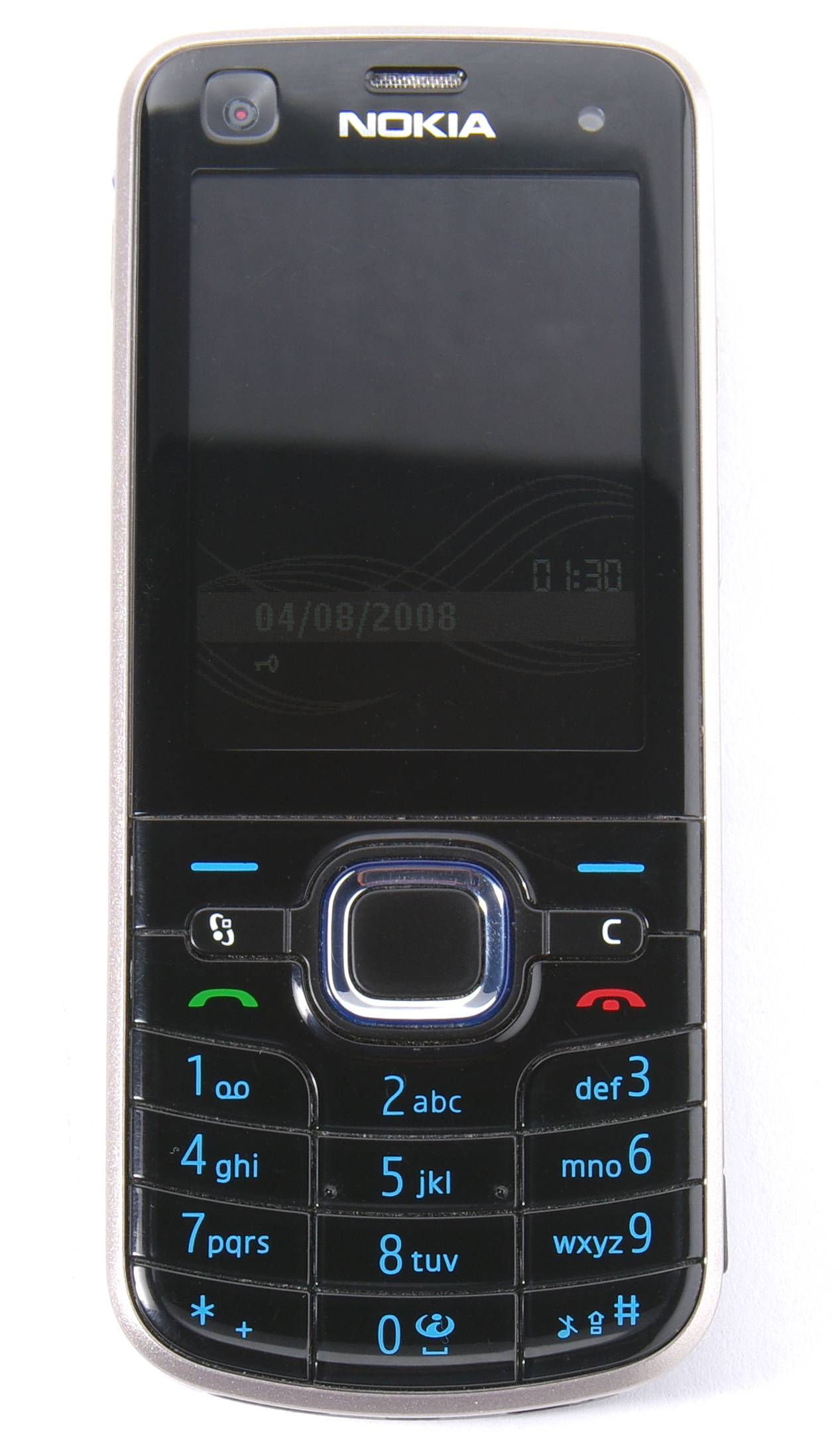
- Manufacturer: Nokia
- Availability by region: July 2008
- Predecessor: Nokia 6120 classic
- Successor: Nokia 6720 classic
- Related: Nokia 3120 classic Nokia 5320 XpressMusic; Nokia 6210 Navigator; Nokia 6260 slide Nokia 6600 slide Nokia N78
- Compatible networks: EGSM 850/900/1800/1900 WCDMA/HSDPA 900/2100
- Form factor: Candybar
- Dimensions: 108×46.5×15.2 mm (4.25×1.83×0.60 in)
- Weight: 90 g (3 oz) (0.20 lb)
- Operating system: Symbian OS 9.3 + S60 platform 3rd Edition, Feature Pack 2
- CPU: ARM11 @ 369 MHz
- Memory: 128 MB (RAM), 256 MB NAND (120 MB free)
- Removable storage: MicroSD(SDHC) (Max 8 GB)
- Battery: BP-5M Battery LiPoly 3.7 V 900 mAh
- Rear camera: 5 MP, AF, xenon flash
- Front camera: 320 × 240 pixels (CIF+ resolution)
- Display: TFT, 2.2 inches, 320 × 240 pixels, 16 million colors
- Connectivity: USB Mass Storage via micro USB, Bluetooth 2.0 with A2DP profile
- Data inputs: Keypad

Nokia 6220 classic is a mid-range Symbian OS smartphone announced by Nokia on 11 February 2008. It is notable for featuring a xenon flash for its 5-megapixel camera, similar to the Nokia N82 released a year prior. As such, it is often considered as a “budget” counterpart of the N82. Despite its compact size, it offers features comparable to the Nseries, though it lacks Wi-Fi and a 3.5 mm audio jack, probably to cut design and production costs.

== Features ==
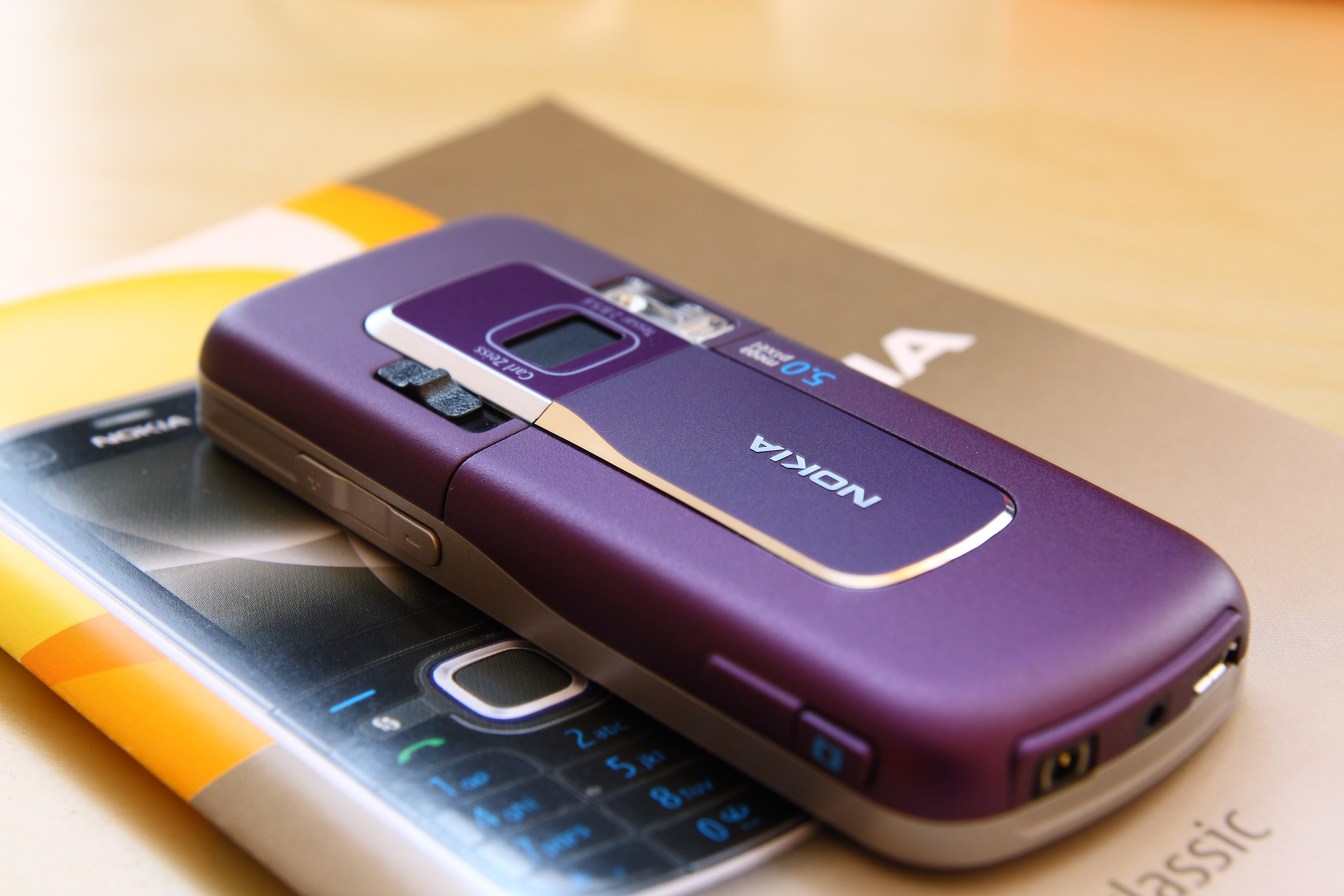
The back of the 6220 classic

- HSDPA-3.6M/10.2M/ WCDMA-900/2100 / DTM EGPRS-850/900/1800/1900 Class 11A/32B
- GPS navigation with Assisted GPS
- Symbian OS 9.3 with the S60 interface, 3rd Edition.
- Secondary frontal camera for video phone calls (CIF+ resolution).
- 2.5 mm headjack for supplied headset.
- Micro USB connector.
- Bluetooth version 2.0 with A2DP profile.
- MicroSD SDHC card slot.
- Stereo FM radio with support for Visual Radio and RDS.
- Audio player supporting MP3, M4A, eAAC+, RealAudio 7,8,10, and WMA formats.
- 5.0-megapixel camera with autofocus, Carl Zeiss lens and Xenon flash.
- Video recording-VGA 640×480 @ 30 fps.
- H.264/MPEG-4 AVC, H.263, RealVideo 7,8,9/10 support.
- Java MIDP 2.1

== See also ==
- Nokia SU-33W
