= Nokia E65 =

Nokia cellphone model

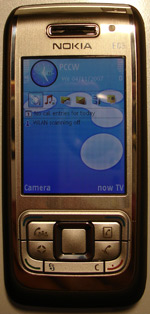
- Manufacturer: Nokia
- First released: February 14, 2007; 19 years ago
- Predecessor: Nokia 6270
- Successor: Nokia E66
- Compatible networks: Quad-band EGSM, WCDMA (3G)
- Form factor: Slide
- Dimensions: 105×49×15.5 mm (4.13×1.93×0.61 in)
- Operating system: S60 platform third edition on Symbian OS
- CPU: ARM 9, 222 MHz
- Memory: microSD (TransFlash), up to 2 GB (hot-swappable), 256 MB card included, ~45 MB SDRAM - 20 MB free memory
- Battery: BL-5F/BL-5FA 3.7 V 950 mAh Li-Po/Li-ion
- Rear camera: 2 MP, 1600 × 1200 pixels,
- Display: Portrait 2,2" QVGA 181 ppi 240 × 320 TFT screen 24 bits (16 million) colors
- Connectivity: GPRS Class 32, 107 kbit/s HSCSD Yes EDGE Class 32, 296 kbit/s; DTM Class 11, 177 kbit/s 3G Wireless LAN Wi-Fi 802.11 b/g, Bluetooth (v. 1.2), Infrared port, USB (Pop-port)

The Nokia E65 is a business mobile phone in the Eseries range, a S60 platform third edition device with slide action. It shares many of the features of the N95 (quad band GSM, 3G, Wi-Fi, and Bluetooth), which was released around the same time, but thinner, lighter and without the GPS. It was followed fairly quickly by the E66, which was very similar, but gained an FM radio, a newer release of S60, A2DP Bluetooth, GPS, and a 3.2-M pixel camera.

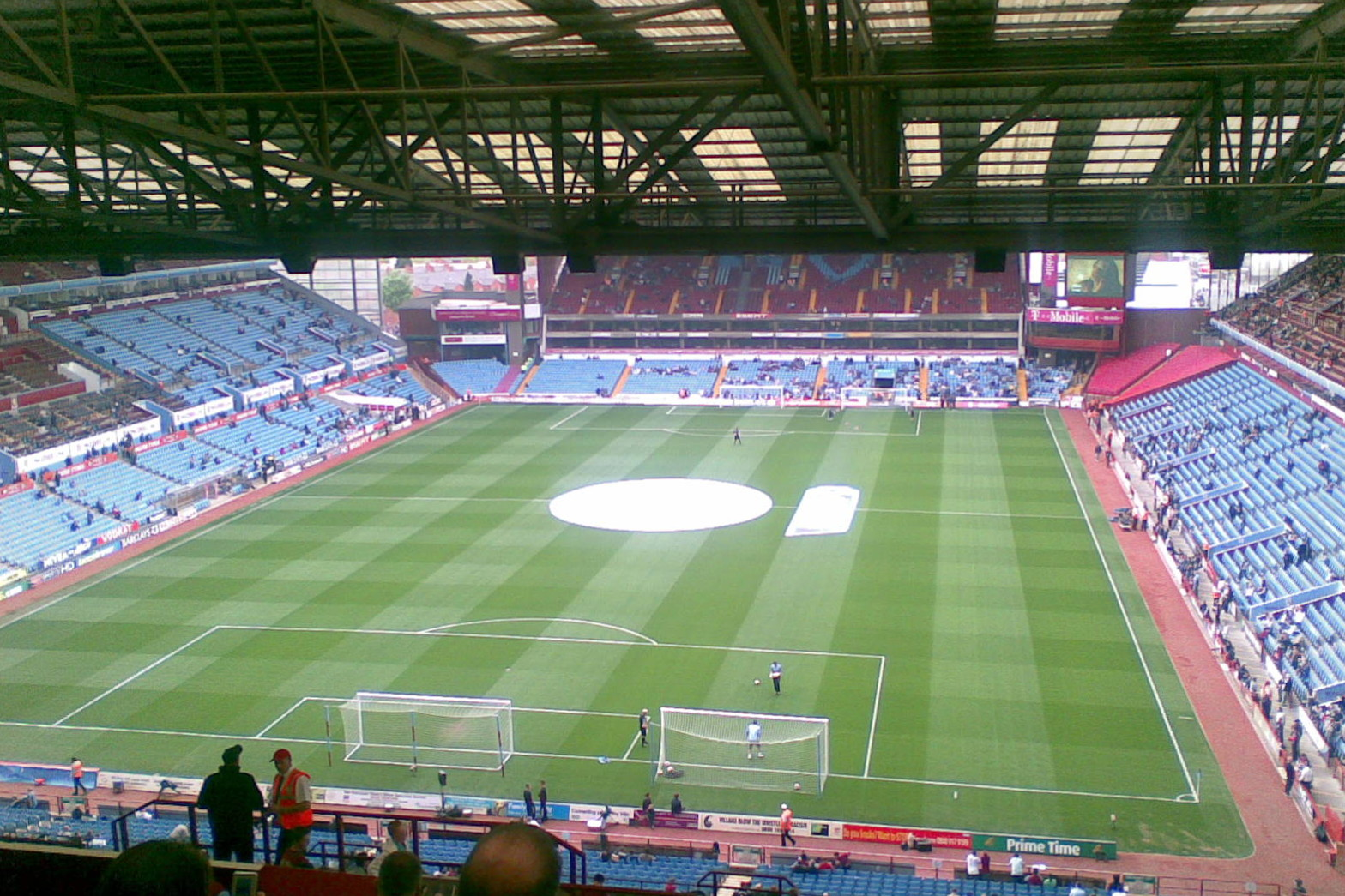
Photograph of Villa Park taken by the Nokia E65

Power management
Battery	Talk time			Standby time		
Battery	GSM	WCDMA	VoIP	GSM	WCDMA	GSM/WCDMA and WLAN
BL-5F/BL-5FA	Up to 3–6 hours	Up to 1.8–2.5 hours	Up to 2	Up to 7–11 days	Up to 8–14 days	Up to 4–5 days

Operation times vary depending on the network and usage.

== Known issues ==
Many users have experienced problems with the SIM connecting to the network after using the phone for some time. This meant that they needed to be either repaired or replaced. The cause seems to be a design problem in the SIM container on the chassis of the phone. The SIM container is mainly built of a thin metal foil, which tends to bend over time, thus disconnecting the SIM from the mobile phone's SIM contacts. However, this problem has often been solved by putting a piece of paper between the metal foil and the SIM, enabling it to make contact.

There are also difficulties in making connection to WLAN networks, which use EAP-PEAP and MSchapV2 protocols if you update the phone's firmware (this is true as of firmware version 3.0633.69).

Other users experience problems with the phone connecting to third-party GPS devices over Bluetooth. This seems to be a compatibility flaw in the Nokia Bluetooth stack of Nokia Maps, as these devices do connect when used with Google Maps on the E65.
