= Nokia 6260 slide =

Nokia mobile phone handset

Nokia 6260
- Manufacturer: Nokia
- Availability by region: April 2009
- Predecessor: Nokia 6280 Series
- Related: Nokia 6210 Navigator; Nokia 6220 classic Nokia 6600 slide
- Compatible networks: UMTS 850/2100 GSM 850/900/1800/1900
- Form factor: Slide
- Dimensions: 99.4×46.5×15.4 mm (3.91×1.83×0.61 in)
- Weight: 114 g (4 oz)
- Operating system: Series 40 6th Edition
- Memory: 200 MB
- Battery: BL-5F 950 mAh
- Rear camera: 0,3 megapixels
- Display: 2.4 inch HVGA LCD (16.7 million colors)
- Connectivity: Bluetooth 2.1, POP PORT

The Nokia 6260 slide is a discontinued mobile telephone handset produced by Nokia, announced on 24 November 2008, and released in April 2009. The handset's internet and sharing features use Wi-Fi and HSDPA/HSUPA data. It also features A-GPS and a five megapixel camera.

== Specification sheet ==
Type	Specification
Modes	GSM 850 / GSM 900 / GSM 1800 / GSM 1900 / WCDMA 900 / WCDMA 1900 / WCDMA 2100
Regional Availability	Middle East, North Africa, SEAP
Weight	114 g
Dimensions	99.4 x 46.5 x 15.4 mm
Form Factor	Slide
Battery Life	Talk Time: 4 hours (GSM), 3 hours (WCDMA) Standby: 300 hours (GSM and WCDMA)
Battery Type	BL-5F 3.7V 950 mAh
Display	Type: LCD (Color TFT/TFD) Colors: 16.7 million (24-bit) Size 2.4" Resolution: 320 x 480 pixels (HVGA)
Platform / OS	BB5 / Nokia Series 40, 6th Edition
Memory	256 MB
Digital TTY/TDD	Yes
Multiple Languages	Yes
Ringer Profiles	Yes
Vibrate	Yes
Bluetooth	Supported Profiles: A2DP, AVRCP, DUN, FTP, GAP, GAVDP, GOEP, HFP, OPP, PBAP, SAP, SDAP, SPP
PC Sync	Yes
USB	Micro-USB
Multiple Numbers per Name	Yes
Voice Dialing	Yes
Custom Graphics	Yes
Custom Ringtones	Yes
Data-Capable	Yes
Flight Mode	Yes
Packet Data	Technology: GPRS MSC 32 (RX+TX: 4+3, 3+2) (max 5 slots), EDGE (EGPRS): MSC 32 (RX+TX 4+3, 3+2) (max 5 slots), WCDMA 2100, maximum speed PS 128/384 kbit/s (UL/DL), CS 12.2 kbit/s, HSUPA, HSDPA, maximum speed 10.2 Mbit/s (DL)
WLAN	802.11b (11 Mbit/s), 802.11g (54 Mbit/s), 902.11d (roaming issues), 802.11i (security issues, WEP, WPA, WPA2, EAP), 802.11e (QoS issues)
WAP / Web Browser	HTML over TCP/IP, WAP 2.0, WebKit Open Source Browser, XHTML over TCP/IP
Predictive Text Entry	T9
Side Keys	volume keys on right
Memory Card Slot	Card Type: microSD up to 16 GB.
Email Client	Protocols Supported: IMAP4, POP3, SMTP supports attachments
MMS	MMS 1.2 / SMIL
Text Messaging	2-Way: Yes
FM Radio	Stereo: Yes
Music Player	Supported Formats: MP3, MP4, AAC, AAC+, eAAC+, WMA, WAV
Camera	Resolution: 5-megapixel (2592 x 1944) with 4x digital zoom
Streaming Video	Protocol: 3GPP
Video Capture	VGA, 15 frame/s, H.263 and MPEG4 format
Alarm	Yes
Calculator	Yes
Calendar	Yes
SyncML	Yes
To-Do List	Yes
Voice Memo	Yes
Games	Yes
Java ME	Version: MIDP 2.1, CLDC 1.1 supported JSRs: 75, 82, 120, 135, 172, 177, 184, 185, 205, 211, 226, 234, 284
Headset Jack	Yes (2.5 mm)
Speaker Phone	Yes
Latest Firmware Version	07.27
