= Nokia 3600 slide =

2008 mobile phone

- Manufacturer: Nokia
- Availability by region: August 2008
- Related: Nokia 2600 classic Nokia 2680 slide Nokia 3120 classic Nokia 6600 fold Nokia 6600 slide
- Compatible networks: GSM 850/900/1800/1900
- Form factor: Slide
- Dimensions: 97.8×47.2×14.5 mm (3.85×1.86×0.57 in) (59.7cc)
- Weight: 97.3 g (3 oz)
- Operating system: Series 40
- Memory: 64 MB internal, up to 4 GB external supported
- Battery: BL-4S 860 mAh
- Rear camera: 3.2 megapixels dual LED flash
- Display: 2 inch QVGA LCD (16.7 million colors)
- Connectivity: Bluetooth 2.0, Micro-USB, Packet Data

The Nokia 3600 slide is a mobile phone by Nokia that was released in August 2008. The phone runs the Series 40 5th Edition platform. This is classed as the 'low end version' of the Nokia 6600 slide, its major difference being the lack of 3G support.

== Features ==
- Operating frequency
  - Quad band GSM / GPRS / EDGE: GSM 850, GSM 900, GSM 1800, GSM 1900
- Music
  - Music player supports MP3, MP4, AAC, eAAC+ & WMA audio formats
  - Up to 10 hours of music playback
  - Stereo headset included with automatic music muting for incoming calls
  - Stereo FM radio - FM radio requires headset to be attached
  - Manage your music on your compatible PC with Nokia Music Manager or Windows Media Player 10 and 11
- Imaging and video
  - 3.2-megapixel camera (2048 x 1536 resolution) with autofocus, 8x digital zoom, and dual LED flash
  - Video Recording supports VGA at 15fps, and QVGA at 30fps
  - Video playback supports MP4, 3pp
  - Video streaming
  - Local video playback: up to 30fps in VGA for H263 and MPEG-4 with 2048 kbit/s bitrate
  - Video to TV-Out: up to 15fps in QVGA with the Nokia Video-Out Cable CA-92U (not included)
  - Still picture to TV-Out in VGA with the Nokia Video-Out Cable CA-92U (not included)
  - Manage your videos with Nokia Video Manager
- Display
  - 2" (320 x 240 pixels) QVGA display supporting up to 16.7 million colors
- Connectivity
  - MicroUSB connector
  - 2.5mm AV connector
  - 2mm charging connector
  - USB 2.0 Full Speed for rapid music transfer
  - Remote SyncML data synchronisation via Bluetooth
  - Packet Data
  - Bluetooth 2.0 with stereo audio profiles for wireless music listening and control
  - Connects to the Nokia Bluetooth GPS Module LD-4W(not included) for GPS location with Nokia Maps
  - OMA DRM 2.0 and Windows Media DRM for digital content protection
  - Device updates with FOTA (firmware over the air)
- Browsing
  - Opera Mini v4 browser
  - xHTML support
  - WML (WAP 2.0) support
  - HTTP/TCP/IP connection
- Memory
  - 64 MB internal memory of which 30 MB is available for user data
  - Expandable using microSD card supports up to 4 GB
- Communication
  - Windows Live Messenger Mobile
  - Flickr
  - Opera Mini
  - Text messaging (SMS)
  - Multimedia Messaging
  - Audio messaging service (AMS) for sending voice clips over-the-air
  - Email client supporting IMAP4, POP3, and SMTP protocols, with a user-friendly setup wizard
  - Video Call Acceptance
  - Download
  - Yahoo! Go
  - Plug and play mobile services
  - Supports Java MIDP 2.0 applications
- Power management
  - BL-4S Battery
  - Up to 5 hrs talk time
  - Up to 14.2 days standby time
  - 860 mAh

== Related handsets ==
- Nokia 6500 slide
- Nokia 6600 fold
- Nokia 6600 slide
