= Nokia 6280 Series =

Series of mobile phones

Nokia 6280
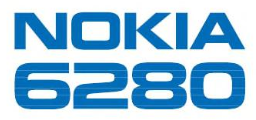

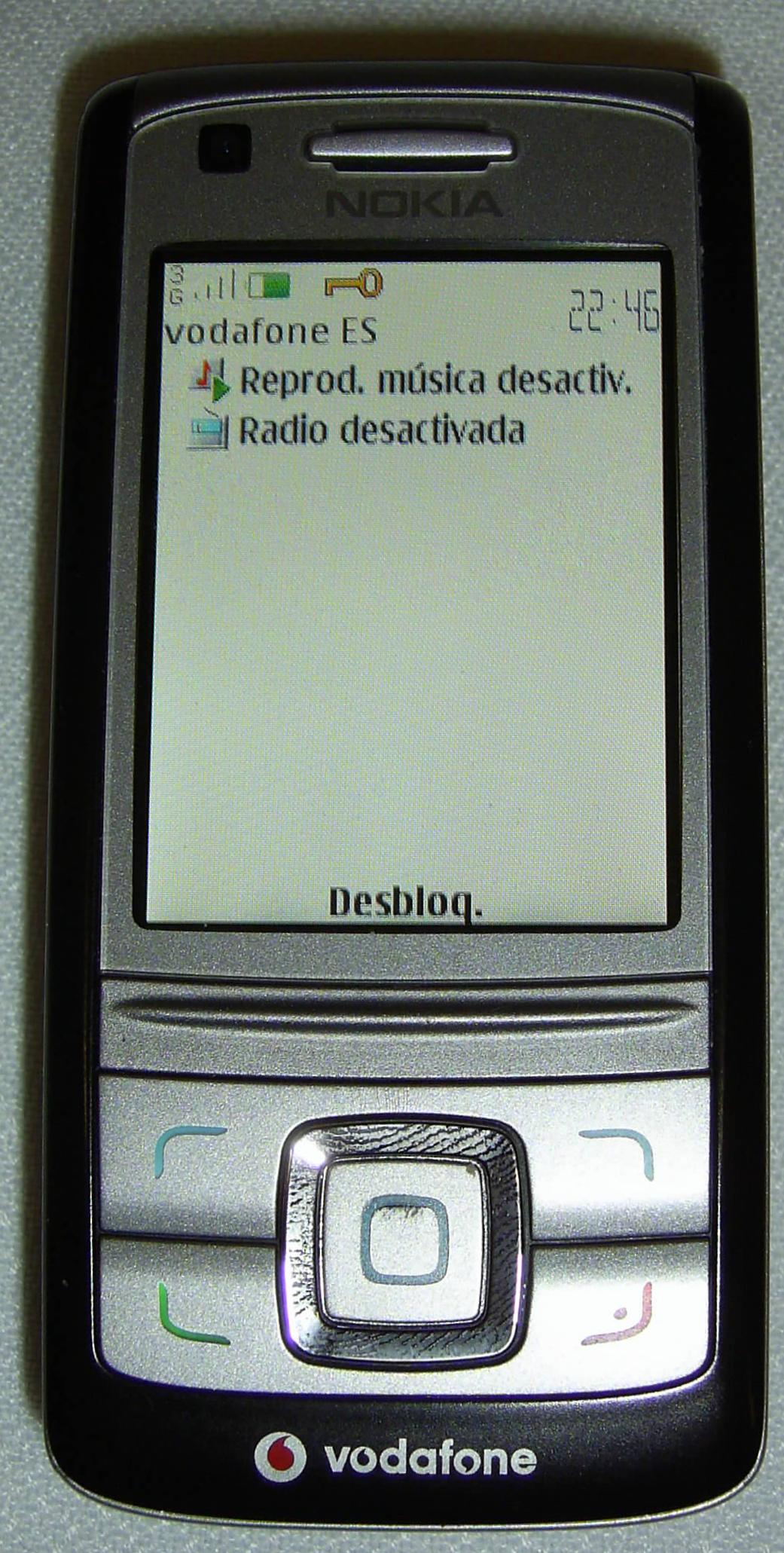
- Brand: 3, Vodafone, O2 UK, T-mobile UK
- Manufacturer: Nokia
- Availability by region: June 2005 (3), August 2005 (Vodafone), October 2005 (O2 UK)
- Predecessor: N/A
- Successor: Nokia 6110 Navigator; Nokia 6260 slide Nokia N80
- Related: Nokia 6111; Nokia 6270
- Compatible networks: GSM 900/1800/1900 and WCDMA 2100
- Form factor: slider
- Dimensions: 100×46×21 mm (3.94×1.81×0.83 in), 91 cc
- Weight: 115 g (4 oz)
- CPU: ARM9 229Mhz
- Memory: 6 MB
- Removable storage: 64 MB bundled miniSD card
- Battery: 3.7V 970 mAh (model BP-6M)
- Rear camera: 2-megapixel
- Front camera: VGA camera (only for video calling)
- Display: 240 × 320 (QVGA) 262k colour TFT 35 × 45 mm
- Media: MP3/AAC/eACC+/M4A formats, as well as MIDI/polyphonic tones
- Connectivity: Bluetooth, Infrared, USB

The Nokia 6280 Series, is a series of slider type phones first released in May 2005.

== Nokia 6280 ==
The Nokia 6280 is a 3G mobile phone from Nokia. Announced in June 2005. It is the 3G sister product to the 2G Nokia 6270. It features two cameras, a rear two megapixel camera with an 8× digital zoom and flash, and a front-mounted VGA camera for video calling only. It also has expandable memory via miniSD memory cards. The 6280 uses the Nokia Series 40 mobile platform and can be network locked using the base band 5 locking mechanism. It is available in four colours: Black, Plum, Burnt Orange and Silver.

The phone is slightly smaller than its 2G relative, at 100 × 46 × 21 mm in size and 115 g in weight.

=== Video ===
The 6280 can play back MPEG 4 ".mp4" video files, such as those designed to be played on an iPod, provided they have not been encrypted under DRM. AVI files can be transcoded using software on the PC. During video playback, the audio track tends to stop after about 20 minutes. To get around this problem it is possible to split mp4 files into several pieces, but in software version 6.x or later the problem does not occur. The default format used by the phone for video encoding is ".3GP", which QuickTime will decode. This is the format used by the phone when video is selected from the camera option.

There are many free programs that can convert the video files from and to the phone, such as FFmpeg or Nokia PC Suite's Multimedia Player.

=== Firmware update ===
Many firmware updates have been released for the Nokia 6280 that fix many of the issues related to the original firmware. The original firmware has been known to drop out and crash without warning. There is also an issue related to the silent profile on the phone. The new firmware has fixed some of these issues as well as adding more complete ID3 functionality for the music player and stereo bluetooth capability. The newer firmware versions are similar to those of the Nokia 6288. Although the options to update the phone over the air OTA or by data cable are available in the phone, the phone can not be updated by either of these options. This is because of v3 firmware models, when using the PC software update (when the 6280 was listed) ended up being 'bricked' due to certain coding not being written into the phone. However, a later version of the phone is technically capable of it, however, the 6280 has been removed from the software update program. Software updates can be completed by taking the phone to a licensed Nokia repair centre (such as Carphone Warehouse in the UK). These can be done for free under warranty (even if the phone isn't faulty), but can be done out-of-warranty at a cost. The latest firmware version available from Carphone Warehouse UK is 6.43, however, higher versions may exist from Nokia directly.

=== Specifications ===
Operating System	Nokia S40 3rd Edition
System Speed	Normal Applications : 220 MHz
Video recording	128x96, 176x144, 352x288 & 640x480. 3GP Format running at 13 Frames Per Second
Talk time	5 Hours
Standby time	8+ days (200 hours)

== Nokia 6288 ==
Nokia 6288
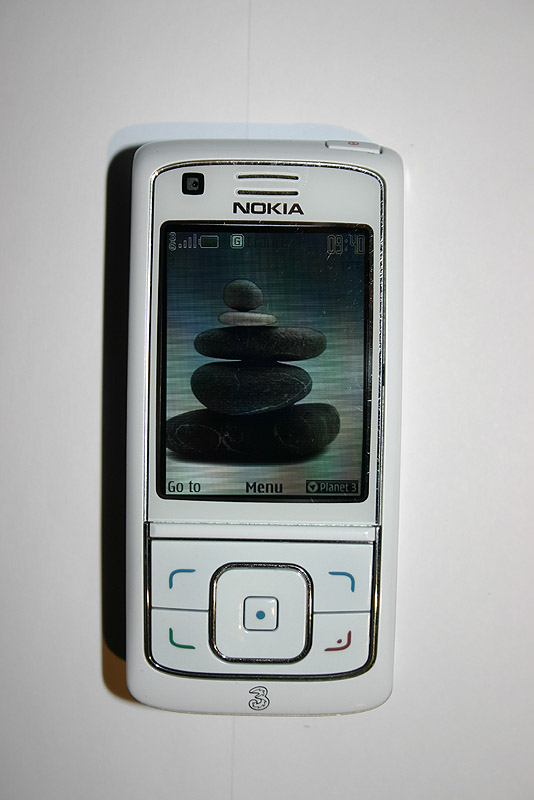
- Brand: 3, Vodafone, O2 UK, T-mobile UK
- Manufacturer: Nokia
- Availability by region: UK 21 September 2006
- Predecessor: N/A
- Successor: Nokia 6600 slide
- Compatible networks: GSM 900/1800/1900 and WCDMA 2100
- Form factor: slider
- Dimensions: 100×46×21 mm (3.94×1.81×0.83 in), 91 cc
- CPU: ARM9 229Mhz
- Memory: 6 MB
- Removable storage: Up to 2GB
- Rear camera: 2-megapixel
- Front camera: VGA camera (only for video calling)
- Display: 240 × 320 (QVGA) 262k colour TFT 35 × 45 mm
- Media: MP3/AAC/eACC+/M4A formats, as well as MIDI/polyphonic tones
- Connectivity: Bluetooth, Infrared, USB

The Nokia 6288 is a 3G mobile phone made by Nokia. It is an updated version of the Nokia 6280. The mobile phone is a slide design phone, featuring a 2.2 inch (320x240 pixels), 262,144 color TFT screen, and two cameras: one at the rear being a 2 MP camera (complete with 8× digital zoom and flash) and a front camera for video calling only. The phone can record .3gp video in 640x480 resolution, while it can play back both 3GP and MP4 videos. It has 6 MB of built-in memory and the option to expand up to 2 GB via the use of a miniSD card. The 6288 is able to be used on TriBand GSM (900/1800/1900 MHz) and WCDMA (2100 MHz). It also features PTT support, IM and email clients. The phone has Bluetooth 2 (with A2DP/AVRCP profile support), infrared and USB connections. The Phone comes in two colours, Black and White. The phone also has Java built into it and supports most generic java applications as well as specific S40 version applications.

=== Images ===
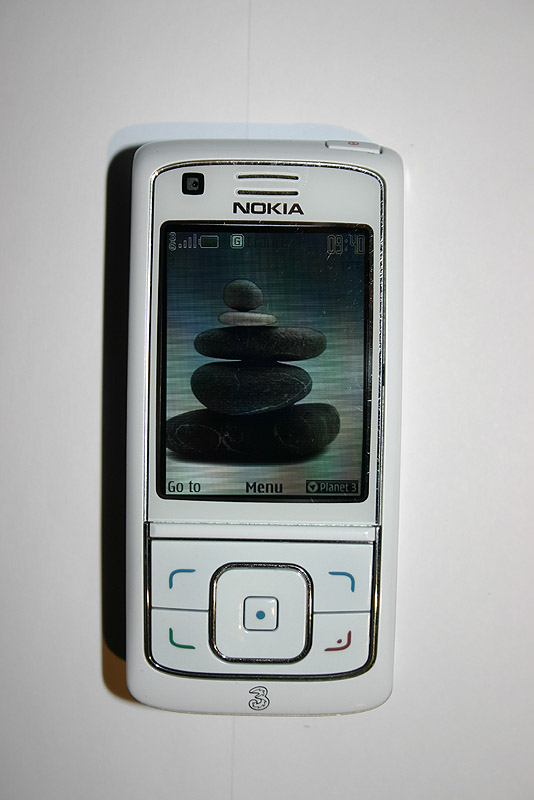
Nokia 6288 (White) in the closed position

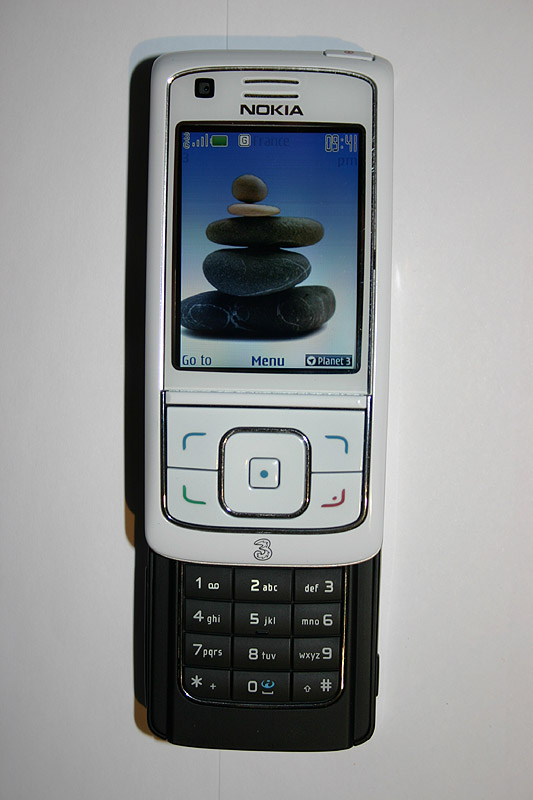
Nokia 6288 (White) in the open position

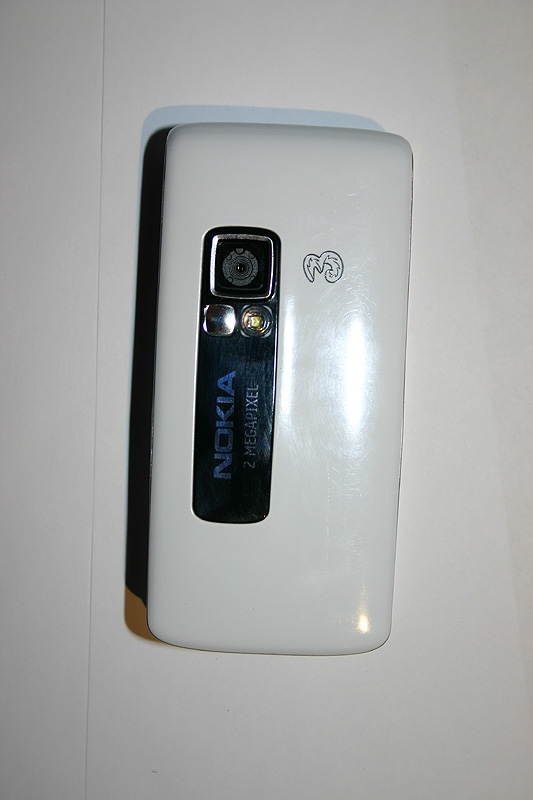
Nokia 6288 (White) back

=== Specifications ===
Network	GSM 900/1800/1900
Dimensions	100 × 46 × 21 mm, 91 cc
Display	240 × 320 pixels, 262,144 colors, TFT
Ring	MP3/Realtone
Vibration	Yes
Memory	6 MB internal, up to 2 GB via miniSD
GPRS	Class 10
Bluetooth	Yes, v 2.0
Infrared	Yes
USB	Yes
Camera	2 Megapixels (with flash)

== Variants ==
Nokia 6282 (RM-79)

The official North American variant, released in late 2005. It featured different cellular network bands (850/1800/1900 MHz) to work on US carriers.
