= Nokia 6210 Navigator =

Cell phone model

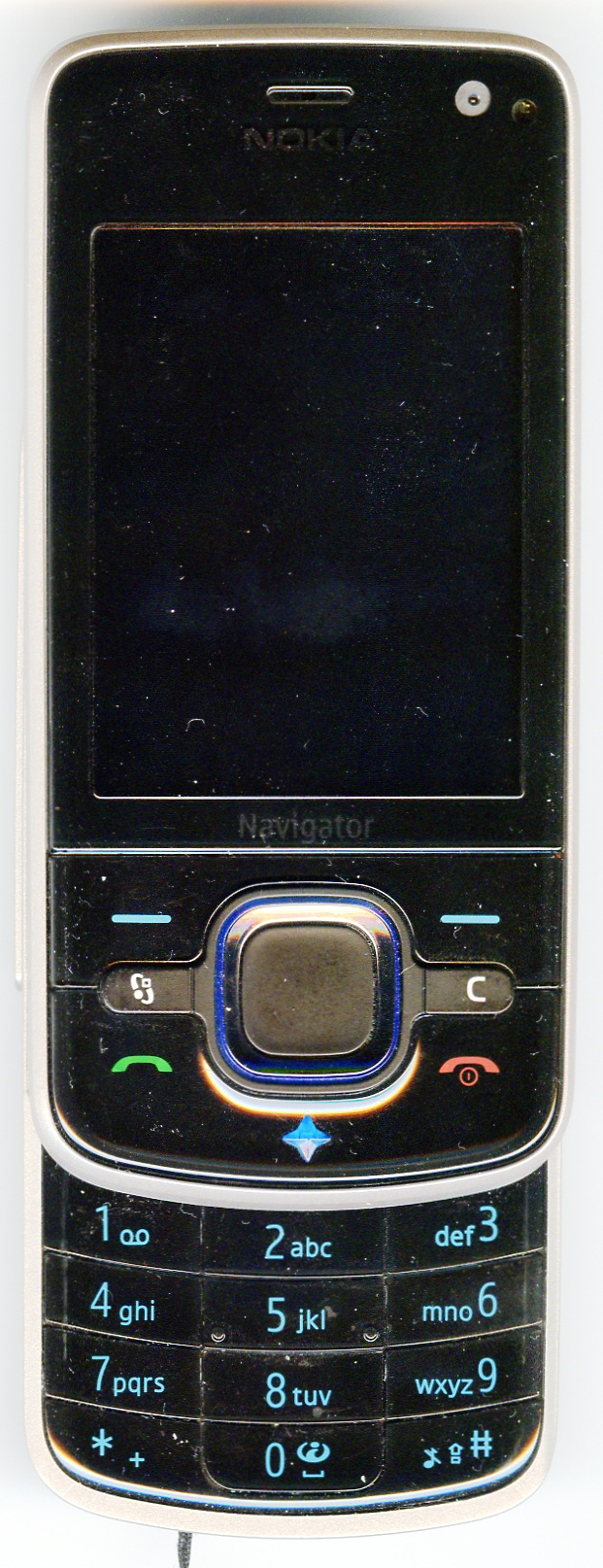
- Manufacturer: Nokia
- Predecessor: Nokia 6110 Navigator
- Successor: Nokia 6710 Navigator
- Related: Nokia 6220 Classic; Nokia 6260 slide Nokia 6600 slide Nokia E66; Nokia N78
- Compatible networks: EGSM 850/900/1800/1900 HSDPA 900/2100
- Form factor: Slider
- Dimensions: 103×49×14.9 mm (4.06×1.93×0.59 in)
- Weight: 117 g (4 oz) (0.258 lb)
- Operating system: Symbian OS v9.3, S60 3rd Edition, Feature Pack 2
- CPU: ARM11 369 MHz
- Memory: 111 MB (internal) + MicroSD Memory Card (1 GB Included)
- Rear camera: 3.2 Megapixels (Back)
- Front camera: CIF video call (Front)
- Display: 2.4 inches, 240 × 320 pixels, TFT LCD
- Connectivity: USB Mass Storage via micro USB, Bluetooth 2.0

The Nokia 6210 Navigator is a mobile phone made by Nokia that is a successor to Nokia 6110 Navigator. It was announced on February 11, 2008 and had been available from July 2008. It runs on Symbian OS v9.3 with a S60 3rd Edition FP2 user interface.

The Nokia 6210 Navigator is the third phone in the Navigator series to be released by Nokia. The Nokia 6210 Navigator includes pre-loaded navigation maps with a free navigation license for 6 months. It is also the company's first device with a built-in magnetic compass.

It was succeeded by the Nokia 6710 Navigator.

== Accelerometer ==
The 6210 Navigator includes a built-in accelerometer. This was originally only used for video stabilization and photo orientation (to keep landscape or portrait shots oriented as taken).

Nokia Research Center has allowed an application interface directly to the accelerometer, allowing software to use the data from it. Nokia has released an application to demonstrate this.

Third-party programs have been created, including software that will automatically change the screen orientation when the phone is tilted, programs that simulate the sounds of a Star Wars lightsaber when the phone is waved through the air, allow you to mute the phone by turning it face-down, and many more.

== Technical specifications ==
- Symbian OS v9.3 with S60 Platform 3rd Edition, Feature Pack 2
- Quad band GSM / GPRS / EDGE: GSM/EDGE Quadband 850/900/1800/1900 MHz
- Dual band UMTS / HSDPA: W-CDMA 900/2100 MHz
- HSDPA 3.6 Mbit/s
- Integrated GPS system
- A-GPS
- Digital Compass
- 96 MB RAM
- 3.2 megapixel camera, Video – VGA 640×480
- QCIF camera for video calling
- Bluetooth 2.0 with EDR & A2DP
- USB 2.0 (micro USB)
- microSD
- Stereo FM radio and support for Visual Radio
- Push to Talk over Cellular (PoC)
- Music Player supporting MP3, AAC, eAAC+, WMA files
- Mono speaker

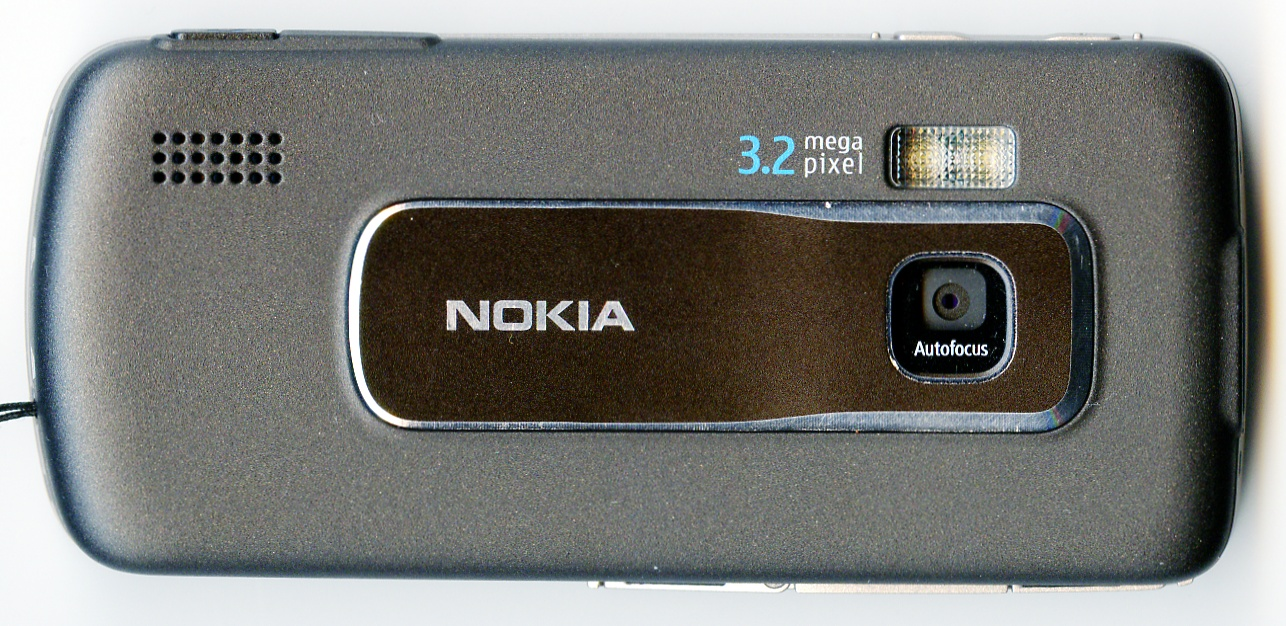
The back of the 6210 Navigator, showing the 3.2 megapixel camera

Users can determine the software version in the phone by pressing *#0000# on the keypad.

== See also ==
- List of Nokia products
