= Nokia 6110 Navigator =

Cell phone model

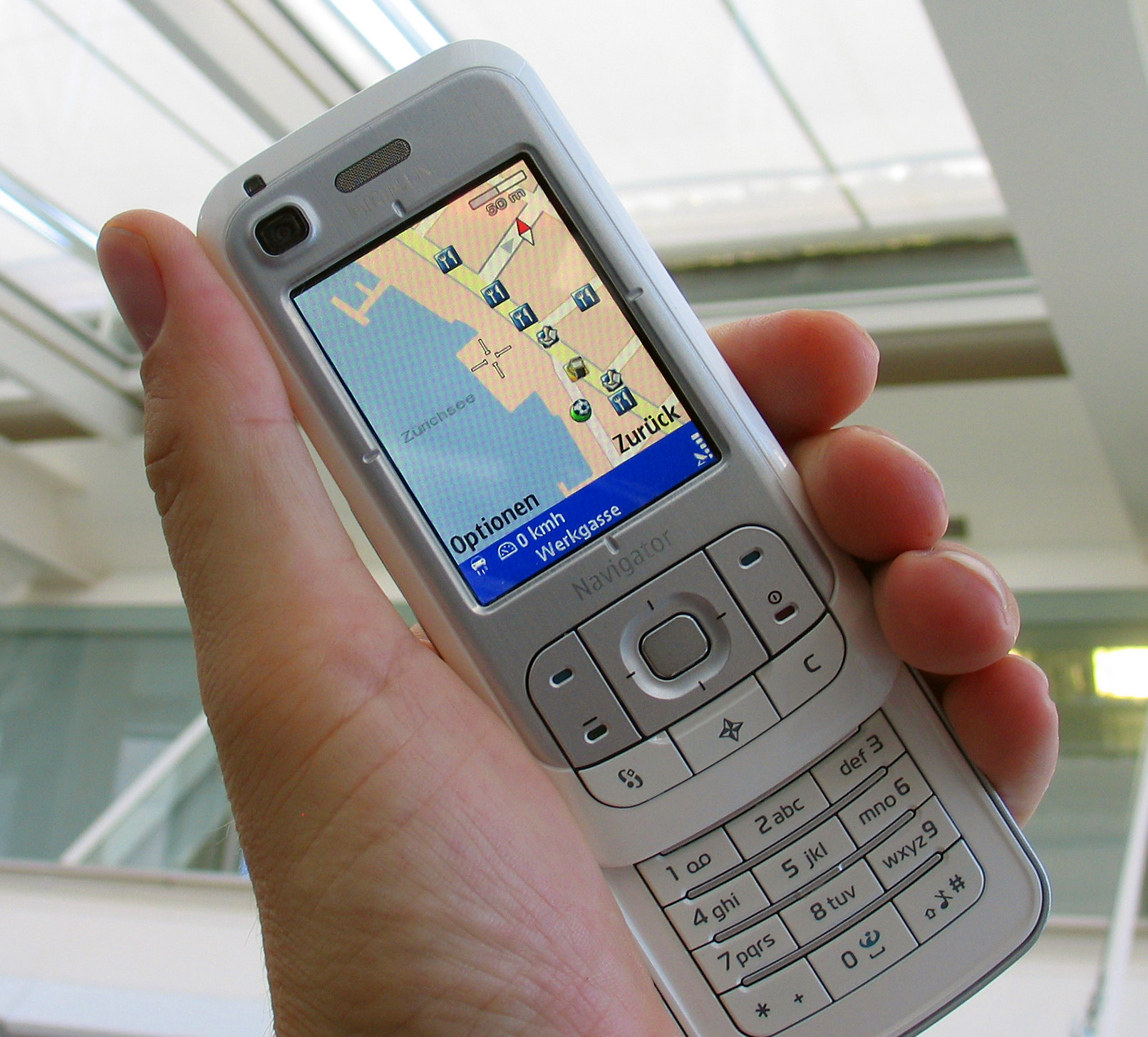
- Predecessor: Nokia 6280 Series
- Successor: Nokia 6210 Navigator
- Compatible networks: EGSM 850/900/1800/1900 WCDMA/HSDPA 2100
- Dimensions: 101×49×20 mm (3.98×1.93×0.79 in)
- Weight: 125 g (4 oz) (0.276 lb)
- CPU: ARM11 @ 369 Mhz
- Memory: 35 MB (internal) + MicroSD Memory Card (Included - with 512MB storage space)
- Display: 2.2 inches, 320 × 240 pixels, TFT, 16 true million colors, QVGA
- Connectivity: USB Mass Storage via mini USB, Bluetooth 2.0

The Nokia 6110 Navigator is a mobile phone made by Nokia, announced on 12 February 2007. It has been available since June 2007. It runs on Symbian OS v9.2 with a S60 3rd Edition FP1 user interface. It is not to be confused with the 1997/98 Nokia 6110. The Nokia 6110 Navigator includes pre-loaded navigation maps.

The Nokia 6210 Navigator succeeded the 6110 Navigator.

In February 2008, Vodafone recalled 3,000 of their branded Nokia 6110 Navigators due to problems with its GPS application.

== Features ==
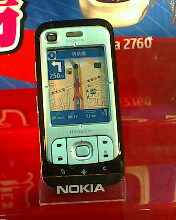
A 6110 Navigator on display

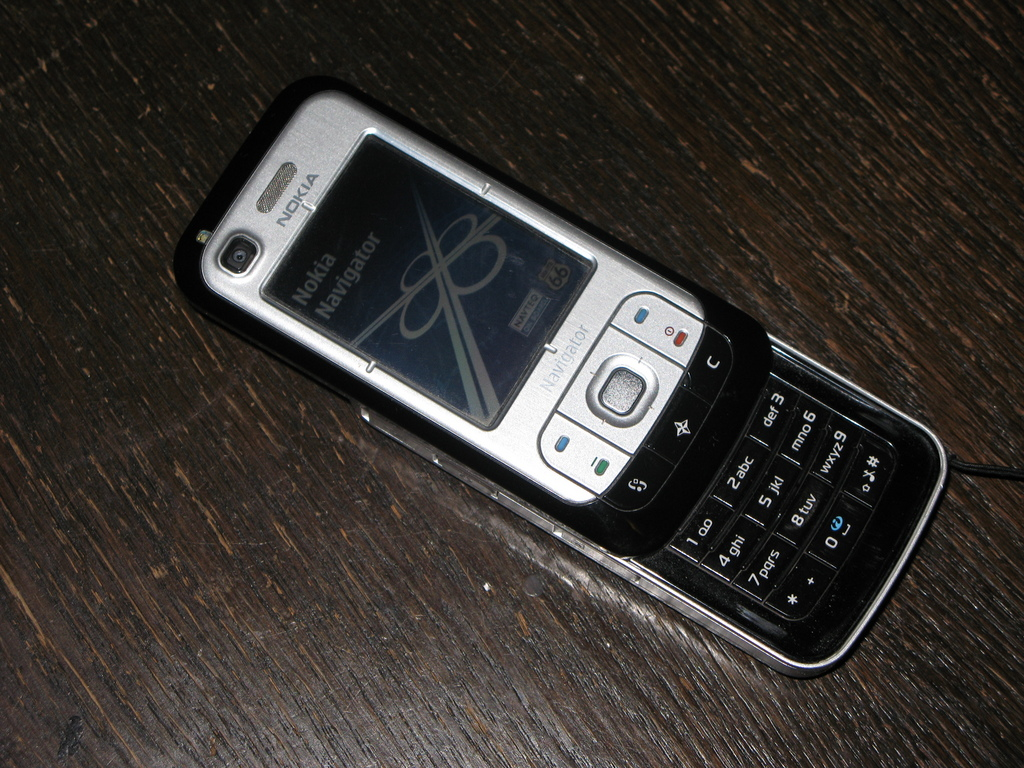
Booting up Route 66

It packs many features with HSDPA and integrated GPS and Bluetooth. It was the second Nokia phone with GPS, after the Nokia N95 and before the Nokia 6210 Navigator and Nokia 6710 Navigator (in order).

== Technical specifications ==
- Symbian OS v9.2 with S60 Platform 3rd Edition, Feature Pack 1
- Quad band GSM / GPRS / EDGE: GSM/EDGE Quadband 850/900/1800/1900 MHz
- Singleband UMTS / HSDPA: W-CDMA 2100 MHz
- HSDPA 3.6 Mbit/s
- Integrated GPS system
- A-GPS
- 2 megapixel camera, Video – CIF 352×288
- QCIF camera for video calling
- Bluetooth 2.0
- USB 2.0 (mini USB)
- microSD
- Stereo FM radio and support for Visual Radio
- Push to Talk over Cellular (PoC)
- Music Player supporting MP3, AAC, eAAC+, WMA, WAV, MIDI files
- Stereo speakers
- Standby Up to 265 h (2G) / 264 h (3G)
- Talk time Up to 3 h 30 min (2G) / 3 h 30 min (3G)

== Updating software and maps ==
World maps can be purchased from Nokia through its website, though they are generally not the latest release from NAVTEQ/ROUTE66. These can be downloaded to the user's PC using Nokia Map Loader (requires Microsoft .NET Framework) or simply double clicking on the downloaded .SIS file with the phone connected to Nokia PC Suite by the data cable, and finishing the installation on the phone. The whole process takes approximately 15 minutes. The maps are installed to the data card and appear in the maps section as World Maps. Installing the maps does not affect the GPS Voice Navigation if this service is already being provided by the sim card provider. If the text, Street not Digitised Appears, the user can just zoom to current GPS location to enhance map magnification.

NAVTEQ's website provides users with a Map Reporter function where users can report missing streets, missing features, restriction, points of interest, errors in the spelling of street names for the Nokia 6110 Navigator. Users are encouraged to report variations in the interests of improving navigation.

== See also ==
- List of Nokia products
