= Nokia 6270 =

Mobile phone

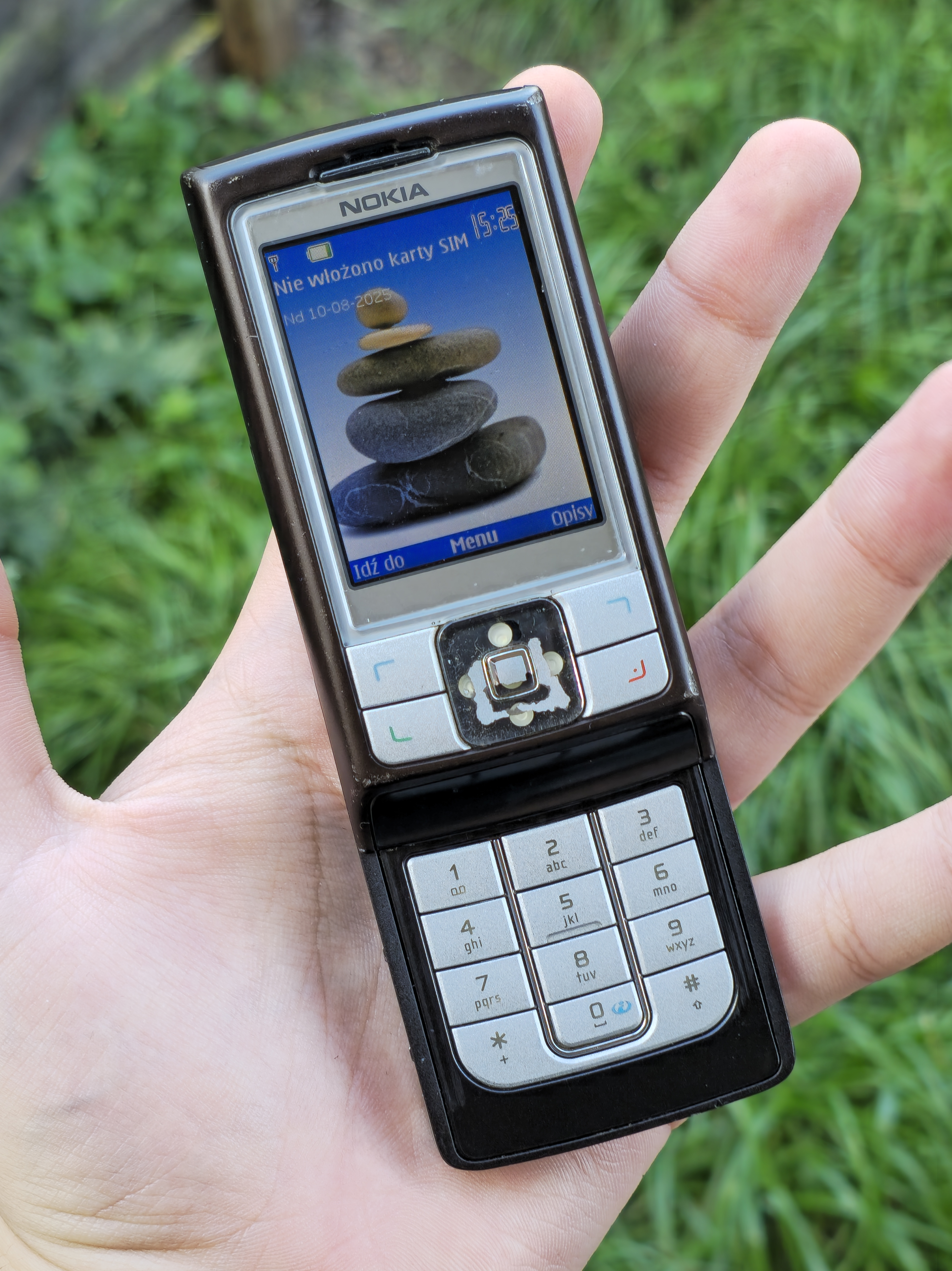
- Damaged Nokia 6270
- Brand: Nokia
- Developer: Nokia
- Manufacturer: Nokia Corporation
- Type: Smartphone
- Series: 6000 series
- First released: 2005, June
- Discontinued: Yes
- Predecessor: Nokia 6230
- Successor: Nokia 6288
- Compatible networks: GSM
- Form factor: Bar
- Colors: Light Blue, Dark Brown
- Dimensions: 104 mm (4.1 in) H 50 mm (2.0 in) W 23 mm (0.91 in) D
- Weight: 125 g (4.4 oz)
- Operating system: Series 40
- Memory: 9 MB (5 MB user available)
- Removable storage: miniSD, 128 MB included
- SIM: Mini-SIM
- Battery: Removable Li-Ion 970 mAh battery (BL-5C)
- Rear camera: 2 MP with LED flash, QCIF video recording
- Front camera: None
- Display: 2.2 inches, TFT, 256K colors, 240 x 320 pixels (~182 ppi)
- Sound: Loudspeaker with stereo speakers; Vibration; Downloadable polyphonic and MP3 ringtones; No 3.5mm jack
- Connectivity: Bluetooth 2.0; Infrared port; USB Pop-Port; No WLAN
- Data inputs: 4-way navigation key; Predictive text input
- Development status: Discontinued
- Other: Stereo FM radio; SMS, MMS, Email, Instant Messaging; Organizer; Voice dial; Games (3D snake + downloadable); Java MIDP 2.0

The Nokia 6270 is a 2005 quad band mobile phone from Nokia. It is based on the Series 40 third generation platform, and features a 2 megapixel digital camera with 5x digital zoom and a flash, 9 MB of storage plus support for up to a 2 GB miniSD card, and a 240x320 QVGA screen with 262,144 colors. Software includes a full XHTML compatible web browser, an email client and a media player (mp3 and mp4 supported).

The phone has a good connectivity as it features Bluetooth, EDGE, Pop-Port and infrared and is also USB compatible for synchronising with your home PC.

Along with the music player with MP3 and AAC support, it also has a built-in radio receiver, which is used through the headset supplied. The phone features stereo speakers with 3D sound effects, a new technology which makes the sound more realistic and is now embedded in many of the latest high-class phones.

It also has active standby, which displays daily activities and meetings on the phone's idle display.

Next in the phone line is the Nokia 6280, a 3G version of the Nokia 6270. It was succeeded by the Nokia E65 and the Nokia 6500 slide which were released in 2007.
