= Nokia 6600 slide =

Mobile phone model

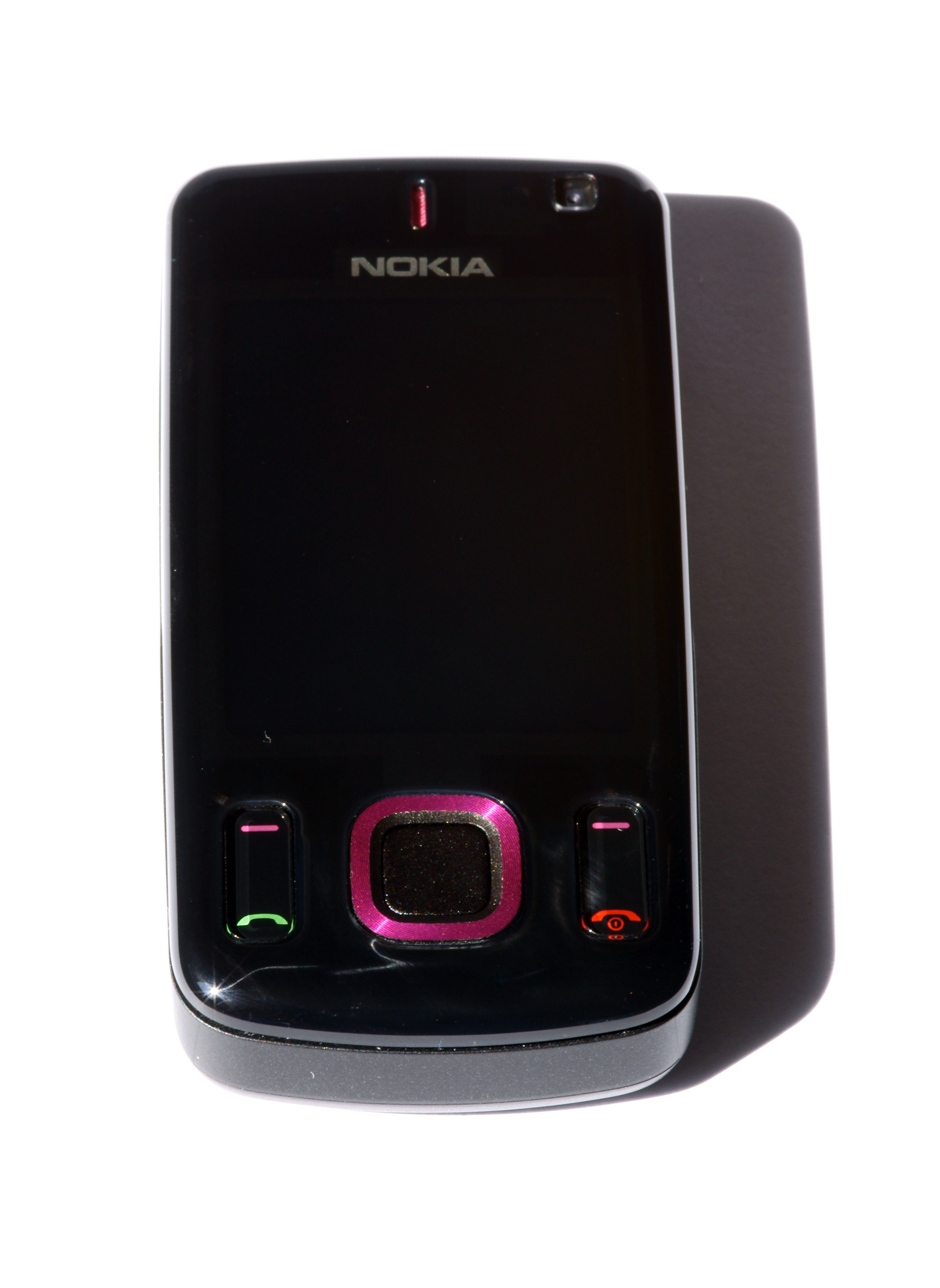
- Manufacturer: Nokia
- Availability by region: August 2008
- Discontinued: c. Q2 2011
- Predecessor: Nokia 6288
- Successor: Nokia C5-00
- Related: Nokia 3600 slide Nokia 6210 Navigator; Nokia 6220 Classic; Nokia 6260 slide Nokia 6600 fold
- Compatible networks: UMTS 850/2100 GSM 850/900/1800/1900
- Form factor: Slide
- Dimensions: 90×45×14 mm (3.54×1.77×0.55 in)
- Weight: 110 g (4 oz)
- Operating system: Series 40
- Memory: 20 MB internal
- Battery: BL-4U 1000 mAh
- Rear camera: 3.2 megapixels
- Front camera: VGA camera (only for video calling)
- Display: 2.2 inch QVGA LCD (16.7 million colors)
- Connectivity: Bluetooth 2.0, Micro-USB

The Nokia 6600 slide is a mobile phone series by Nokia. It includes the original 6600 slide (released April 2008) and the updated 6600i slide (released May 2009). The phone runs the Series 40 5th edition platform, including Feature Pack 1. This is the slide version of updated Nokia 6600 series.

== Common features ==
- Browsing
  - xHTML browser over wTCP/IP stack supports WAP release 2.0
  - WML (WAP 2.0) browser
- Communications
  - Quad band GSM / GPRS / EDGE: GSM 850, GSM 900, GSM 1800, GSM 1900
  - Dual band UMTS: UMTS 850, UMTS 2100
- Developer Platform
  - Series 40 5th Edition, Feature Pack 1
- Display
  - 2.2" (240x320 pixels) QVGA display supporting up to 16.7 million colors
- Media
  - Music player supports MP3, MP4, AAC, eAAC+ & WMA audio formats
  - Video playback supports H.263, H.264, MPEG4, and 3GPP formats and codecs
  - Video streaming supports 3GPP and H.263 formats
  - FM Radio
  - Double LED flash
  - Video Recording supports VGA at 15fps, and QVGA at 30fps
- Connectivity
  - Micro USB 2.0 supporting USB On-The-Go
  - Remote SyncML data synchronisation via Bluetooth

== Specific features ==
=== Nokia 6600 ===
- Camera
  - 3.2-megapixel (2048x1536 resolution) camera, with 8x digital zoom
  - second camera
- Dimensions
  - 90 x 45 x 14mm
- Memory
  - 20 MB internal memory expandable to 4 GB using microSD card
- Power Management
  - BL-4U Battery
  - Up to 4 hours talk time on GSM, and 3 hours on WCDMA
  - Up to 10 days standby time
  - 1000 mAh

=== Nokia 6600i ===
- Camera
  - 5-megapixel (2592x1944 resolution) camera, with 8x digital zoom
  - second camera
- Dimensions
  - 90 x 45 x 14.2mm
- Memory
  - 20 MB internal memory expandable to 16 GB using microSD card
- Power Management
  - BL-4U Battery
  - Up to 4 hours talk time on GSM, and 3 hours on WCDMA
  - Up to 12 days standby time
  - 1000 mAh

== Related handsets ==
- Nokia 3600 slide
- Nokia 6500 slide
- Nokia 6600 fold
