= Nokia E66 =

Mobile phone model

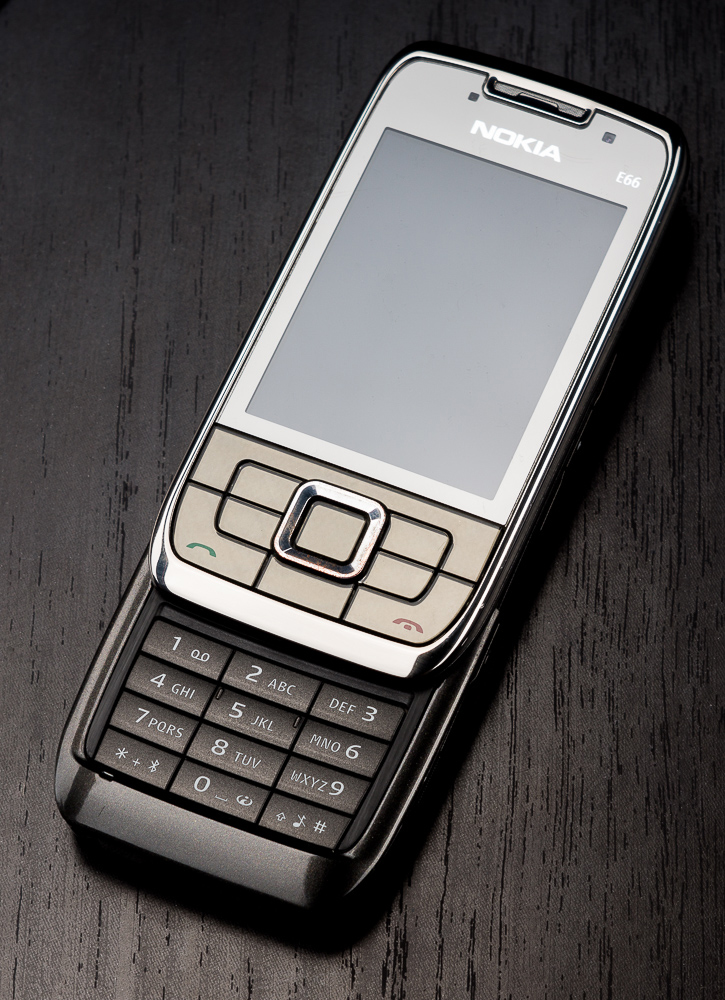
- Manufacturer: Nokia
- Availability by region: June 2008
- Discontinued: Q1 2010
- Predecessor: Nokia E65
- Successor: Nokia C6-01; Nokia C7-00
- Related: Nokia E51; Nokia E63; Nokia E71
- Compatible networks: Quad band GSM / GPRS / EDGE: GSM 850 / 900 / 1800 / 1900; Dual band UMTS / HSDPA
- Form factor: slider
- Dimensions: 107.5 × 49.5 × 13.6 mm, Volume: 62.6 cm^{3} (3.82 cu in)
- Weight: 121 g (4 oz) (0.267 lb)
- Operating system: S60 v3.1 (3rd Edition, Feature Pack 1) UI on Symbian OS v9.2
- CPU: 369 MHz ARM11 Freescale processor
- Memory: 110 MB Internal user storage ROM: 256 MB; SDRAM: 128 MB; ~71 MB Free Executable RAM
- Removable storage: 8 GB max MicroSDHC Hot-swappable
- Battery: BL-4U, 3.7 V 1000 mAh lithium-polymer
- Rear camera: 3.2-megapixel, 2048 × 1536 pixel, autofocus, video (QVGA, 150 frames/second), flash
- Front camera: video call camera
- Display: 2.4 in TFT QVGA (240×320 pixel), 166 ppi, 16.8 million colors
- Connectivity: WLAN Wi-Fi 802.11 b,g, Integrated & Assisted GPS, Bluetooth 2.0, Infrared and microUSB
- Data inputs: Numeric keyboard, five-way joystick
- Other: FOTA (Firmware update Over The Air) This handset does not support FOTA as of firmware v 510.21.009

The Nokia E66 is a slider mobile phone in the Nokia Eseries range, a S60 platform third edition device with slide action targeting business users. It is a successor to the Nokia E65 with which it shares many features.

E66 has similar features to the Nokia E71 handset, but lacks sufficient battery capacity for all day use and does not have the full QWERTY, however the E66 is smaller in size and weighs less. The E66 also includes an accelerometer and new animations and transition effects, which are lacking in the E71.

== Features ==
- Quad band GSM / GPRS / EDGE: GSM 850 / 900 / 1800 / 1900
- Dual band UMTS / HSDPA: UMTS 900 / 2100
- FM radio 87.5–108 MHz with Visual Radio
- 3.2-megapixel camera (2048 × 1536 pixels) with Self-portrait mirror, autofocus and LED flash
- 110 MB Internal user storage, support up to 8 GB MicroSDHC memory card
- Video: 320 × 240 (QVGA) at 15 frames/s, 176 × 144 at 15 frames/s (QCIF)
- Front-facing camera for video call
- 2.36 inch QVGA (320 × 240) screen
- Modes: Define user preset standby screens for different times of the day
- Accelerometer and Light sensor
- OS: S60 3rd Edition, Feature Pack 1 (Version 3.1), with Symbian OS Version 9.2
- In-Box Colours: grey steel, white steel, black steel and red steel

The 2.5 mm (3/32 in) audio port is not suitable for traditional 3.5 mm (1/8 in) headphones plugs.

The microUSB port cannot be used to charge the mobile.

== Operating times ==
- Talk time: Up to 3.4 hours (3G), 7.5 hours (GSM)
- Standby time: Up to 14 days (3G), 11 days (GSM)

== Firmware history ==
Dial *#0000# to Check firmware version

- 100.07.81/100.07.76: Build date 16-06-2008 (Default firmware upon release)
- 100.07.78: Build date 03-07-2008
- 102.07.81: Build date 12-07-2008
- 110.07.126: Build date 03-10-2008
- 200.21.118: Build date 26-11-2008
- 210.21.007: Build date 27-02-2009
- 300.21.012: Build date 18-06-2009
- 400.21.013: Build date 24-10-2009
- 410.21.010: Build date 08-02-2010
- 500.21.009: Build date 02-06-2010
- 501.21.001: Build date 10-08-2010
- 510.21.009: Build date 19-03-2011

== Bundled software ==
- Adobe PDF
- Adv. Call Manager
- Barcode Reader
- Chat and instant messaging
- Dictionary
- Download! (Replaced by Ovi store on later versions)
- Email for Nokia
- File Manager
- Flash Lite 3.0
- Global Race – Raging Thunder
- Internet Radio
- Java MIDP 2.0
- MfE (Mail for Exchange)
- Multiscanner
- Nokia Maps (with 3 months of turn-by-turn navigation mode trial)
- Nokia Search
- Nokia browser
- PDF Viewer
- Quickoffice (Quickword, Quickpoint, Quicksheet)
- Sports Tracker
- WiPresenter
- Wireless Keyboard
- World Mate
- ZIP Manager

== See also ==
- Nokia Eseries
- List of Nokia products
