= Nokia 6600 fold =

Flip mobile phone

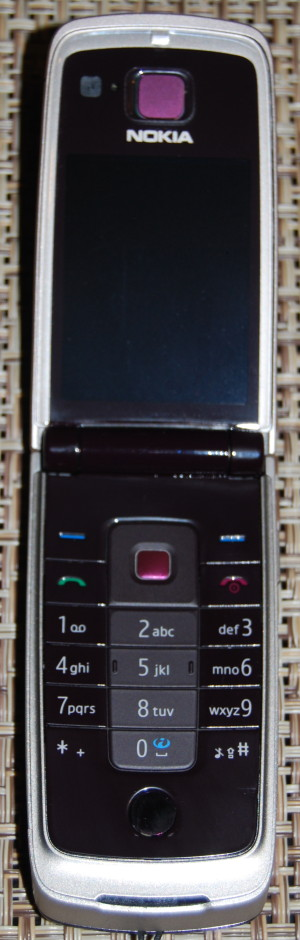
- Manufacturer: Nokia
- Availability by region: May 2008
- Discontinued: Discontinued in early 2011
- Predecessor: Nokia 6086
- Related: Nokia 6600 slide Nokia 6650 fold
- Compatible networks: UMTS 850/2100 GSM 850/900/1800/1900
- Form factor: Clamshell
- Dimensions: 87.7×44.0×15.9 mm (3.45×1.73×0.63 in)
- Weight: 110 g (4 oz)
- Operating system: Series 40
- Memory: 15 MB internal
- Battery: BL-4CT 860 mAh
- Rear camera: 2 megapixels
- Display: 2.13 inch QVGA LCD (16.7 million colors)
- Connectivity: Bluetooth 2.0, Micro-USB, EDGE class 32

The Nokia 6600 fold is a clamshell-style fashion oriented mobile phone made by Nokia, and announced on 28 April 2008. The phone runs the Series 40 5th Edition platform and supports 3G networks.

The phone has an external OLED display that brings up a clock and other information by double tapping, as also seen on Nokia 8800 Arte. Similarly to the Nokia 6131/6126, it has a flip opener mechanism with the key on the right hand side of the device.

The Nokia 6600 fold has a "sleek", metal construction with external mirror. It was sold in three color variants: blue, black (Mysterious Black) and purple (Sophisticated Purple). The Nokia 6600 slide shares the same design language but in a slider form.
