= Nokia 6710 Navigator =

Cell phone model

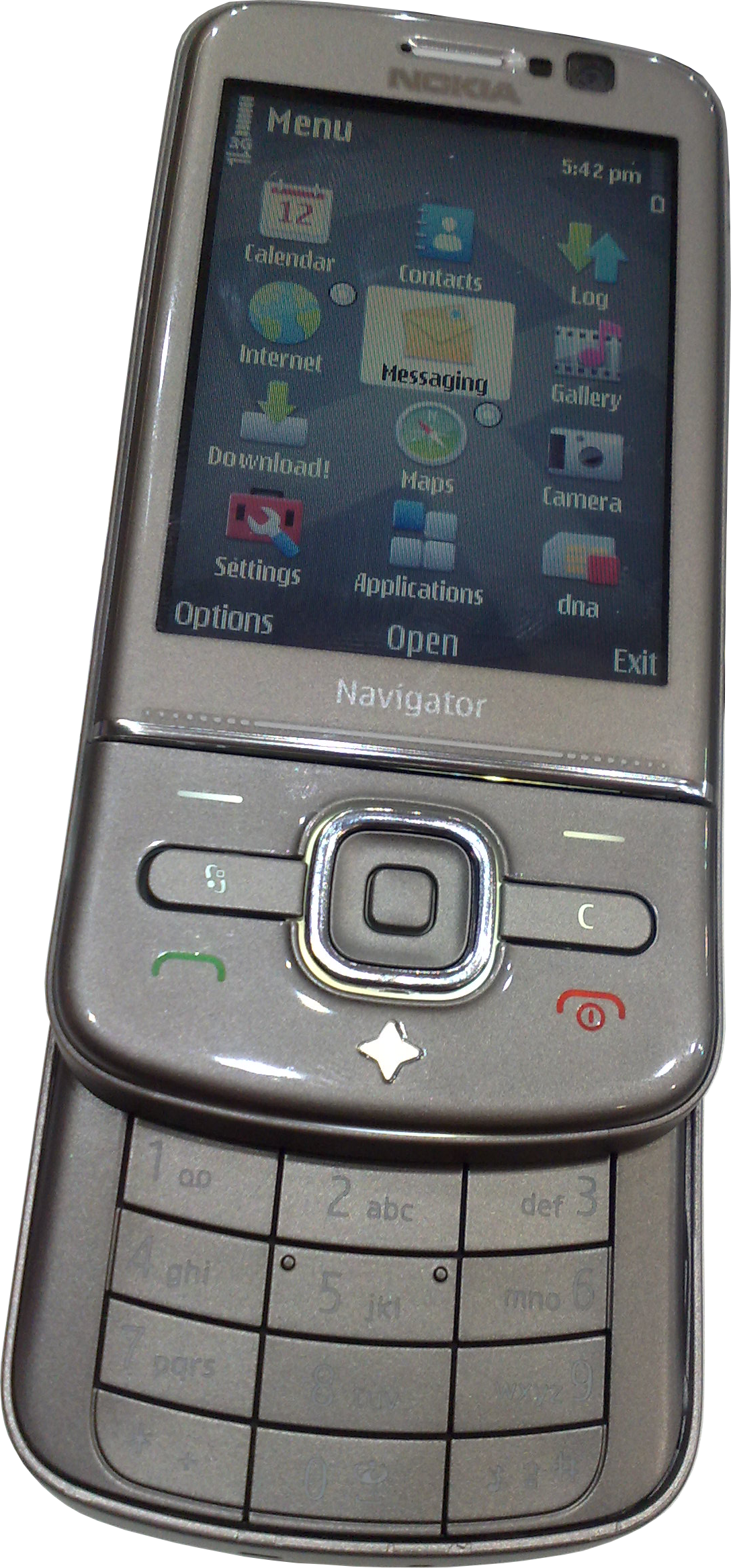
- Manufacturer: Nokia
- Predecessor: Nokia 6210 Navigator
- Compatible networks: EGSM 850/900/1800/1900 HSDPA 900/1900/2100
- Form factor: Slider
- Dimensions: 104.8×50.1×14.9 mm (4.13×1.97×0.59 in)
- Weight: 117 g (4 oz) (0.258 lb)
- Operating system: Symbian OS v9.3, S60 3rd Edition, Feature Pack 2
- CPU: ARM11 600 MHz
- Memory: 50 MB (internal) + MicroSD Memory Card (4 GB Included)
- Rear camera: 5.0 Megapixels
- Front camera: QVGA video call (Front)
- Display: 2.6 inches, 240 × 320 pixels, TFT LCD
- Connectivity: USB Mass Storage via micro USB, Bluetooth 2.0

The Nokia 6710 Navigator is a mobile phone made by Nokia, announced on 16 February 2009. that is a successor to Nokia 6210 Navigator. It was released in August 2009. The Nokia 6710 Navigator is the fourth device in the Navigator series to be released by Nokia. The Nokia 6710 Navigator includes pre-loaded navigation maps with a lifetime free navigation license.

It runs on Symbian 9.3 with a S60 3rd Edition FP2 interface.

Although being a Navigator, it included many high-end features usually seen on other series, such as its 5 megapixel camera, front camera, the 3.5 mm jack and its fast 600 MHz CPU.

== Technical specifications ==
- Symbian OS v9.3 with S60 Platform 3rd Edition, Feature Pack 2
- Quad-band GSM / GPRS / EDGE: GSM/EDGE 850/900/1800/1900 MHz
- Tri band UMTS / HSDPA: W-CDMA 900/1900/2100 MHz
- HSDPA 10.2 Mbit/s
- HSUPA 2.0 Mbit/s
- Integrated GPS system
- A-GPS
- Digital Compass
- 128 MB RAM
- 5.0 megapixel camera, video – VGA 640 × 480
- QVGA camera for video calling
- Bluetooth 2.0 with EDR & A2DP
- USB 2.0 (micro USB)
- microSD
- Stereo FM radio with support for RDS and Visual Radio
- Push to Talk over Cellular (PoC)
- Music Player supporting MP3, AAC, AAC+, eAAC+, WMA, WAV, RealAudio 7, RealAudio 8, RealAudio 10, AMR, MIDI files
- Mono speaker

== See also ==
- List of Nokia products
