= List of best-selling mobile phones =

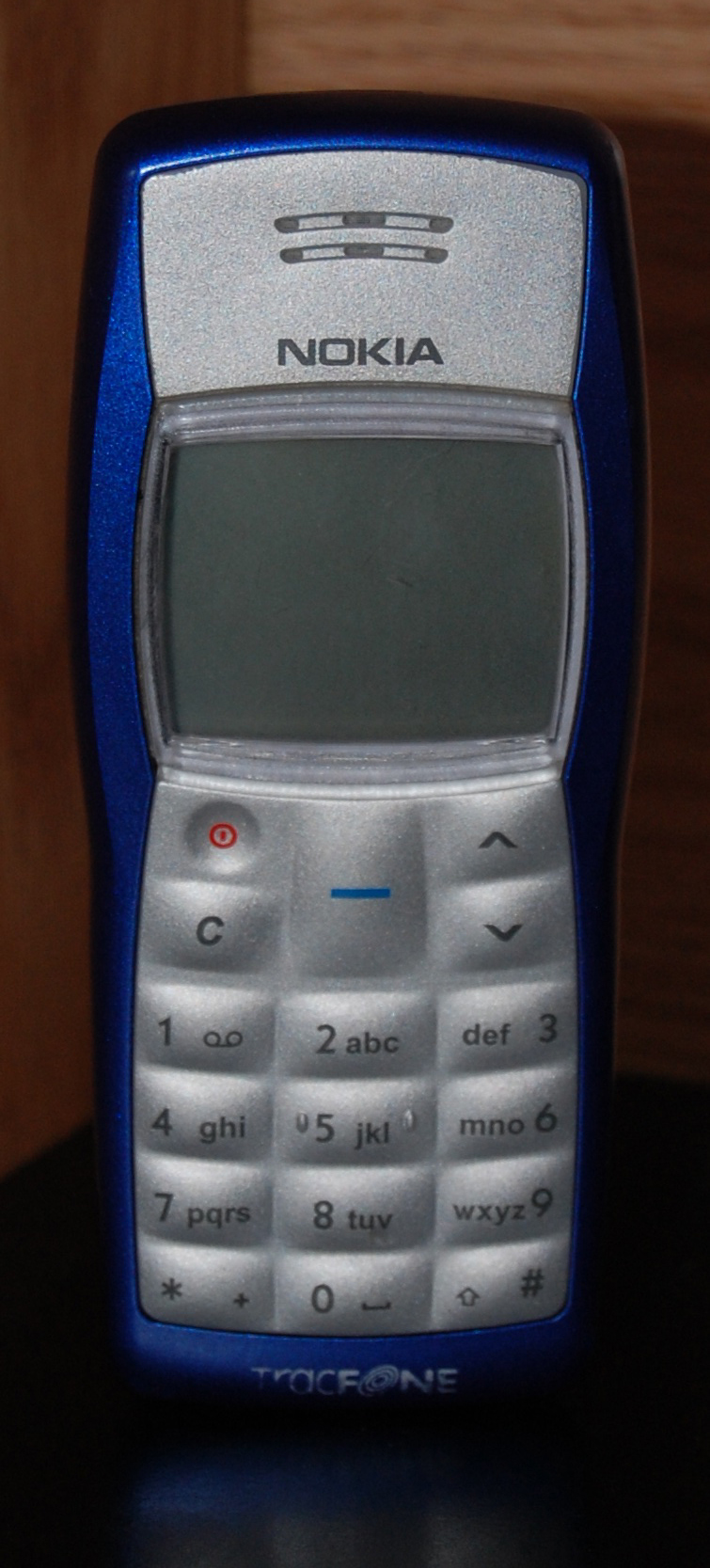
The Nokia 1100 (shown here) and 1110 are the best-selling feature phones.

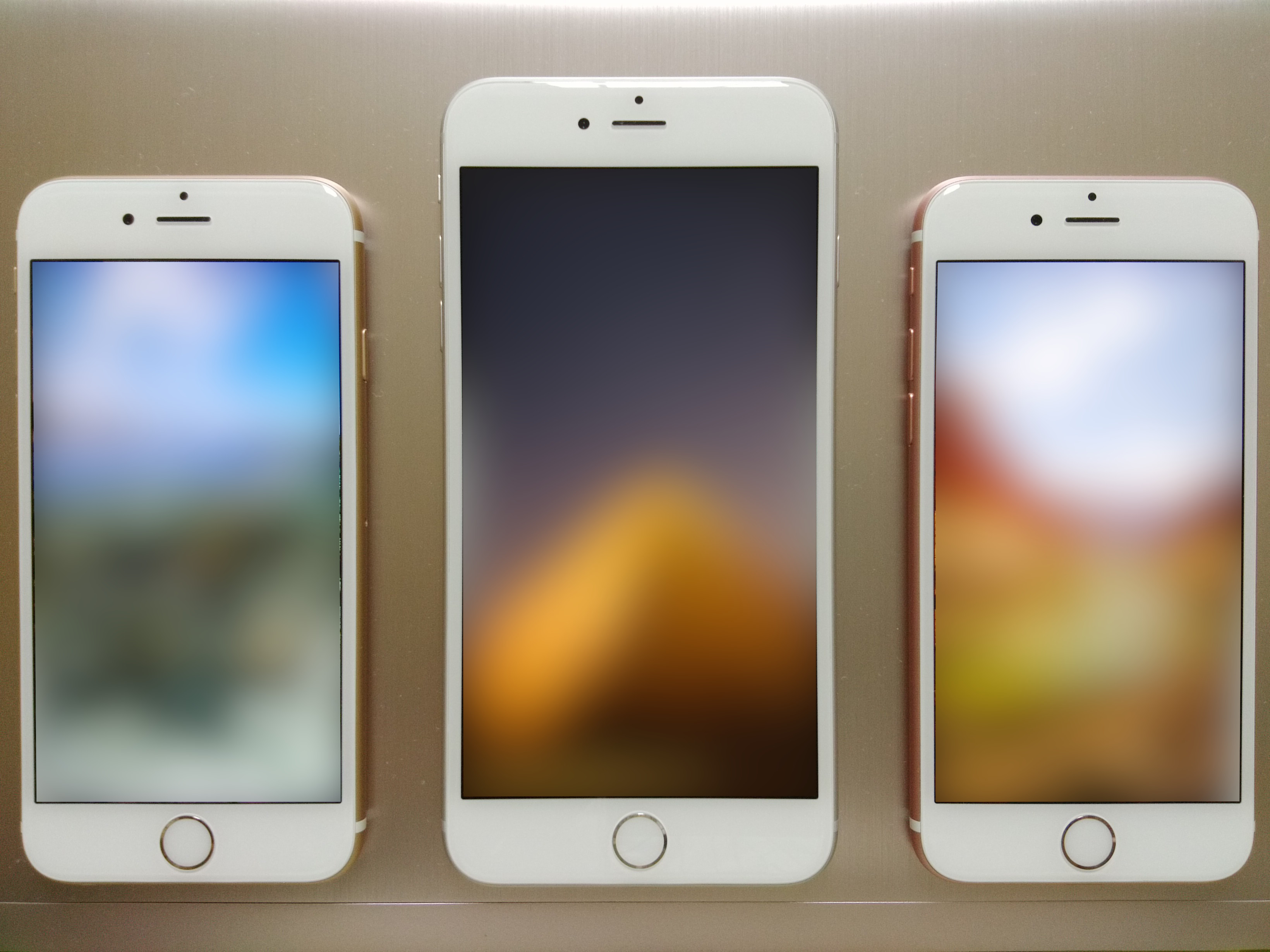
The iPhone 6 and 6 Plus are the best-selling smartphones.

This is a list of best-selling mobile phones. The best-selling mobile devices are the bar phones Nokia 1100 and 1110, released in 2003 and 2005, respectively. Both models have sold over 250 million units. The best-selling touchscreen phones are the iPhone 6 and 6 Plus, both released in 2014. Together, they have sold over 222 million units. The best-selling flip phone is the Motorola Razr V3, released in 2004. It sold over 130 million units. The best-selling slider phone is the Samsung E250, released in 2006. It has sold over 30 million units.

Of the 115 phones on the list, Samsung sold the most models, with 37. Nokia has 27 models, including four of the top 10. Apple has 16 entries on the list, including the six best selling touchscreen phones, which comprise the remainder of the top 10.

Combined, all mobile phones have shipped 26,309,115,000 units worldwide between 1992 and 2020, and 28,900,614,000 units between 1992 and 2022.

== Top-selling mobile phones ==
Manufacturer	Model	Form factor	Smartphone?	Year	Graph (million units)
Nokia	1100	Bar	No	2003	250
Nokia	1110	Bar	No	2005	250
Apple	iPhone 6 and iPhone 6 Plus	Slate	Yes	2014	222.4
Nokia	105 series	Bar	No	2013	200
Apple	iPhone 6S and iPhone 6S Plus	Slate	Yes	2015	173.8
Apple	iPhone 5S	Slate	Yes	2013	163.7
Nokia	3210	Bar	No	1999	160
Apple	iPhone 7 and iPhone 7 Plus	Slate	Yes	2016	156.7
Apple	iPhone 11, iPhone 11 Pro and iPhone 11 Pro Max	Slate	Yes	2019	156
Apple	iPhone XR, iPhone XS and iPhone XS Max	Slate	Yes	2018	150.7
Nokia	6600	Bar	Yes	2003	150
Nokia	1200	Bar	No	2007	150
Nokia	5230	Slate	Yes	2009	150
Samsung	E1100	Bar	No	2009	150
Apple	iPhone 5	Slate	Yes	2012	143.4
Nokia	2600 (2610/2626/2630)	Bar	No	2004	135
Motorola	Razr V3	Flip phone	No	2004	130
Nokia	1600 (1650/1661)	Bar	No	2005	130
Nokia	3310 (3330)	Bar	No	2000	126
Apple	iPhone 8 and iPhone 8 Plus	Slate	Yes	2017	121.7
Apple	iPhone 12, 12 mini, 12 Pro and 12 Pro Max	Slate	Yes	2020	100
Nokia	1208 (1209)	Bar	No	2007	100
Nokia	1280	Bar	No	2010	100
Samsung	Galaxy S4	Slate	Yes	2013	80
Nokia	6010 (6020/6030)	Bar	No	2004	75
Samsung	Galaxy S III and Galaxy S III Mini	Slate	Yes	2012	70
Nokia	5130 (5220/5310)	Bar	No	2007	65
Apple	iPhone X	Slate	Yes	2017	63
Apple	iPhone 4S	Slate	Yes	2011	60
Motorola	StarTAC	Flip phone	No	1996	60
Motorola	C200	Bar	No	2003	60
Motorola	C139	Bar	No	2005	60
Samsung	Galaxy S7 and Galaxy S7 edge	Slate	Yes	2016	55
Nokia	3100 (3120)	Bar	No	2003	50
Nokia	6230 (6233/6234)	Bar	No	2004	50
Apple	iPhone 4	Slate	Yes	2010	50
Nokia	6300	Bar	No	2006	47
Samsung	Galaxy S6 and Galaxy S6 edge	Slate	Yes	2015	45
Nokia	N70 (N72/N73)	Bar	Yes	2005	45
Samsung	Galaxy S8 and Galaxy S8+	Slate	Yes	2017	41
Samsung	Galaxy S II	Slate	Yes	2011	40
Samsung	Galaxy S10, Galaxy S10+ and Galaxy S10e	Slate	Yes	2019	37
Samsung	Galaxy S9 and Galaxy S9+	Slate	Yes	2018	35.4
Nokia	2650	Flip phone	No	2004	35
Apple	iPhone 3GS	Slate	Yes	2009	35
Huawei	P20, P20 Pro and P20 Lite	Slate	Yes	2018	32
Samsung	Galaxy A10	Slate	Yes	2019	30.3
Samsung	E250	Slider	No	2006	30
LG	KP100	Bar	No	2008	30
Samsung	Galaxy Note II	Slate	Yes	2012	30
Nokia	5200 (5300)	Slider	No	2006	30
Xiaomi	Redmi Note 8 and Redmi Note 8 Pro	Slate	Yes	2019	30
Apple	iPhone 12 Pro Max	Slate	Yes	2020	29
Samsung	Galaxy S20, Galaxy S20+ and Galaxy S20 Ultra	Slate	Yes	2020	28
Samsung	Galaxy S	Slate	Yes	2010	25
Samsung	Galaxy Grand Prime Plus	Slate	Yes	2016	24.2
Samsung	Galaxy A50	Slate	Yes	2019	24.2
Apple	iPhone SE (2nd generation)	Slate	Yes	2020	24.2
Samsung	Galaxy A51	Slate	Yes	2019	23.2
Samsung	Galaxy A20	Slate	Yes	2019	23.1
LG	Chocolate	Slider	No	2006	21
Nokia	2110 (2110i/2120/2140/2190)	Bar	No	1994	20
Xiaomi	Redmi Note 7 and Redmi Note 7 Pro	Slate	Yes	2019	20
Huawei	P30 and P30 Pro	Slate	Yes	2019	20
Samsung	Galaxy A21s	Slate	Yes	2020	19.4
Samsung	Galaxy A02	Slate	Yes	2021	18.3
Huawei	Mate 10 and Mate 10 Pro	Slate	Yes	2017	17
Huawei	Mate 20 and Mate 20 Pro	Slate	Yes	2018	17
Samsung	Galaxy A01	Slate	Yes	2019	16.9
HTC	ThunderBolt	Slate	Yes	2011	16
Huawei	Mate 9	Slate	Yes	2016	15.8
Samsung	Galaxy A11	Slate	Yes	2020	15.3
Samsung	Galaxy J2 Core	Slate	Yes	2018	15.2
Nokia	5610 XpressMusic	Slider	No	2007	15
Nokia	5800 XpressMusic	Slate	Yes	2008	15
Nokia	E71 (E72)	Keyboard bar	Yes	2008	15
Sony Ericsson	K300 (K310)	Bar	No	2004	15
Sony Ericsson	K750	Bar	No	2005	15
Sony Ericsson	W800 (W810)	Bar	No	2006	15
Research in Motion (RIM)	BlackBerry Pearl	Bar	Yes	2006	15
Xiaomi	Redmi Note 9 Pro	Slate	Yes	2020	15
Samsung	Galaxy S21, Galaxy S21+ and Galaxy S21 Ultra	Slate	Yes	2021	13.5
Motorola	Droid Bionic	Slate	Yes	2011	13
LG	Cookie (KP500)	Slate	No	2009	13
Huawei	Mate 30 and Mate 30 Pro	Slate	Yes	2019	12
Samsung	Galaxy S22 Ultra	Slate	Yes	2022	10.9
Samsung	SGH-E700	Flip phone	No	2003	10
Nokia	N95	Slider	Yes	2007	10
LG	Shine	Slider	No	2008	10
Samsung	Star/Tocco Lite (S5230)	Slate	No	2009	10
Samsung	Galaxy Note	Slate	Yes	2011	10
Xiaomi	Mi 2	Slate	Yes	2012	10
Samsung	Galaxy Note 3	Slate	Yes	2013	10
LG	G3	Slate	Yes	2014	10
Samsung	Galaxy Note 8	Slate	Yes	2017	10
Xiaomi	Redmi 6A	Slate	Yes	2019	10
Samsung	Galaxy S20 FE	Slate	Yes	2020	10
Oppo	A5 (AX5)	Slate	Yes	2018	9.7
Samsung	Galaxy Note 9	Slate	Yes	2018	9.6
Samsung	Galaxy A30	Slate	Yes	2019	9.2
Xiaomi	Redmi 8A	Slate	Yes	2019	7.3
Oppo	F1 Plus	Slate	Yes	2016	7
Xiaomi	Redmi 8	Slate	Yes	2019	6.8
Samsung	Galaxy J4+	Slate	Yes	2018	6.4
Apple	iPhone	Slate	Yes	2007	6
LG	Viewty (KU990)	Bar	No	2007	5
Samsung	Galaxy J6+	Slate	Yes	2018	4.9
Samsung	Samsung Galaxy S24 Ultra	Slate	Yes	2024	4.9
Samsung	Samsung Galaxy Note 4	Slate	Yes	2014	4.5
Samsung	Samsung Galaxy A14 4G	Slate	Yes	2023	4
Samsung	Galaxy A10s	Slate	Yes	2019	3.9
Samsung	Samsung Galaxy S23 FE	Slate	Yes	2023	3.8
Samsung	Galaxy A30s	Slate	Yes	2019	3.4
Nokia	N-Gage	Taco	Yes	2003	3
LG	G2	Slate	Yes	2013	3
LeTV	LeEco Le 1s	Slate	Yes	2016	3
Samsung	Samsung Galaxy A55	Slate	Yes	2024	2.7
Samsung	Samsung Galaxy S24	Slate	Yes	2024	2.4
Samsung	Samsung Galaxy A15 4G	Slate	Yes	2023	2.2
Google	Pixel and Pixel XL	Slate	Yes	2016	2.1
Palm	Centro	Keyboard bar	Yes	2007	2
Nokia	N97	Tilt slider	Yes	2009	2
Samsung	Samsung Galaxy A05s	Slate	Yes	2023	2

== Annually best-sold handsets ==
Note: The years represent when the phones were released into the market, not the number sold in that particular year. The number sold represents how many units were sold throughout its whole lifetime. The first cell phone was produced by Motorola. Since then there had been produced around 17.37 billion mobile phones as of 2015.

=== 1994 ===
- Nokia 2110 (and variants), 20 million sold

=== 1996 ===
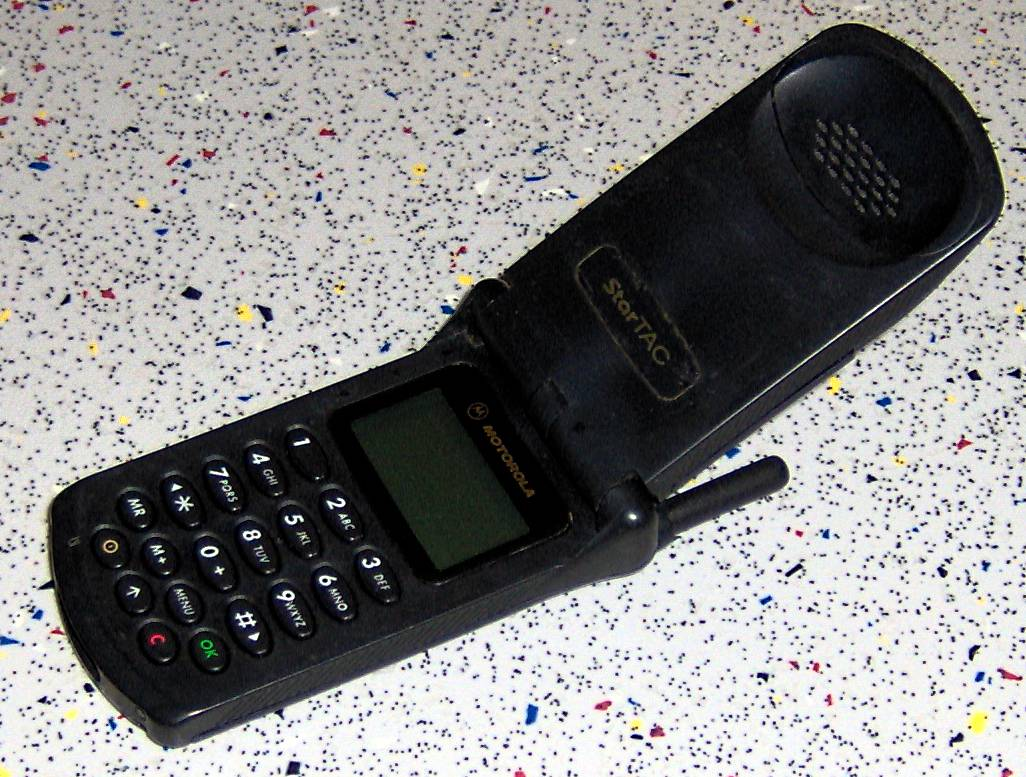
The Motorola StarTAC from 1996 was the first phone to be widely popular.

- Motorola StarTAC, 60 million sold

=== 1999 ===
- Nokia 3210, 160 million sold

=== 2000 ===
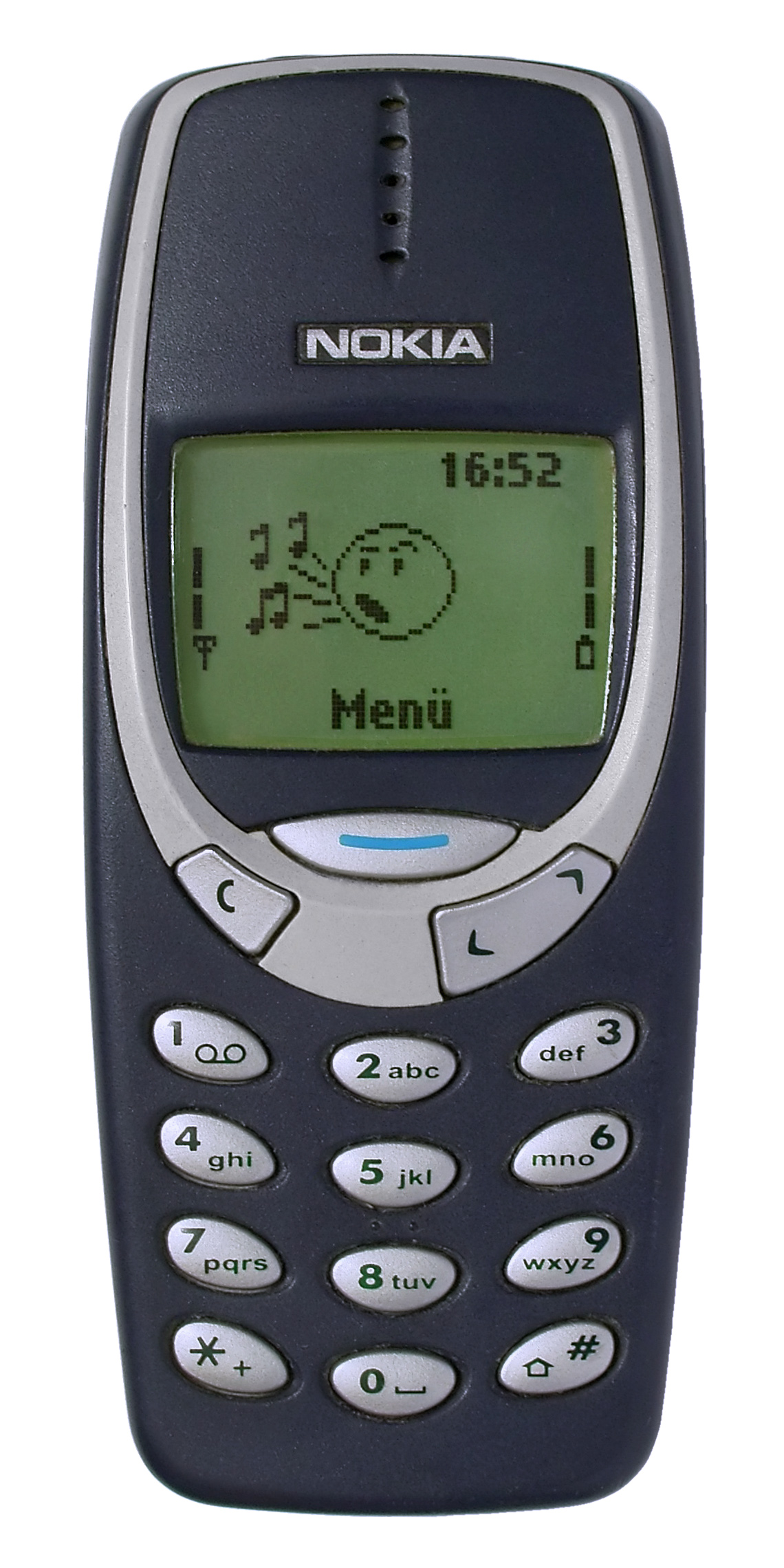
The Nokia 3310 from 2000 sold 126 million units.

- Nokia 3310, 126 million sold
- Nokia 8890, 15 million sold

=== 2002 ===
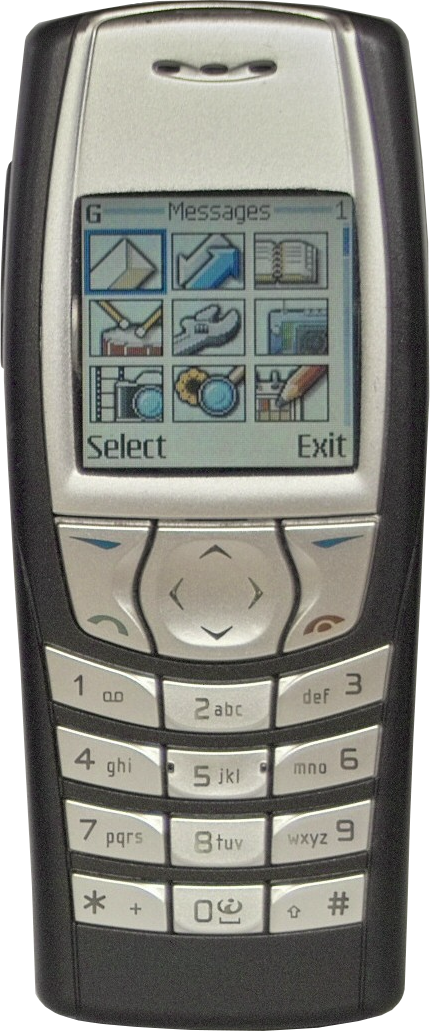
The Nokia 6100 and 6610 (above) from 2002 were the first colour-screen phones to sell over a million.

- Nokia 6100, 15 million sold
- Nokia 6610, 15 million sold
- Nokia 3510, 15 million sold
- Samsung SGH-T100, 12 million sold

=== 2003 ===
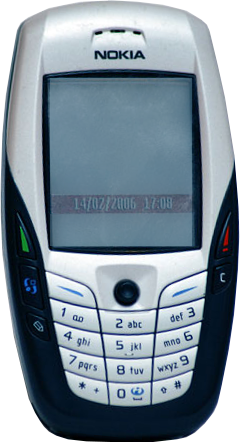
The Nokia 6600 from 2003 was the first camera phone to sell over a million units.

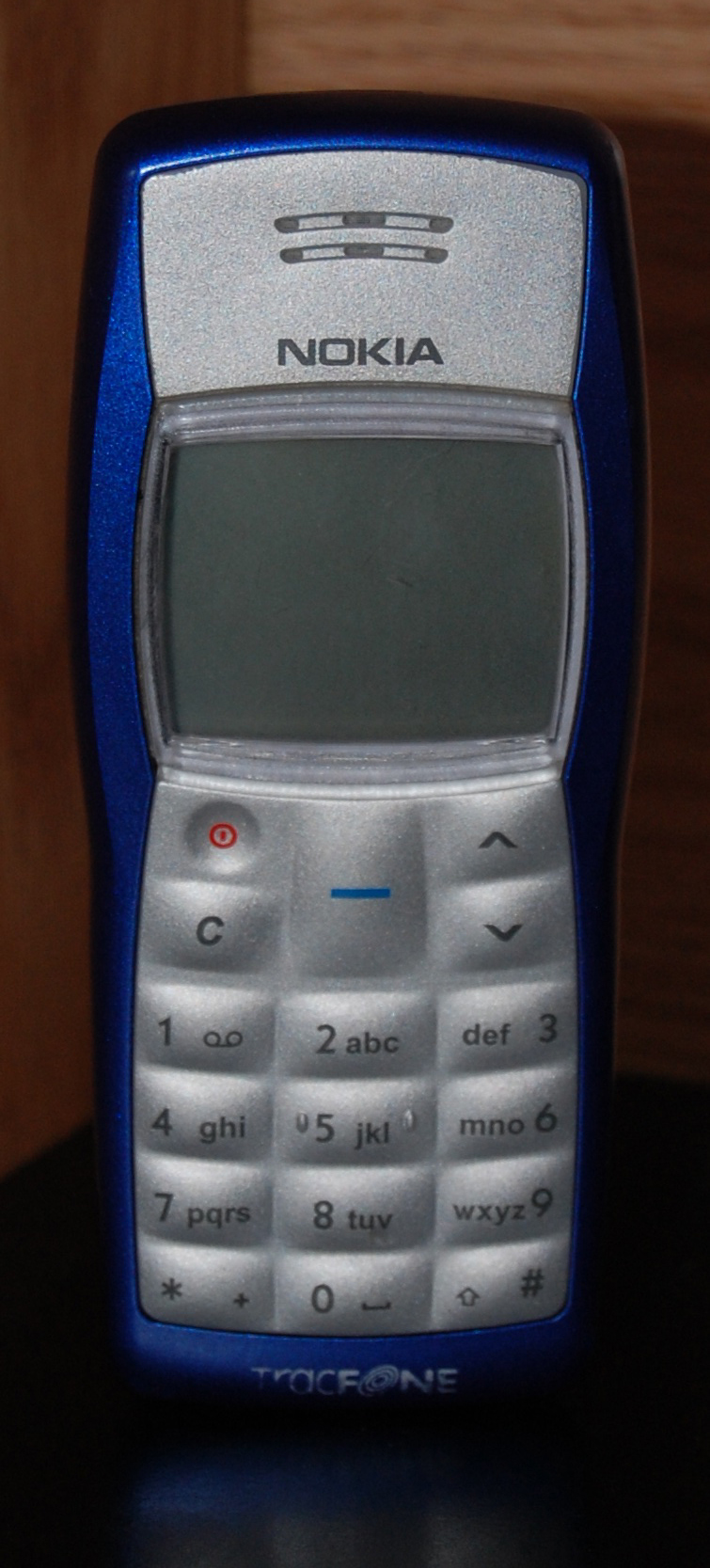
Nokia 1100

- Nokia 1100, 250 million sold
- Nokia 6600, 150 million sold
- Motorola C200, 60 million sold
- Nokia 3100/3120, 50 million sold
- Samsung SGH-E700, 10 million sold
- Nokia N-Gage, 3 million sold

=== 2004 ===
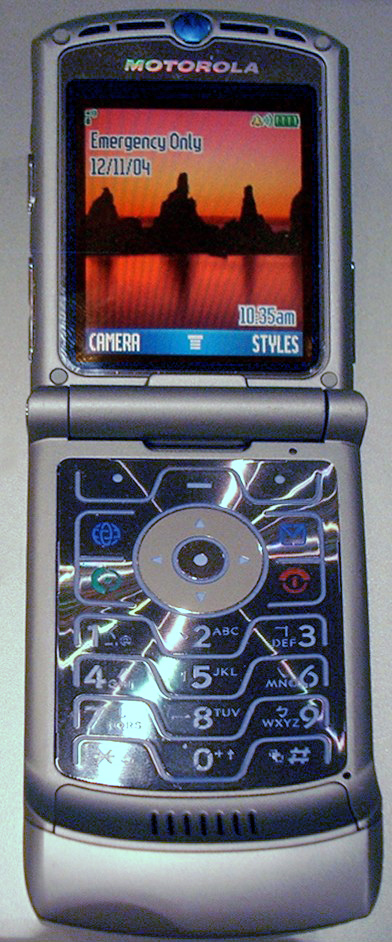
The Motorola Razr V3 was the first flip phone to sell over a million.

- Nokia 2600/2610/2626/2630, 135 million sold
- Motorola Razr V3, 130 million sold
- Nokia 6010/6020/6030, 75 million sold
- Nokia 6230/6233/6234, 47 million sold
- Nokia 2650, 35 million sold
- Sony Ericsson K300/K310, 15 million sold
- Samsung SGH-D500, 12 million sold

=== 2005 ===
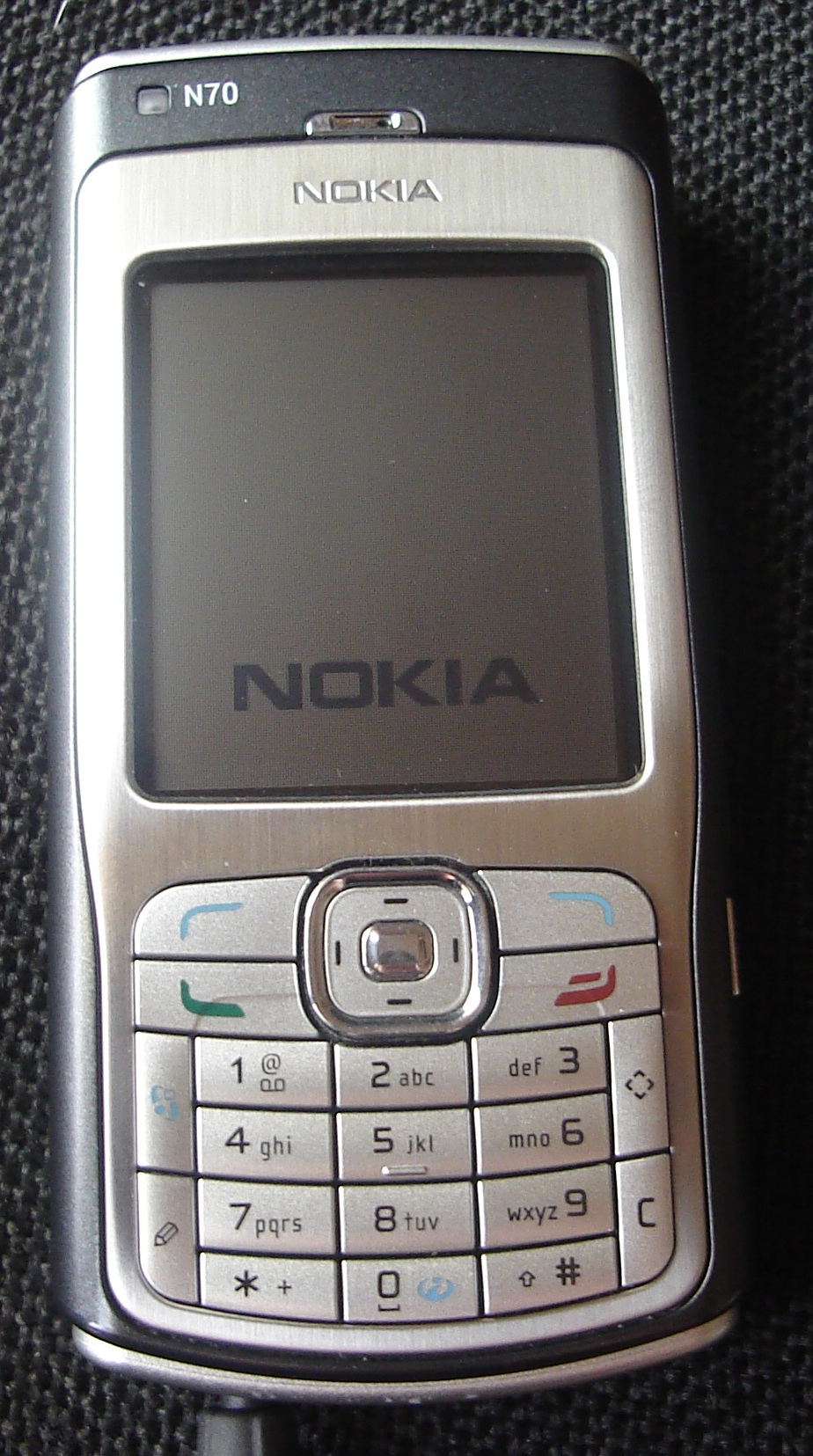
The Nokia N70 was the first smartphone to sell over a million.

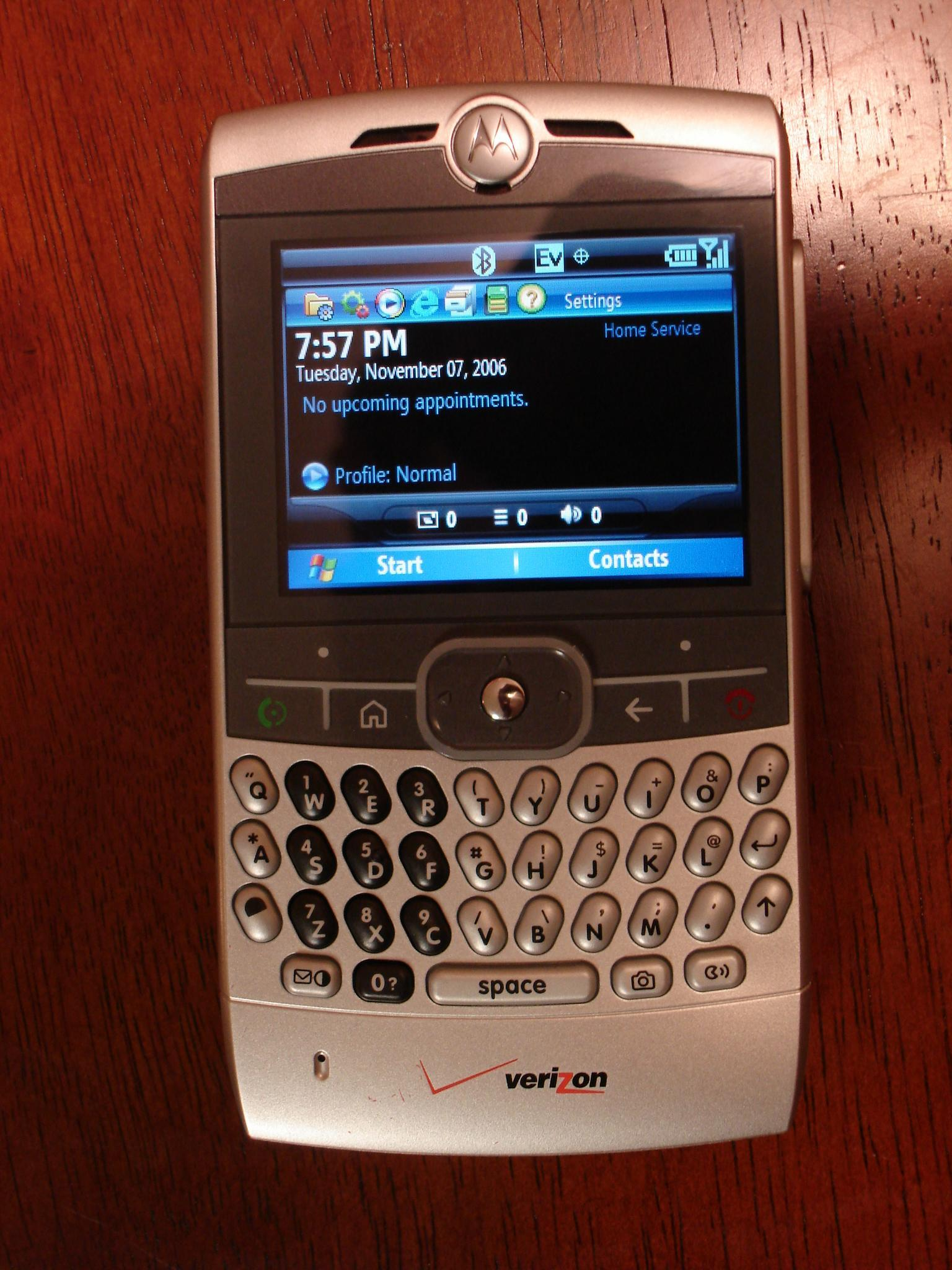
The Motorola Q from 2005 was the first QWERTY phone to sell over a million.

- Nokia 1110, 250 million sold
- Nokia 1600/1650/1661, 130 million sold
- Motorola C139, 60 million sold
- Nokia N70/N72/N73, 45 million sold
- Nokia 6101, 35 million sold
- Nokia 6060, 35 million sold
- Nokia 6270/6280, 30 million sold
- Motorola V220, 15 million sold
- Motorola V195, 15 million sold
- Sony Ericsson K750, 15 million sold
- Nokia 8800, 15 million sold
- Nokia 6111, 15 million sold
- Nokia 2680, 15 million sold
- Motorola Q, 1 million sold

=== 2006 ===
- Nokia 6070/6080, 50 million sold
- Nokia 7360/7370/7380, 45 million sold
- Nokia 6300, 50 million sold
- Nokia 2310, 35 million sold
- Nokia 5200/5300, 30 million sold
- Samsung SGH-E250, 30 million sold
- LG Chocolate KG800, 21 million sold
- BlackBerry Pearl 8100, 15 million sold
- BenQ-Siemens S68/S88, 15 million sold
- Sony Ericsson W800/W810, 15 million sold
- Sony Ericsson W300, 15 million sold
- Samsung SGH-D900, 3 million sold
- Nokia 3250, 1 million sold

=== 2007 ===
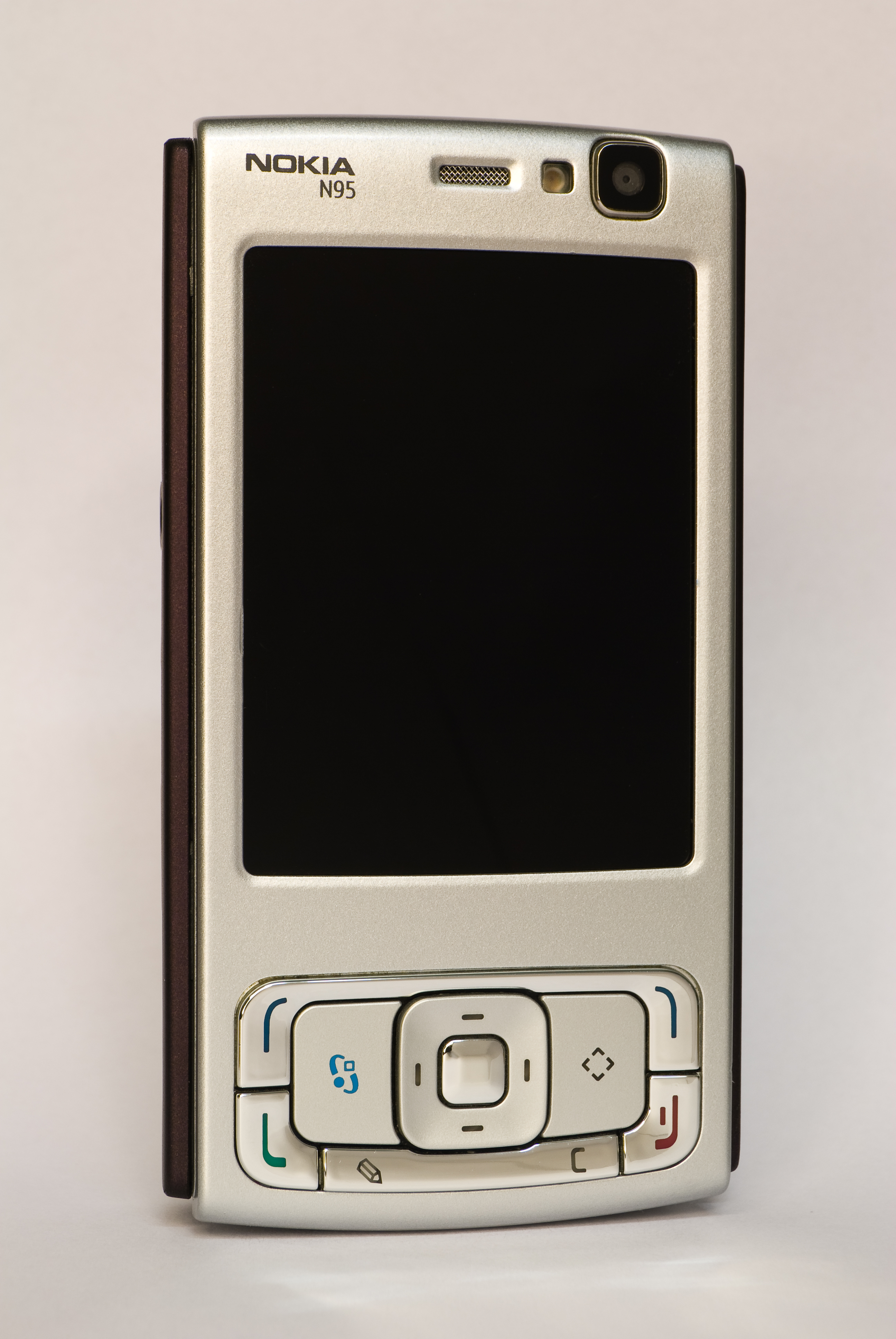
The Nokia N95 was the first non-candybar smartphone to sell over a million.

- Nokia 1200, 150 million sold
- Nokia 1208 (1209), 100 million sold
- Nokia 2600 classic, 15 million sold
- Nokia 3110 classic, 15 million sold
- Nokia 6500 slide, 15 million sold
- Nokia N95, 10 million sold
- Apple iPhone, 6 million sold
- LG Viewty (KU990), 5 million sold
- HTC Touch, 2 million sold
- Palm Centro, 2 million sold

=== 2008 ===
- LG KP100, 30 million sold
- Apple iPhone 3G, 25 million sold
- Nokia 2330 classic, 15 million sold
- Nokia 7210 Supernova, 15 million sold
- Nokia 5800 XpressMusic, 15 million sold
- Nokia 5610 XpressMusic, 15 million sold
- Nokia E71, 15 million sold
- Samsung Tocco (SGH-F480), 12 million sold
- Samsung SGH-J700, 12 million sold
- LG Shine, 10 million sold
- Samsung Tocco TouchWiz (SGH-F480), 5 million sold
- Samsung Soul (SGH-U900), 1 million sold

=== 2009 ===
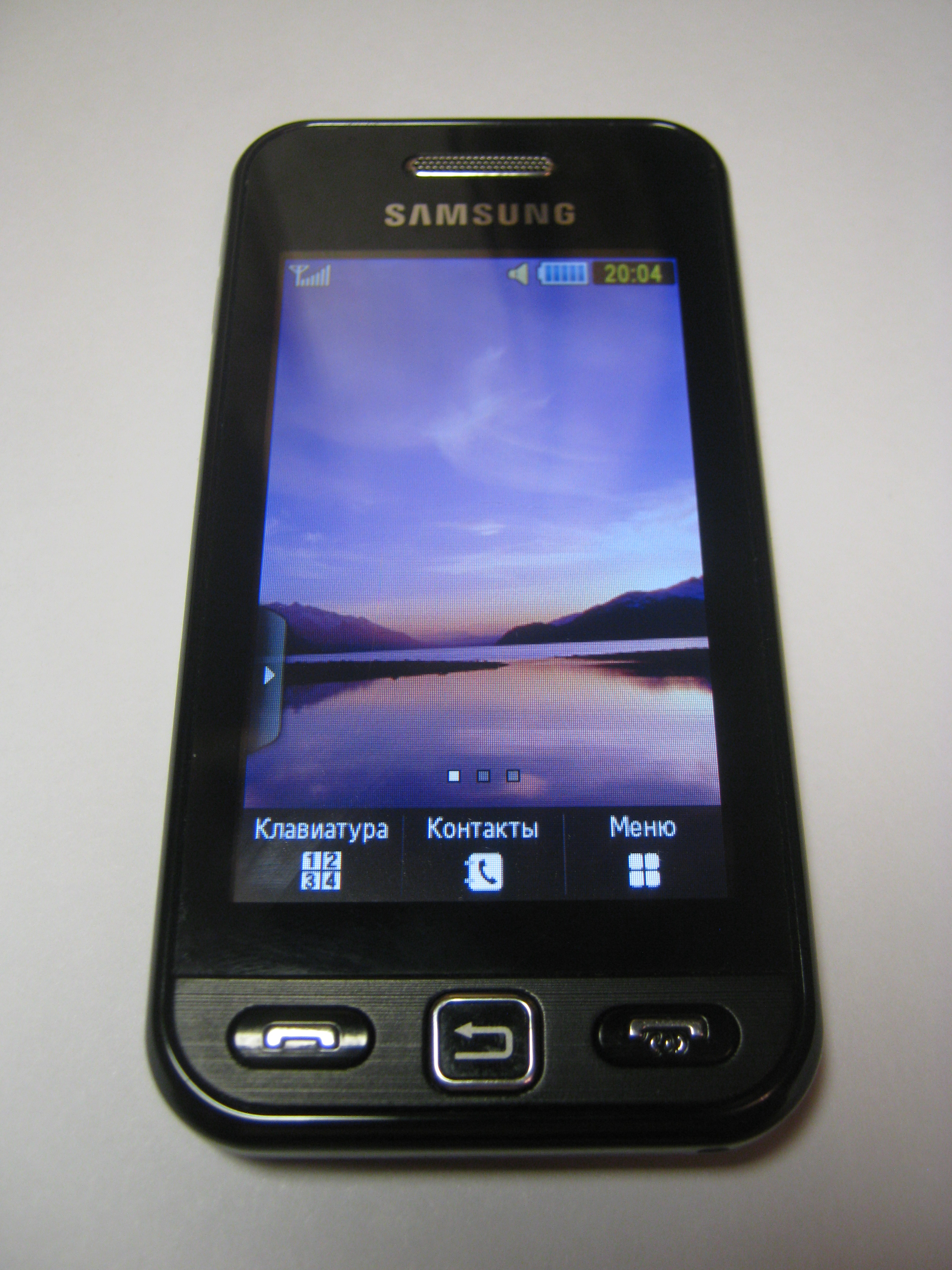
The Samsung Star/Tocco Lite (S5230) sold 10 million units.

- Nokia 5230 (5233), 150 million sold
- Apple iPhone 3GS, 35 million sold
- LG Cookie (KP500), 13 million sold
- Samsung Tocco Ultra (S8300), 12 million sold
- Samsung Star/Tocco Lite (S5230), 10 million sold
- Alcatel One Touch Mini (OT-708), 5 million sold
- Motorola Ming A1200, 3 million sold
- Nokia N97, 2 million sold
- Motorola Milestone/Droid, 1 million sold
- HTC Magic, 1 million sold

=== 2010 ===
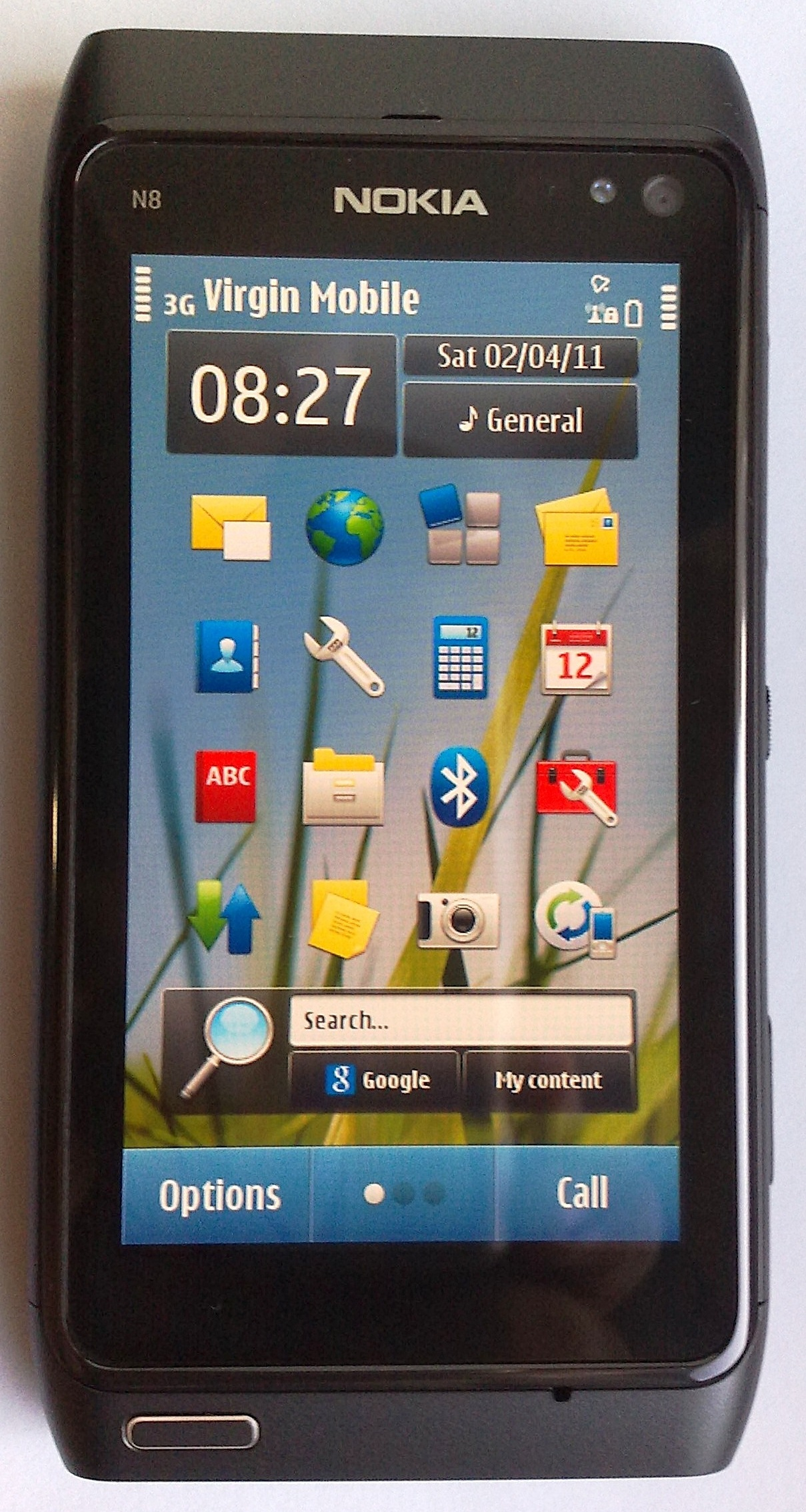
The Nokia N8 sold 6 million units.

- Nokia 1280, 100 million sold
- Apple iPhone 4, 50 million sold
- Samsung Galaxy S, 20 million sold
- Samsung S5620 Monte, 7 million sold
- Nokia N8, 6 million sold
- Motorola Milestone/Droid, 2 million sold
- Samsung Wave (S8500), 2 million sold

=== 2011 ===
- Apple iPhone 4S, 60 million sold
- Samsung Galaxy S II, 40 million sold
- Samsung Galaxy Y, 15 million sold
- HTC Evo 4G, 14 million sold
- Motorola Droid Bionic, 13 million sold
- Samsung Galaxy Note, 10 million sold
- ZTE Blade, 10 million sold
- Samsung Infuse, 9 million sold

=== 2012 ===
- Samsung Galaxy S III and Galaxy S III Mini, 70 million sold
- Apple iPhone 5, 70 million sold
- Samsung Galaxy Note II, 30 million sold
- Xiaomi Mi 2, 10 million sold

=== 2013 ===
- Nokia 105 (2013) and Nokia 105 (2015), 200 million sold
- Samsung Galaxy S4, 80 million sold
- Apple iPhone 5S, 52 million sold
- Samsung Galaxy Note 3, 10 million sold
- LG G2, 3 million sold

=== 2014 ===
- Apple iPhone 6 and iPhone 6 Plus, 222.4 million sold
- LG G3, 10 million sold
- Samsung Galaxy Note 4, 4.5 million sold

=== 2015 ===
- Apple iPhone 6S and iPhone 6S Plus, 174.5 million sold
- Samsung Galaxy S6 and Galaxy S6 edge, 45 million sold
- Huawei Mate 9, 15.8 million sold

=== 2016 ===
- Apple iPhone 7 and iPhone 7 Plus, 78.3 million sold
- Samsung Galaxy S7 and Galaxy S7 edge, 55 million sold
- Samsung Galaxy Grand Prime Plus, 24.2 million sold
- Oppo F1 Plus, 7 million sold
- LeEco Le 1s, 3 million sold
- Google Pixel and Pixel XL, 2.1 million sold

=== 2017 ===
- Apple iPhone 8 and iPhone 8 Plus, 86.3 million sold
- Apple iPhone X, 63 million sold
- Samsung Galaxy S8 and Galaxy S8+, 41 million sold
- Huawei Mate 10 and Mate 10 Pro, 17 million sold
- Samsung Galaxy Note 8, 10 million sold

=== 2018 ===
- Apple iPhone XR, 77.4 million sold
- Apple iPhone XS and iPhone XS Max, 48 million sold
- Samsung Galaxy S9 and Galaxy S9+, 35.4 million sold
- Huawei P20, P20 Pro and P20 Lite, 32 million sold
- Huawei Mate 20 and Mate 20 Pro, 17 million sold
- Samsung Galaxy J2 Core, 15.2 million sold
- Samsung Galaxy Note 9, 9.6 million sold
- Samsung Galaxy J4+, 6.4 million sold
- Samsung Galaxy J6+, 4.9 million sold

=== 2019 ===
- Apple iPhone 11, 102 million sold
- Apple iPhone 11 Pro and iPhone 11 Pro Max, 47.5 million sold
- Samsung Galaxy S10, Galaxy S10+ and Galaxy S10e, 37 million sold
- Samsung Galaxy A10, 30.3 million sold
- Xiaomi Redmi Note 8 and Redmi Note 8 Pro, 30 million sold
- Samsung Galaxy A50, 24.2 million sold
- Samsung Galaxy A51, 23.2 million sold
- Samsung Galaxy A20, 23.1 million sold
- Xiaomi Redmi Note 7 and Redmi Note 7 Pro, 20 million sold
- Huawei P30 and P30 Pro, 20 million sold
- Samsung Galaxy A01, 16.9 million sold
- Huawei Mate 30 and Mate 30 Pro, 12 million sold
- Redmi 6A, 10 million sold
- Oppo A5, 9.7 million sold
- Samsung Galaxy A30, 9.2 million sold
- Redmi 8A, 7.3 million sold
- Redmi 8, 6.8 million sold
- Samsung Galaxy A10s, 3.9 million sold
- Samsung Galaxy A30s, 3.4 million sold

=== 2020 ===
- Apple iPhone 12, iPhone 12 mini, iPhone 12 Pro and iPhone 12 Pro Max, 100 million sold
- Samsung Galaxy S20, Galaxy S20+ and Galaxy S20 Ultra, 28 million sold
- Apple iPhone SE (2nd generation), 24.2 million sold
- Samsung Galaxy A21s, 19.4 million sold
- Samsung Galaxy A11, 15.3 million sold
- Xiaomi Redmi Note 9 Pro, 15 million sold

=== 2021 ===
- Apple iPhone 12, iPhone 12 mini, iPhone 12 Pro and iPhone 12 Pro Max
- Apple iPhone 13, iPhone 13 mini, iPhone 13 Pro and iPhone 13 Pro Max
- Apple iPhone 11
- Samsung Galaxy A12
- Xiaomi Redmi 9A
- Apple iPhone SE (2nd generation)
- Xiaomi Redmi 9

=== 2022 ===
- iPhone 13, iPhone 13 mini, iPhone 13 Pro and iPhone 13 Pro Max
- iPhone 14 and iPhone 14 Pro series, 26 million sold
- Samsung Galaxy A13
- iPhone 12 and iPhone 12 mini
- iPhone SE (3rd generation)
- Samsung Galaxy A03

=== 2023 ===
- iPhone 14, iPhone 14 Pro, iPhone 14 Pro Max
- iPhone 13
- iPhone 15, iPhone 15 Pro, iPhone 15 Pro Max
- Samsung Galaxy A14 5G
- Samsung Galaxy A04e
- Samsung Galaxy A14 4G LTE

=== 2024 ===
- iPhone 15, iPhone 15 Pro, iPhone 15 Pro Max
- Samsung Galaxy A15 5G
- Samsung Galaxy A15 4G LTE
- iPhone 16 Pro, iPhone 16 Pro Max
- Samsung Galaxy S24 Ultra
- iPhone 14
- Samsung Galaxy A05

=== 2025 ===
- iPhone 17 Pro Max
- iPhone 16, iPhone 16 Pro, iPhone 16 Pro Max
- iPhone 16e
- Samsung Galaxy A16 5G
- Samsung Galaxy A16 4G LTE
- Samsung Galaxy A06
- Samsung Galaxy A36
- Samsung Galaxy A56

== Annual sales by manufacturer ==
Manufacturer	1992	1993	1994	1995	1996	1997	1998	1999	2000	2001	2002	2003	2004	2005	2006	2007	2008	2009	2010	2011	2012	2013	2014	2015*	2016*	2017*	2018*	2019*	2020*	2021*	2022*	2023*	2024*	2025*
Alcatel					2,631,000	6,967,000																												
Apple																2,300,000	12,000,000	24,889,000	46,598,300	89,263,200	130,133,200	150,785,900	191,426,000	225,850,600	216,064,000	214,924,400	219,048,400	219,475,100	199,800,000	237,000,000	226,400,000	234,600,000	232,100,000	247,800,000
BBK																								72,408,600										
Ericsson					15,914,000	23,827,000	29,785,000	41,467,000	26,956,000																									
HTC																			24,688,400	43,266,900	32,121,800													
Huawei																			23,814,700	40,663,400	47,288,300	53,295,100	70,499,000	104,094,700	132,824,900	150,534,300	202,901,400	240,615,500	182,600,000					
Lenovo																						45,284,700		72,748,200										
Lenovo/Motorola																							84,029,000											
LG												26,213,700	42,276,800	54,924,600	61,986,000	78,576,300	102,555,400	122,055,300	114,154,600	86,370,900	58,015,900	69,024,500	76,096,000			55,900,000	40,800,000	29,200,000						
Micromax																							37,094,000											
Microsoft																							185,660,000											
Motorola	4,000,000		12,000,000		60,000,000	25,328,000	32,319,000	47,818,000	60,094,000	59,097,000	64,640,000	75,177,000	104,124,000	144,920,000	209,251,000	164,307,000	106,590,000	58,475,200	38,553,700	40,269,000	33,916,300													
NEC	2,000,000		6,000,000																															
Nokia	3,000,000	5,000,000	9,000,000	13,000,000	18,000,000	20,593,000	37,374,000	76,335,000	126,369,000	139,672,000	151,422,000	180,672,000	207,231,000	265,615,000	344,916,000	435,453,000	472,315,000	440,881,600	461,318,200	422,478,300	333,938,000	250,793,100												
Oppo																									85,299,500	112,124,000	118,837,500	118,693,200	111,800,000	143,000,000	103,300,000	103,100,000	104,800,000	102,000,000
Others						34,725,000	44,286,000	96,376,000	137,173,000	115,877,000	107,941,400	113,009,600	144,643,700	166,985,100	184,588,000	218,604,300	248,189,000	299,179,200	488,569,300	597,326,900	587,399,300	613,710,000	629,360,000	635,368,500	682,314,300	582,104,700	566,249,000	536,430,000	454,800,000	413,000,000	362,700,000	361,800,000	402,900,000	400,000,000
Panasonic						8,627,000	13,397,000	15,581,000																										
RIM																12,000,000	23,000,000	34,000,000	47,451,600	51,541,900	34,210,300	18,000,000	8,000,000	4,000,000	2,000,000									
Samsung							4,686,000	17,687,000	20,639,000	28,234,000	41,684,000	54,475,000	85,238,000	103,754,000	116,480,000	154,541,000	199,182,000	235,772,000	281,065,800	313,904,200	384,631,200	444,444,200	392,546,000	320,400,000	306,446,600	321,263,300	295,043,700	296,194,000	253,000,000	272,000,000	260,900,000	226,600,000	223,400,000	241,200,000
Siemens									26,989,000	29,753,000	34,618,000	43,754,000	48,456,000	28,591,000																				
Sony																						37,595,700	37,791,000											
Sony Ericsson																93,414,500	54,873,400	41,819,200	32,597,500															
TCL																					37,176,600	49,531,300	64,026,000											
Transsion																																94,900,000	106,900,000	
Vivo																										99,684,800				131,000,000	99,000,000			103,900,000
Xiaomi																							56,529,000	65,618,600			122,387,000	126,049,200	145,800,000	190,000,000	153,100,000	145,900,000	168,500,000	165,300,000
Yulong																						32,601,400												
ZTE																			28,768,700	56,881,800	67,344,400	59,898,800	53,910,000											
Total						107,818,000	162,856,000	283,581,000	412,731,000	399,583,000	423,418,500	519,985,500	674,001,900	816,562,900	990,862,500	1,152,839,800	1,222,245,200	1,211,236,600	1,596,802,400	1,774,564,100	1,746,175,600	1,806,964,700	1,878,968,000	1,423,900,300	1,495,358,000	1,536,535,500	1,555,267,000	1,540,657,000	1,347,900,000	1,391,000,000	1,200,500,000	1,166,900,000	1,238,800,000	1,260,300,000

Note: This table is created from the data listed below. From 2015 onwards, the figures reflect only sales of smartphones (as opposed to feature phones).

=== 1992 ===
- Motorola: 4 million sold
- Nokia: 3 million sold
- NEC: 2 million sold

=== 1993 ===
- Nokia: 5 million sold

=== 1994 ===
- Motorola 12 million sold
- Nokia: 9 million sold
- NEC: 6 million sold

=== 1995 ===
- Nokia: 13 million sold

=== 1996 ===
- Motorola: 60 million sold
- Nokia: 18 million sold

=== 1997 ===
- Motorola: 25.328 million sold
- Nokia: 20.593 million sold
- Ericsson: 15.914 million sold
- Panasonic: 8.627 million sold
- Alcatel: 2.631 million sold
- Others: 34.725 million sold
- Total: 107.818 million sold

=== 1998 ===
- Nokia: 37.374 million sold
- Motorola: 32.319 million sold
- Ericsson: 23.827 million sold
- Panasonic: 13.397 million sold
- Alcatel: 6.967 million sold
- Samsung: 4.686 million sold
- Others: 44.286 million sold
- Total: 162.856 million sold

=== 1999 ===
- Nokia: 76.335 million sold
- Motorola: 47.818 million sold
- Ericsson: 29.785 million sold
- Samsung: 17.687 million sold
- Panasonic: 15.581 million sold
- Others: 96.376 million sold
- Total: 283.581 million sold

=== 2000 ===
- Nokia: 126.369 million sold
- Motorola: 60.094 million sold
- Ericsson: 41.467 million sold
- Siemens: 26.989 million sold
- Samsung: 20.639 million sold
- Others: 137.173 million sold
- Total: 412.731 million sold

=== 2001 ===
- Nokia: 139.672 million sold
- Motorola: 59.097 million sold
- Siemens: 29.753 million sold
- Samsung: 28.234 million sold
- Ericsson: 26.956 million sold
- Others: 115.877 million sold
- Total: 399.583 million sold

=== 2002 ===
- Nokia: 151.4218 million (35.8% market share)
- Motorola: 64.6401 million (15.3% market share)
- Samsung: 41.6844 million (9.8% market share)
- Siemens: 34.6180 million (8.2% market share)
- Sony Ericsson: 23.1129 million (5.5% market share)
- Others: 107.9414 million (25.5% market share)
- Total: 423.4185 million

=== 2003 ===
- Nokia: 180.6724 million (34.7% market share)
- Motorola: 75.1771 million (14.5% market share)
- Samsung: 54.4751 million (10.5% market share)
- Siemens: 43.7543 million (8.4% market share)
- Sony Ericsson: 26.6863 million (5.1% market share)
- LG: 26.2137 million (5.0% market share)
- Others: 113.0096 million (21.8% market share)
- Total: 519.9855 million

=== 2004 ===
- Nokia: 207.2313 million (30.7% market share)
- Motorola: 104.1242 million (15.4% market share)
- Samsung: 85.2384 million (12.6% market share)
- Siemens: 48.4558 million (7.2% market share)
- LG: 42.2768 million (6.3% market share)
- Sony Ericsson: 42.0317 million (6.2% market share)
- Others: 144.6437 million (21.6% market share)
- Total: 674.0019 million

=== 2005 ===
- Nokia: 265.6148 million (32.5% market share)
- Motorola: 144.9204 million (17.7% market share)
- Samsung: 103.7536 million (12.7% market share)
- LG: 54.9246 million (6.7% market share)
- Sony Ericsson: 51.7738 million (6.3% market share)
- Siemens: 28.5906 million (3.5% market share)
- Others: 166.9851 million (20.6% market share)
- Total: 816.5629 million

=== 2006 ===
- Nokia: 344.9159 million (34.8% market share)
- Motorola: 209.2509 million (21.1% market share)
- Samsung: 116.4801 million (11.8% market share)
- Sony Ericsson: 73.6416 million (7.4% market share)
- LG: 61.9860 million (6.3% market share)
- Others: 184.5880 million (18.6% market share)
- Total: 990.8625 million

=== 2007 ===
- Nokia: 435.4531 million (37.8% market share)
- Motorola: 164.307 million (14.3% market share)
- Samsung: 154.5407 million (13.4% market share)
- Sony Ericsson: 101.3584 million (8.8% market share)
- LG: 78.5763 million (6.8% market share)
- Apple: 2.3 million sold
- Others: 218.6043 million (18.9% market share)
- Total: 1,152.8398 million

=== 2008 ===
- Nokia: 472,315,000 (38.6% market share)
- Samsung: 199,182,000 (16.3% market share)
- Motorola: 106,590,000 (8.7% market share)
- LG: 102,555,400 (8.4% market share)
- Sony Ericsson: 93,414,500 (7.6% market share)
- Apple: 12,000,000 sold
- Others: 248,189,000 (20.4% market share)
- Total: 1,222,245,200

=== 2009 ===
- Nokia: 440.8816 million (36.4% market share)
- Samsung: 235.7720 million (19.5% market share)
- LG: 122.0553 million (10.1%market share)
- Motorola: 58.4752 million (4.8% market share)
- Sony Ericsson: 54.8734 million (4.5% market share)
- Apple: 24.889 million sold
- Others: 299.1792 million (24.7% market share)
- Total: 1,211.2366 million

=== 2010 ===
- Nokia: 461.3182 million (28.9% market share)
- Samsung: 281.0658 million (17.6% market share)
- LG: 114.1546 million (7.1% market share)
- Research in Motion: 47.4516 million (3.0% market share)
- Apple: 46.5983 million (2.9% market share)
- Sony Ericsson: 41.8192 million (2.6% market share)
- Motorola: 38.5537 million (2.4% market share)
- ZTE: 28.7687 million (1.8% market share)
- HTC: 24.6884 million (1.5% market share)
- Huawei: 23.8147 million (1.5% market share)
- Others: 488.5693 million (30.6% market share)
- Total: 1,596.8024 million

=== 2011 ===
- Nokia: 422.4783 million (23.8% market share)
- Samsung: 313.9042 million (17.7% market share)
- Apple: 89.2632 million (5.0% market share)
- LG: 86.3709 million (4.9% market share)
- ZTE: 56.8818 million (3.2% market share)
- Research in Motion: 51.5419 million (2.9% market share)
- HTC: 43.2669 million (2.4% market share)
- Huawei: 40.6634 million (2.3% market share)
- Motorola: 40.2690 million (2.3% market share)
- Sony Ericsson: 32.5975 million (1.8% market share)
- Others: 597.3269 million (33.7% market share)
- Total: 1,774.5641 million

=== 2012 ===
- Samsung: 384.6312 million (22.0% market share)
- Nokia: 333.9380 million (19.1% market share)
- Apple: 130.1332 million (7.5% market share)
- ZTE: 67.3444 million (3.9% market share)
- LG: 58.0159 million (3.3% market share)
- Huawei Technologies: 47.2883 million (2.7% market share)
- TCL Communication: 37.1766 million (2.1% market share)
- Research in Motion: 34.2103 million (2.0% market share)
- Motorola: 33.9163 million (1.9% market share)
- HTC: 32.1218 million (1.8% market share)
- Sony Mobile: 29.2 million
- Others: 587.3996 million (33.6% market share)
- Total: 1,746.1756 million

=== 2013 ===
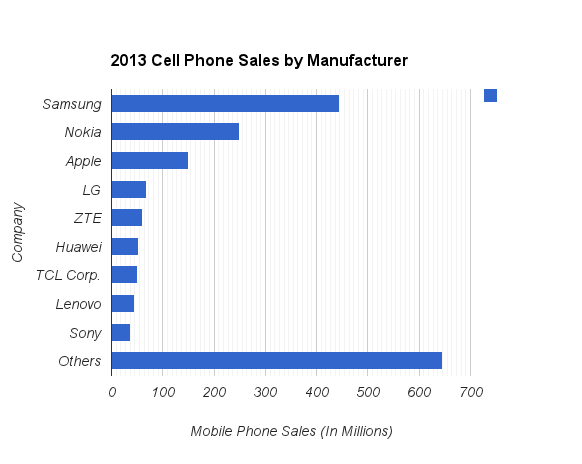
2013 in mobile phones

- Samsung: 444.4442 million (24.6% market share)
- Nokia: 250.7931 million (13.9% market share)
- Apple: 150.7859 million (8.3% market share)
- LG: 69.0245 million (3.8% market share)
- ZTE: 59.8988 million (3.3% market share)
- Huawei: 53.2951 million (2.9% market share)
- TCL Communication: 49.5313 million (2.7% market share)
- Lenovo: 45.2847 million (2.5% market share)
- Sony Mobile Communications: 37.5957 million (2.1% market share)
- Yulong: 32.6014 million (1.8% market share)
- Others: 613.7100 million (34% market share)
- Total: 1,806.9647 million

=== 2014 ===
- Samsung: 392.546 million (20.9% market share)
- Apple: 191.426 million (10.2% market share)
- Microsoft: 185.660 million (9.9% market share)
- Lenovo Motorola: 84.029 million (4.5% market share)
- LG: 76.096 million (4% market share)
- Huawei: 70.499 million (3.8% market share)
- TCL Communication: 64.026 million (3.4% market share)
- Xiaomi: 56.529 million (3% market share)
- ZTE: 53.910 million (2.9% market share)
- Sony Mobile: 37.791 million (2% market share)
- Micromax: 37.094 million (2% market share)
- Others: 629.360 million (33.5% market share)
- Total: 1,878.968 million

=== 2015 ===
Note that previous years have listed sales of mobile phones including non smartphones (so called feature phones) while from 2015 and on the statistics only show smartphone sales.

- Samsung: 320.4 million (22.5% market share)
- Apple: 225.8506 million (15.9% market share)
- Huawei: 104.0947 million (7.3% market share)
- Lenovo: 72.7482 million (5.1% market share)
- Xiaomi: 65.6186 million (4.6% market share)
- Others: 635.3685 million (44.6% market share)
- Total: 1,423.9003 million

=== 2016 ===
- Samsung: 306.4466 million (20.5% market share)
- Apple: 216.0640 million (14.4% market share)
- Huawei: 132.8249 million (8.9% market share)
- OPPO: 85.2995 million (5.7% market share)
- BBK Communication Equipment excl. oppo: 72.4086 million (4.8% market share)
- Others: 682.3143 million (45.6% market share)
- Total: 1,495.3580 million

=== 2017 ===
- Samsung: 321.2633 million (20.9% market share)
- Apple: 214.9244 million (14% market share)
- Huawei: 150.534.3 million (9.8% market share)
- Oppo: 112.124 million (7.3% market share)
- Vivo: 99.6848 million (6.5% market share)
- Others: 638.0047 million (41.5% market share)
- Total: 1,536.5355 million

=== 2018 ===
- Samsung: 295.0437 million (19% market share)
- Apple: 209.0484 million (13.4% market share)
- Huawei: 202.9014 million (13% market share)
- Xiaomi: 122.3870 million (7.9% market share)
- Oppo: 118.837.5 million (7.6% market share)
- Others: 607.0490 million (39% market share)
- Total: 1,555,267.0

=== 2019 ===
- Samsung: 296.194 million (19.2% market share)
- Huawei: 240.6155 million (15.6% market share)
- Apple: 193.4751 million (10.5% market share)
- Xiaomi: 126.0492 million (8.2% market share)
- OPPO: 118.6932 million (7.7% market share)
- Others: 565.630 million (36.7% market share)
- Total: 1,540.657 million

=== 2020 ===
- Samsung: 253 million (18.8% market share)
- Apple: 199.8 million (14.8% market share)
- Huawei: 182.6 million (13.5% market share)
- Xiaomi: 145.8 million (10.8% market share)
- Oppo: 111.8 million (8.3% market share)
- Others: 454.8 million (33.7% market share)
- Total: 1,347.9 million

=== 2021 ===
- Samsung: 272 million (21% market share)
- Apple: 237 million (16% market share)
- Xiaomi: 190 million (14% market share)
- Oppo: 143 million (11% market share)
- Vivo: 131 million (10% market share)
- Others: 413 million (28% market share)
- Total: 1.391 billion

=== 2022 ===
- Samsung: 260.9 million (21.6% market share)
- Apple: 226.4 million (18.8% market share)
- Xiaomi: 153.1 million (12.7% market share)
- Oppo: 103.3 million (8.6% market share)
- Vivo: 99.0 million (8.2% market share)
- Others: 362.7 million (30.1% market share)
- Total: 1.2005 billion

=== 2023 ===
Apple sold the most phones for the first time, while Samsung lost the top position for the first time since 2012.

- Apple: 234.6 million (20.1% market share)
- Samsung: 226.6 million (19.4% market share)
- Xiaomi: 145.9 million (12.5% market share)
- Oppo: 103.1 million (8.8% market share)
- Transsion: 94.9 million (8.1% market share)
- Others: 361.8 million (31.0% market share)
- Total: 1.1669 billion

=== 2024 ===
- Apple: 232.1 million (18.7% market share)
- Samsung: 223.4 million (18% market share)
- Xiaomi: 168.5 million (13.6% market share)
- Transsion: 106.9 million (8.6% market share)
- Oppo: 104.8 million (8.5% market share)
- Others: 402.9 million (32.5% market share)
- Total: 1,238.8 million

=== 2025 ===
- Apple: 247.8 million (19.7% market share)
- Samsung: 241.2 million (19.1% market share)
- Xiaomi: 165.3 million (13.1% market share)
- Vivo: 103.9 million (8.2% market share)
- Oppo: 102.0 million (8.1% market share)
- Others: 400 million (31.7% market share)
- Total: 1,260.3 million

== See also ==
- Mobile Phone Museum
