= Nokia Series 30 =

Mobile operating system

Series 30
- Developer: Nokia
- Working state: Inactive
- Source model: Closed source, no external applications
- Supported platforms: ARM, C166 v2, M68k
- License: Proprietary
- Preceded by: Series 20
- Succeeded by: Series 30+

Support status
- Obsolete, unsupported

Nokia Series 30, often shortened as S30, is a software platform and application user interface that was previously used by Nokia for its basic entry-level mobile phones. Unlike Series 40, Series 30 phones are not capable of running Java apps and do not have Internet access for web browsing and email.

== History and features ==
Series 30 was originally developed for the Nokia DCT4 hardware platform as a replacement of Series 20 on the older DCT3. The first phones with Series 30 and DCT4 were Nokia 8310 and Nokia 6310 released in 2001. The user interface on early S30 was almost identical to S20 but had several technical improvements including GPRS support.

Menu displayed on a Nokia 2600 (2004)

Menu displayed on a Nokia 1800 (2010)

Nokia created Series 40 optimised for colour displays in 2002, the Nokia's first colour phone was the 3510i, using the Series 40 platform, after which Series 30 continued solely for ultrabasic (1xxx and 2xxx) monochrome phones. The Nokia 2600 became the first low-end Series 30 phone with a colour display in 2004.

Most S30 phones have only a 4-way d-pad. The Nokia 1100 and Nokia 2100 have just have a 2-way d-pad. Early basic S30 phones had just one soft key, but Nokia 1110 released in 2005 was the first to have two keys and the 1600 was the first colour Series 30 phone to have two keys and a 4-way d-pad, being released in the same year.

The last S30 devices were released in 2013, the last device being the first edition of 105, after which Nokia switched to MediaTek system-on-chips and it was succeeded by Series 30+.

The production of the S30 devices were ended by summer 2015, by the Nokia 100 and the first edition of 105 being discontinued from production.

== List of devices ==
The following is a list of Series 30 devices released by Nokia: (list incomplete)

- Pre-Series 40
  - Nokia 3510
  - Nokia 6310
  - Nokia 6310i
  - Nokia 6510
  - Nokia 8310
  - Nokia 8910
- Released in 2003
  - Nokia 1100
  - Nokia 2100
  - Nokia 2300
- Released in 2004
  - Nokia 2600
- Released in 2005
  - Nokia 1110
  - Nokia 1600
  - Nokia 1110i
  - Nokia 1101
- Released in 2006
  - Nokia 2310
  - Nokia 1112
- Released in 2007
  - Nokia 1650
  - Nokia 1200
  - Nokia 1208
- Released in 2008
  - Nokia 1209
- Released in 2009
  - Nokia 5030 XpressRadio
  - Nokia 1202
  - Nokia 1661
- Released in 2010
  - Nokia 1616
  - Nokia 1800
  - Nokia 1280
  - Nokia C1-00 - (RM-689)
- Released in 2011
  - Nokia X1-00
  - Nokia X1-01
  - Nokia 100
  - Nokia 101
- Released in 2012
  - Nokia 103
- Released in 2013
  - Nokia 105
  - Nokia 106.1
  - Nokia 107 Dual SIM

== See also ==
- Series 30+
- Series 40
- Series 60
- Series 80
- Series 90
