= 1112 (disambiguation) =

1112 is the year AD 1112.

1112 may also refer to:

- Hispano Aviación HA-1112, a spanish WW2 aircraft
- Messerschmitt P.1112. a proposed German WW2 aircraft
- Nokia 1112, a low end nokia phone
- The Pizza Company, famous for its "1112" hotline
- USS Taylor (FFG-50) which has the identification code PFG-1112

== See also ==
- 11/12 (disambiguation)
