= Nokia 2310 =

2006 cell phone model

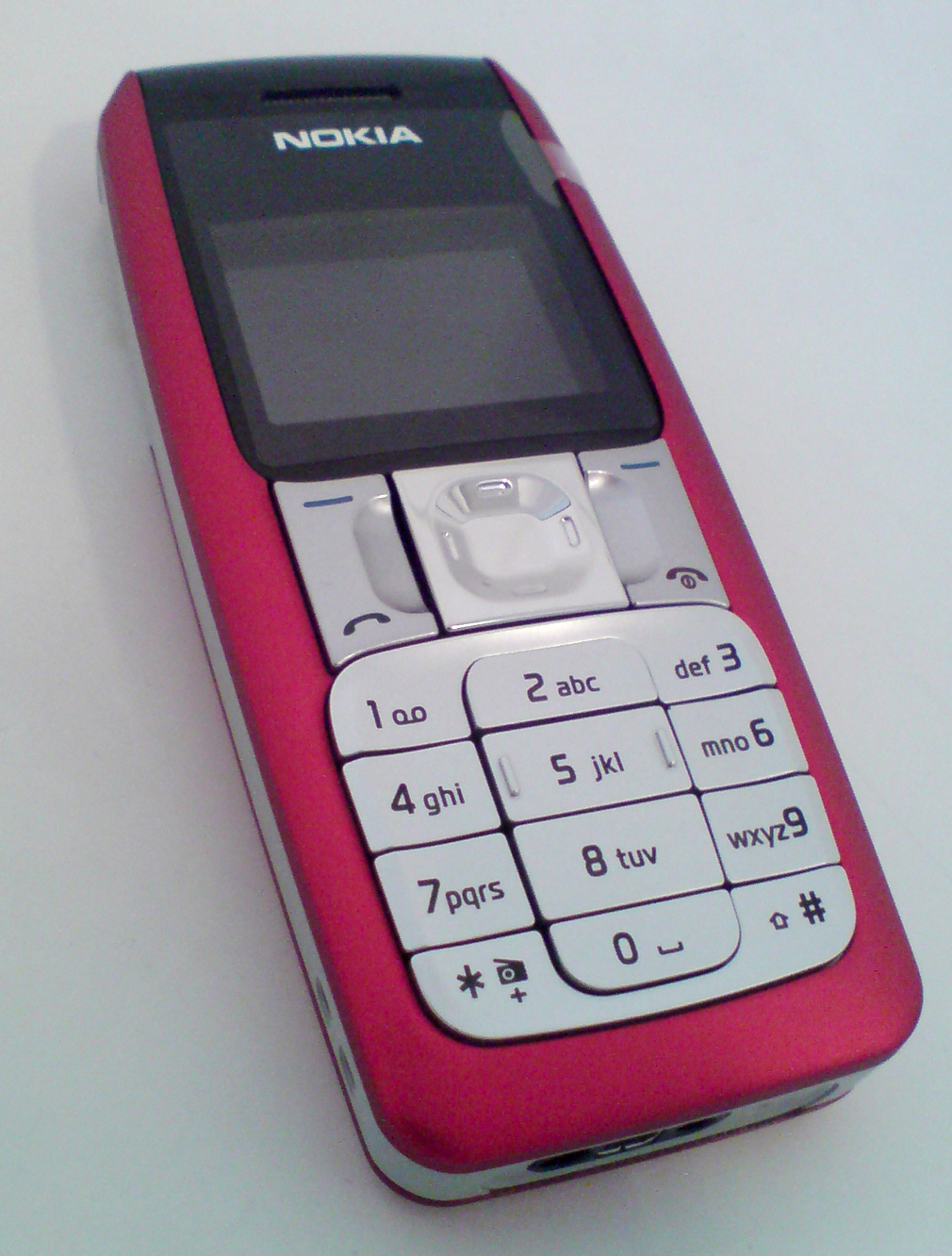
- Manufacturer: Nokia
- Availability by region: 30 March 2006
- Successor: Nokia 1208
- Related: Nokia 2610; Nokia 1600
- Compatible networks: Dual band, GSM 900/1800
- Form factor: Candybar
- Dimensions: 105×44×19 mm (4.13×1.73×0.75 in)
- Weight: 85 g (3 oz)
- Operating system: Series 30
- Memory: 4 MB
- Removable storage: No
- Rear camera: No
- Display: 96 x 68 65,536 colours
- Data inputs: Keypad

The Nokia 2310 is a mobile phone designed for lower budget markets, announced in March 2006. It was available in three colors: red, blue, and white.

The 2310 is similar to the Nokia 1600, but with a different design and FM radio support.

== Features ==
- Dual band, GSM 900/1800
- Size 105 x 44 x 19 mm
- Weight 85 g
- Battery talk time 4 – 6 hours
- Battery standby: up to 400 hours
- Colour screen capable of displaying 65,536 colors, 96 x 68 pixel resolution, 4 lines
- FM radio
- Phone book with space for 200 entries
- MP3-grade ringtones
- Loudspeaker to allow hands free calls
- SMS and picture messaging, with space for 60 messages
- Animated screensavers and wallpapers
- 3 built-in games (Bounce, Nature Park, Soccer League, Rapid Roll, Dice Games, Manage It!, and Snake Xenzia)
- Alarm clock

== Gallery ==
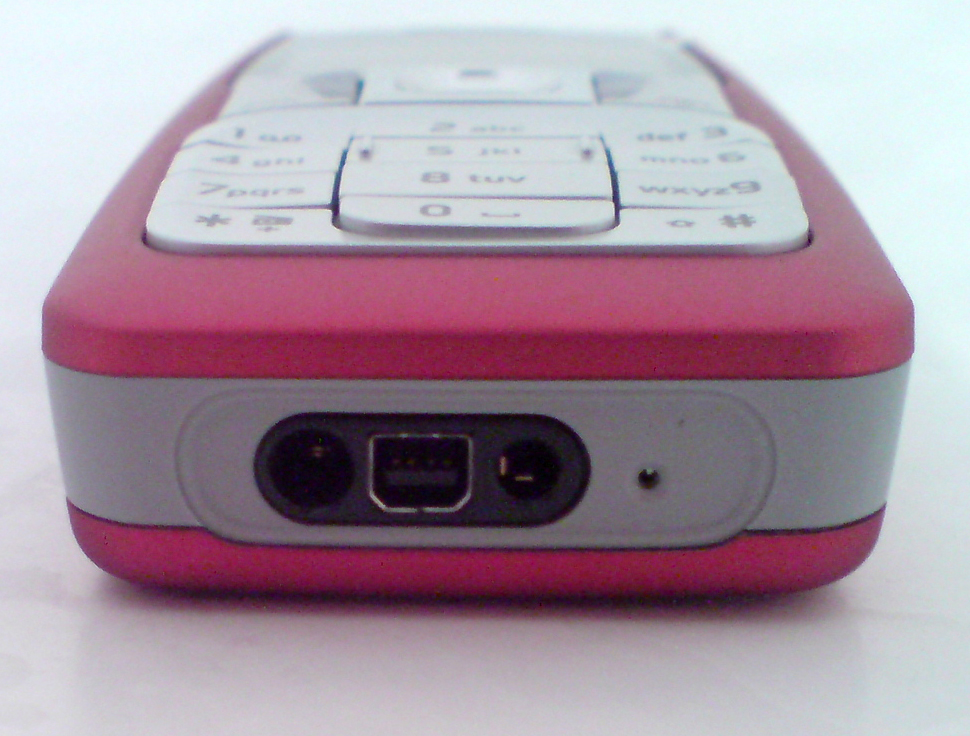
The base of the phone, allowing handsfree kit and power connection

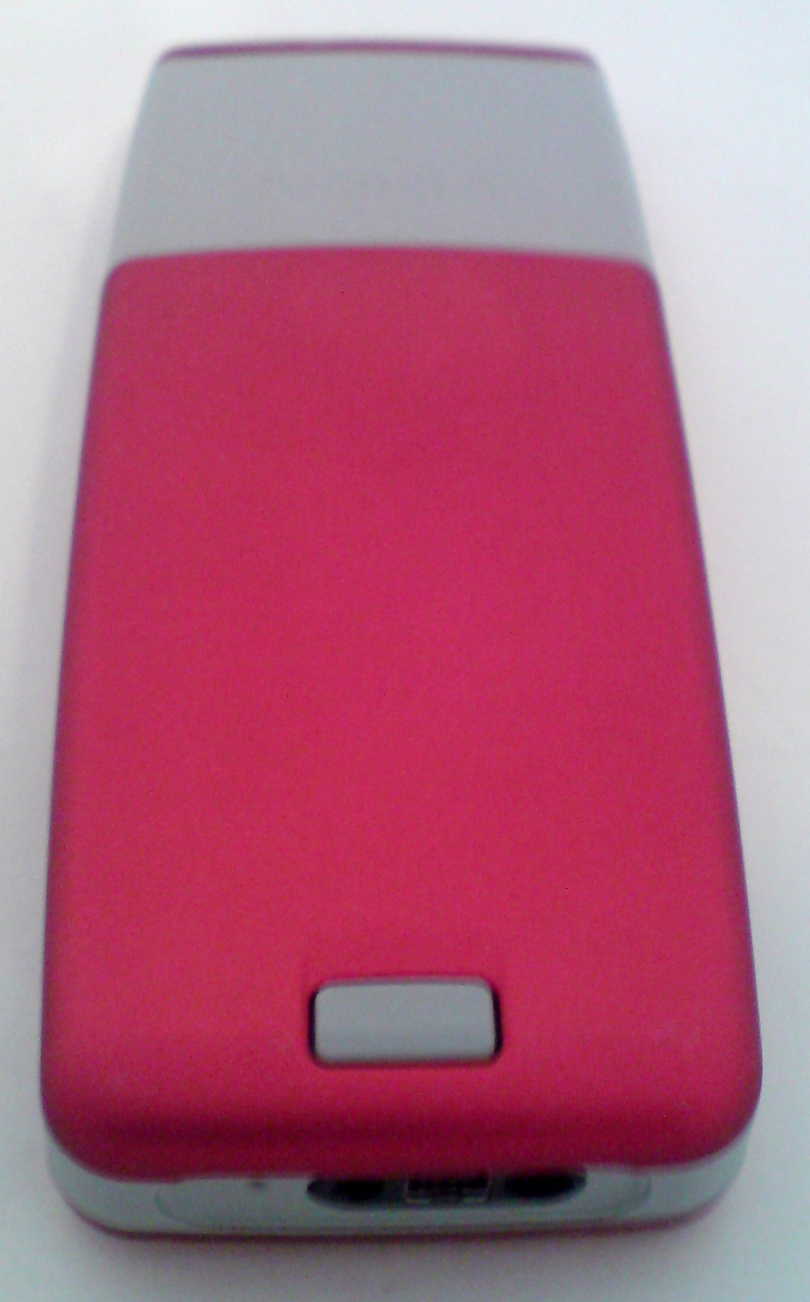
Nokia 2310 mobile phone rear cover

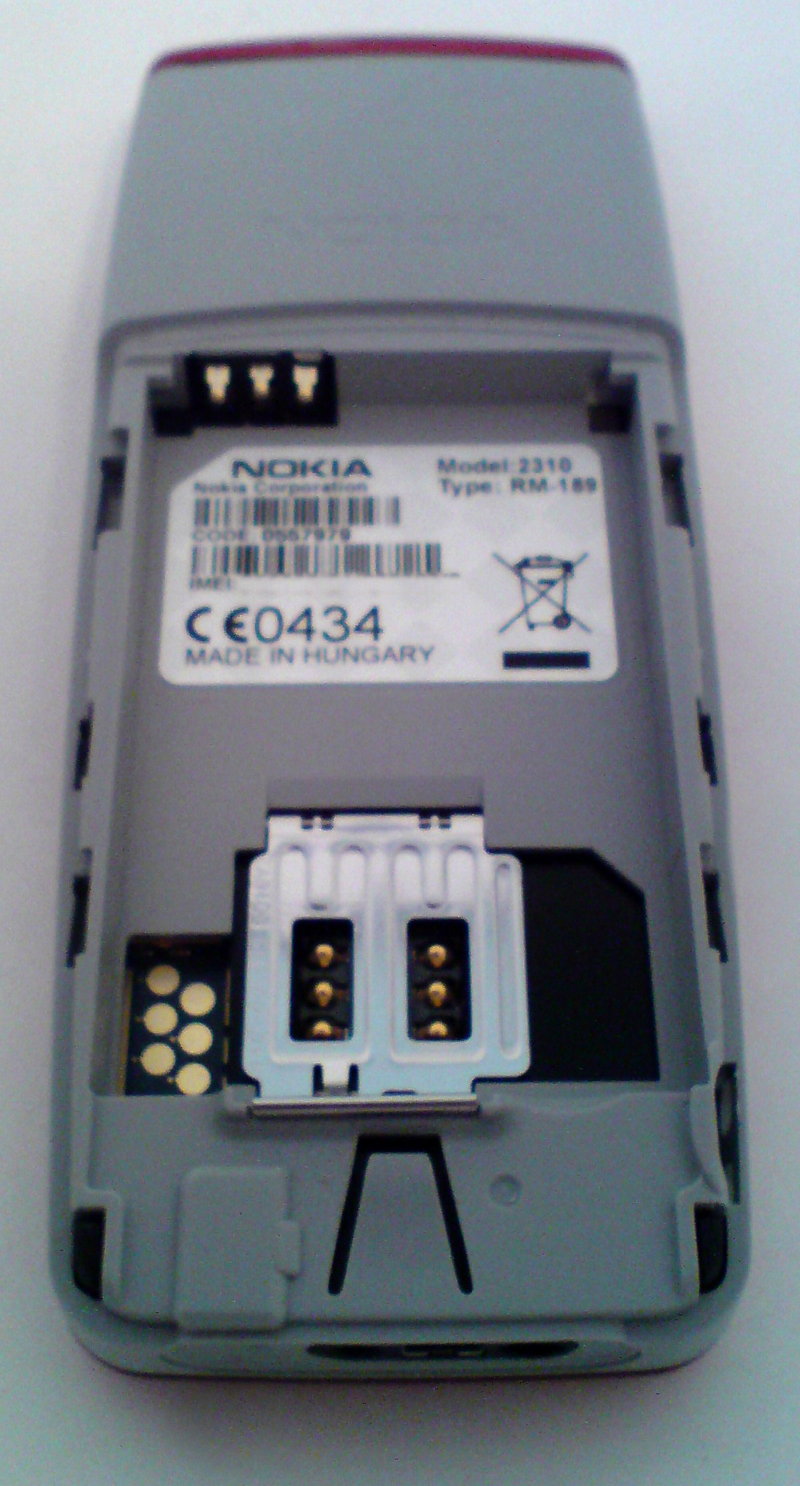
Nokia 2310 mobile phone battery and SIM card compartment

== Reception ==
Frank Lewis of CNET gave the Nokia 2310 a rating of 2 out of 5 stars: he praised its call quality and battery life and noted it was "a bargain at just £25", but found weaknesses in its lack of camera, lack of mobile data and "poor" CSTN LCD screen, concluding that it was not a "sensible budget buy".
