= Nokia 1110 =

2005 cell phone model

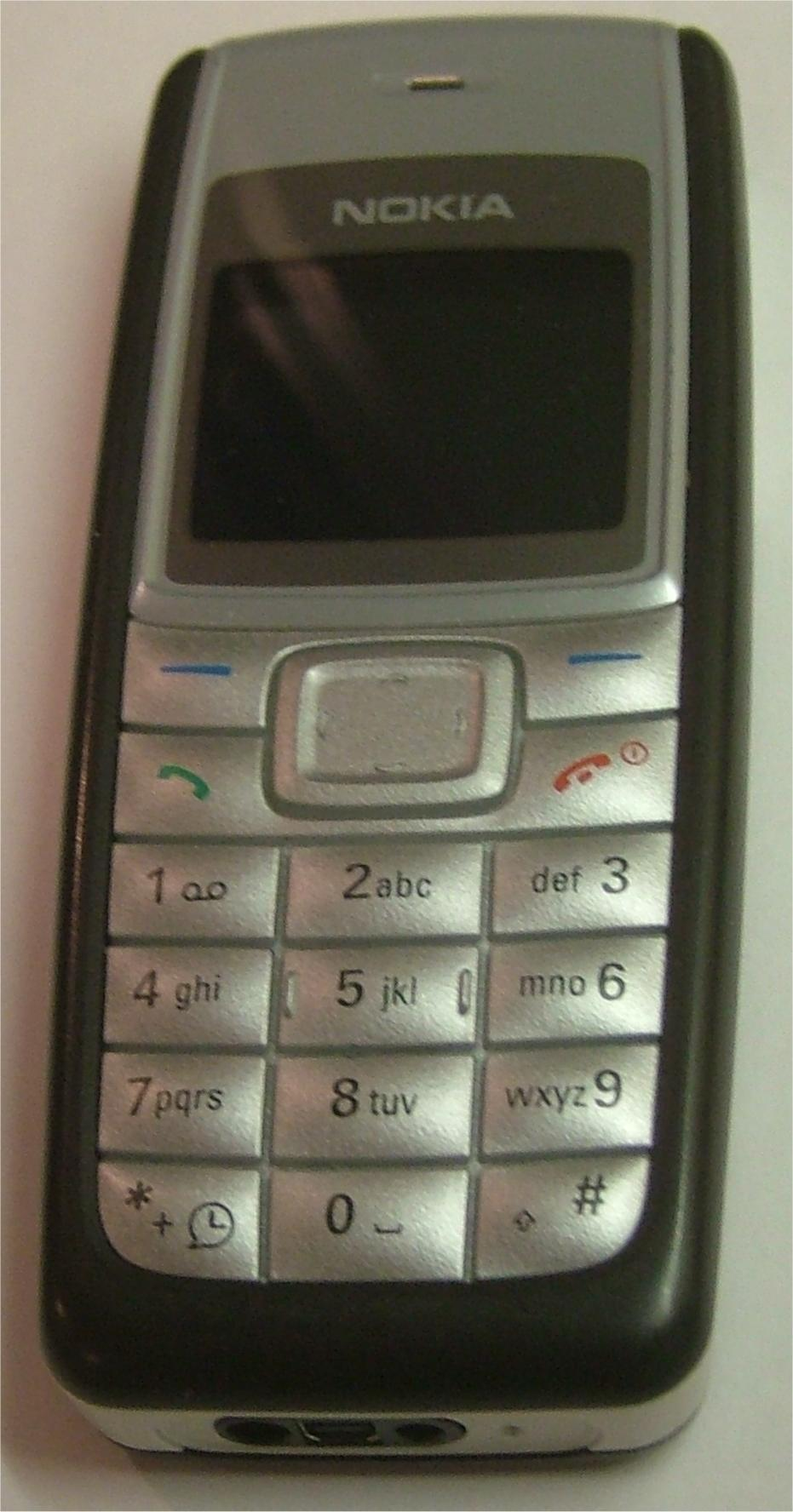
- Manufacturer: Nokia
- Availability by region: June 2005
- Predecessor: Nokia 1100 (1110); Nokia 1101 (1110i)
- Successor: Nokia 1200
- Related: Nokia 1112; Nokia 1600
- Compatible networks: 2G Network GSM 900 / 1800; US version - GSM 850 / 1900
- Form factor: Candybar
- Dimensions: 104×44×17 mm (4.09×1.73×0.67 in)
- Weight: 80 g (3 oz)
- Operating system: Series 30 (2004-2013)
- Battery: Nokia BL-5CA Li-Ion 700 mAh
- Display: 96x68 pixels, monochrome
- Connectivity: Cellular network GSM

The Nokia 1110 and Nokia 1110i are low-end GSM mobile phones which were made by Nokia. The 1110 was released in 2005; the 1110i was released in 2006. Both were aimed at first-time mobile phone users. In Nokia's view, the 1110i had the advantage of ease-of-use, reliability and a low price. These phones are very similar to the Nokia 1100. Between January and May 2007, the 1110 was marketed by Nokia as their standard low-end monochrome model before being superseded by the Nokia 1200. One of its key markets was that of developing countries.

The Nokia 1110 is one of the best-selling mobile phones of all time, selling about 250 million units.

The differences between the models, are that 1110 features an inverted (negative) monochrome display with green texts in a black (slightly amber) background, and the 1110i features a standard, backlit in green monochrome display.

Both models feature a speaking clock, which was a novel feature during the time of release. A user can use the speaking clock by pressing and holding the asterisk button while in the home screen.
