= Nokia 1208 =

2008 cell phone model

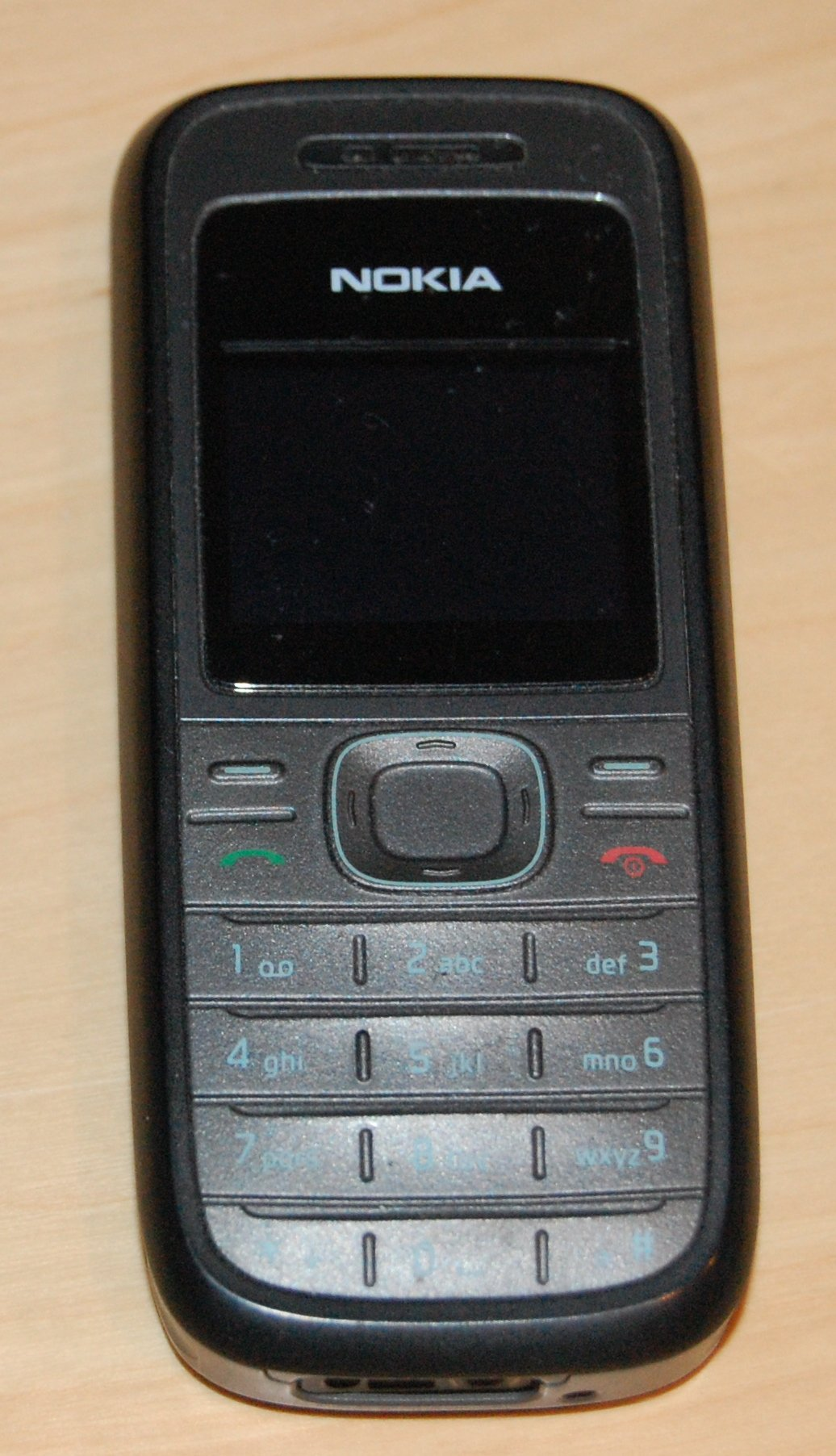
- Brand: Nokia
- Type: Feature phone
- First released: 2 May 2007
- Availability by region: 15 January 2008
- Discontinued: Q3 2010
- Predecessor: Nokia 1600
- Successor: Nokia 1661
- Related: Nokia 1209
- Compatible networks: GSM 850, 1900 MHz
- Form factor: Bar
- Dimensions: 27.6 mm (1.09 in) H 21.8 mm (0.86 in) W
- Weight: 79.9 g (2.82 oz)
- Operating system: Series 30
- Battery: 700 mAh; User replaceable
- Display: 1.4" TFT LCD, 96x68 pixels (ppi)
- Sound: Loudspeaker, S20 Pin earjack
- Data inputs: Keypad

The Nokia 1208 is a low-end GSM mobile phone sold by the Finnish company Nokia under their Ultrabasic series. The phone was announced in May 2007 and released in January 2008. It is very similar to Nokia 1200, the difference being the color display. The phone sold 100 million units, making it one of the most successful phones to date, along with Nokia 1200, which sold 150 million units.

== Features ==
- The Nokia 1208 has a CSTN display with 65,000 colours, and is 29 x 23 millimeters (1.5 inches). The resolution is 96 x 68 pixels. It had two models: the colour display and the LCD model.
- The Nokia 1208 has interchangeable body-plates
