= Nokia 1112 =

2006 mobile phone model

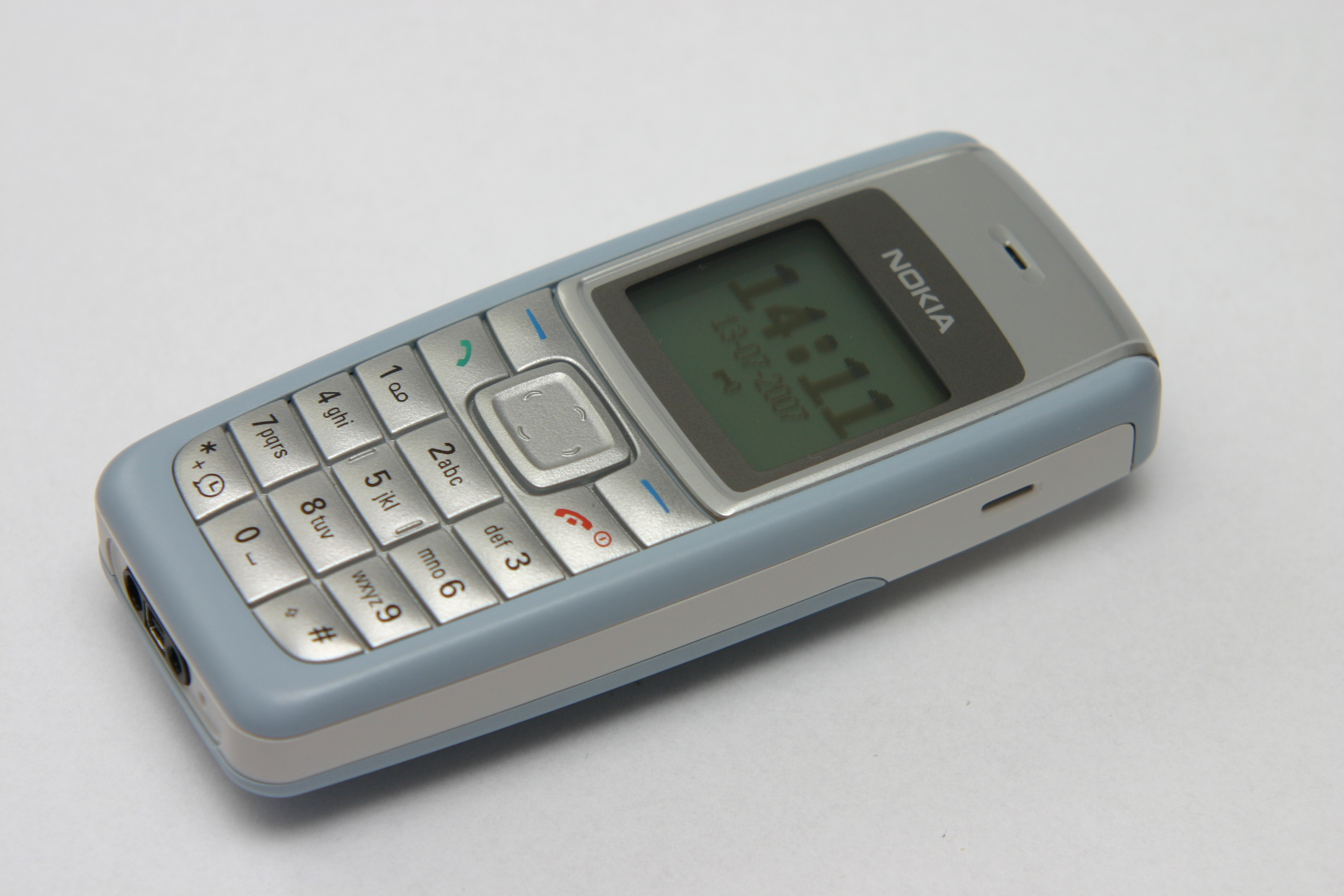
- Manufacturer: Nokia
- Availability by region: 30 March 2006
- Predecessor: Nokia 1108
- Successor: Nokia 1202
- Related: Nokia 1110; Nokia 1600
- Compatible networks: GSM dual band
- Form factor: Candybar
- Dimensions: 104×44×17 mm (4.09×1.73×0.67 in)
- Weight: 80 gs (including battery)
- Battery: 700 mAh Li-ion
- Display: 96 x 68 pixel monochrome
- Data inputs: Keypad

The Nokia 1112 is a low-end GSM mobile phone sold by Nokia. The 1112 was released in March 2006.

With graphical icons and large font sizes, the Nokia 1112 is a mobile phone aimed for first-time mobile phone users.

As a dual-band device it operates on GSM-900/1800 or GSM-850/1900 networks.

It has a 96 x 68 pixels resolution monochrome display with white backlighting, opposed to the similar model, 1110i, with green backlighting and an integrated handsfree speaker.

The cell phone has built in utilities, such as a calculator and a stopwatch and it supports polyphonic ringtones. Beside other basic features like SMS and picture messaging it has a speaking clock and alarm.

Its internal memory is 4 MB in size, most of it reserved for the 30+ low-bitrate polyphonic melodies, and also enabling it to hold up 200 phonebook entries.

The battery powers the phone for up to over 5 hours talk time, or up to 15 days if left in stand-by mode.

== See also ==
- List of Nokia products
