= 11/12 =

11/12 may refer to:

- November 12 (month-day date notation)
- December 11 (day-month date notation)
