= Motorola C139 =

Cellular phone

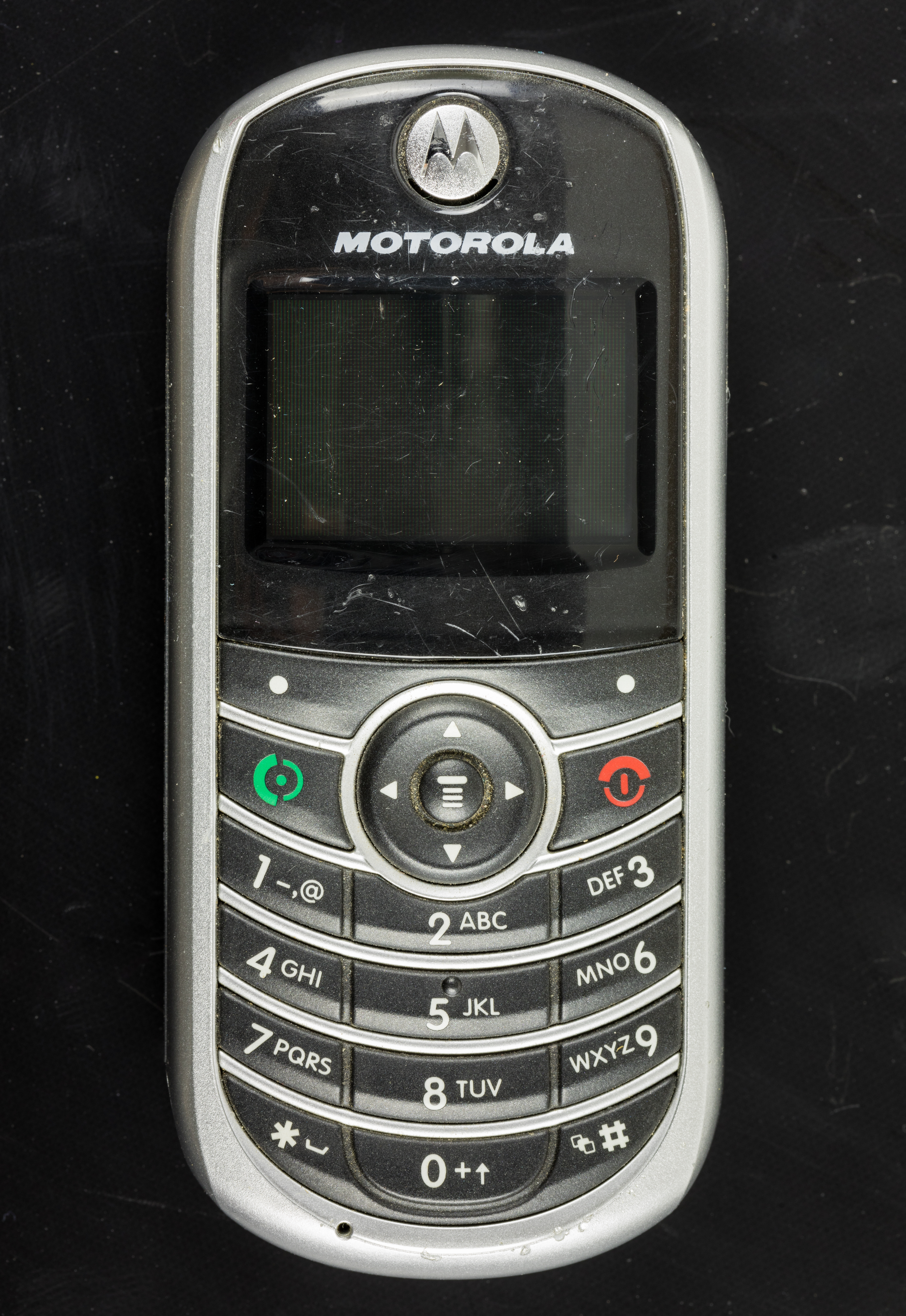
- First released: 2005
- Units sold: 60 million
- Units shipped: 441,980
- Weight: 85 g (3.2 oz)
- Memory: Up to 100 names and numbers
- Display: TFT, 65K colors

Motorola C139 is a cellular phone designed and manufactured for Motorola by an Original design manufacturer. It addresses people with basic needs, and has limited features. This phone has been offered on AT&T's GoPhone service, TracFone, Cellular One, and Net10. It is primarily focused for prepaid plans, and was claimed by a PC Magazine review to be the cheapest unlocked GSM handset. The Motorola C139 is supported by OsmocomBB.

== Design flaws ==
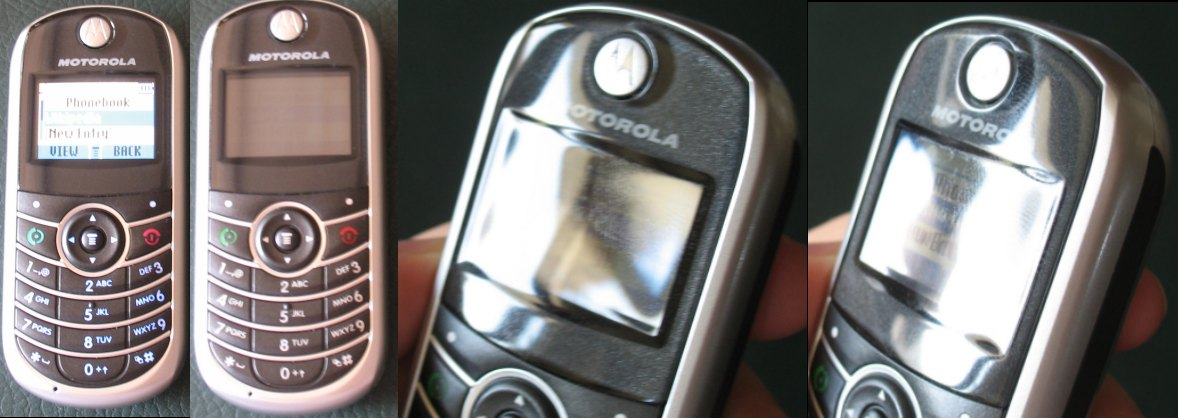
A demonstration of the Motorola C139 screen glare, and unreadability with the backlight off.

This phone is designed so that the LCD screen is only readable with the backlight on.
