= HMD 105 =

HMD 105 (formerly Nokia 105 from 2013 to 2024, also called as Nokia 108 in 2024) is the name of a series of different mobile phones manufactured or marketed by HMD Global (formerly Nokia and Microsoft Mobile). Models aside from the 4G versions communicate on second-generation cellular (2G) networks only, rather than later standards such as 4G, and will no longer work when 2G networks are phased out, as has been happening since 2016 in different regions.

These include:

- Nokia 105 (2013), released in 2013 and aimed at markets in developing nations.
- Nokia 105 (2015), developed by Microsoft Mobile and released on 3 June 2015. Later produced by HMD Global. (Model: RM-1134)
- Nokia 105 (2017), developed by HMD Global and released on 17 July 2017.
- Nokia 105 (2019), made by HMD Global, was unveiled on 24 July 2019, and released in September 2019.
- Nokia 105 4G (2021), made by HMD Global, was unveiled on 15 June 2021.
- Nokia 105 (2022), made by HMD Global.
- Nokia 105 4G (2023), made by HMD Global.
- Nokia 105 (2023), made by HMD Global.
- Nokia 105 Pro 4G (2023), made by HMD Global.
- Nokia 105 (2024), made by HMD Global.
- HMD 105 Pure (2024), also called as Nokia 105 Classic, made by HMD Global.
- HMD 105 (2024), also called as Nokia 108, made by HMD Global.
- HMD 105 4G (2024), also called as Nokia 108 4G, made by HMD Global.
