= Nokia 1100 =

2003 mobile phone produced by Nokia

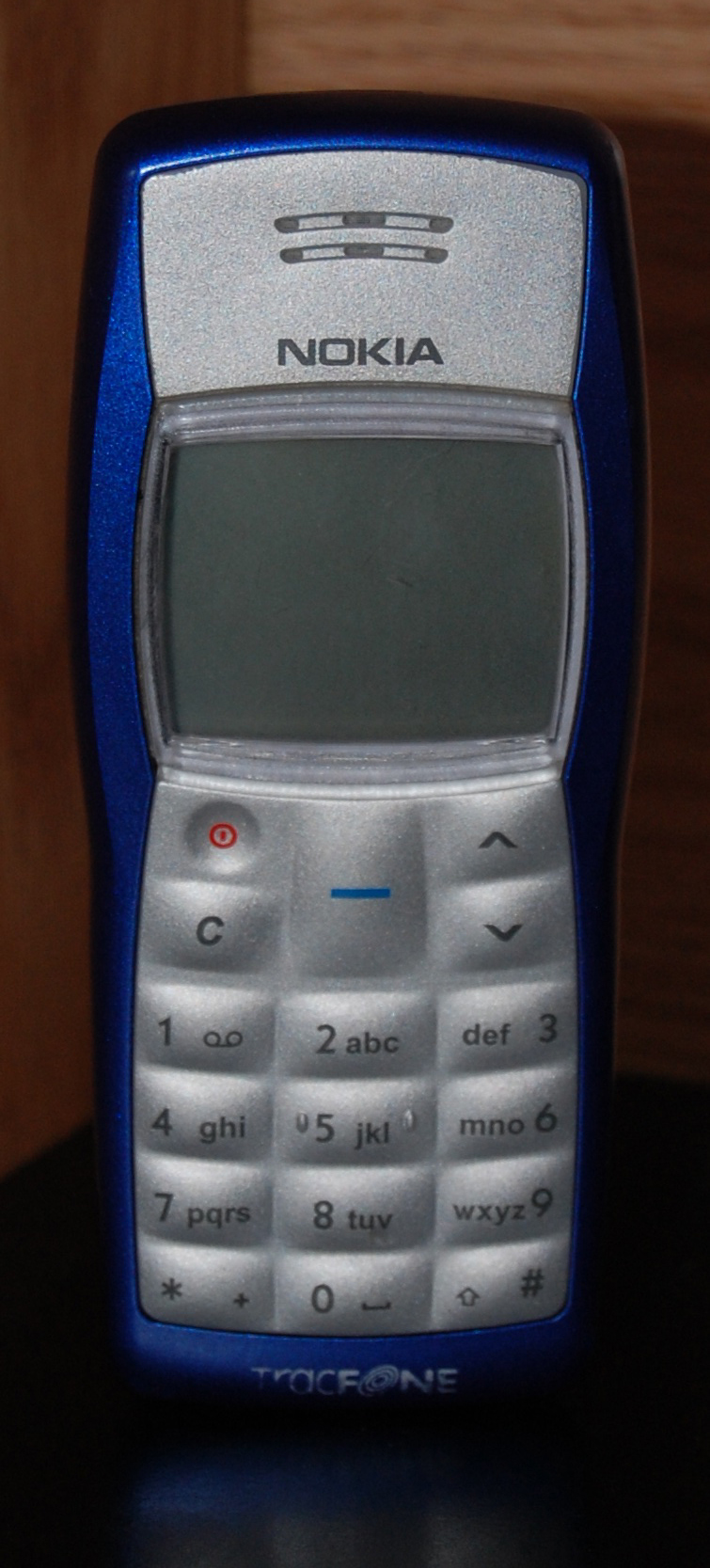
- Manufacturer: Nokia
- First released: 2003; 23 years ago
- Discontinued: 2010
- Predecessor: Nokia 3310
- Successor: Nokia 1110
- Related: Nokia 2300
- Compatible networks: GSM 900/1800
- Form factor: Bar
- Dimensions: 106 mm (4.2 in) H 46 mm (1.8 in) W 20 mm (0.79 in) D
- Weight: 86 g (3.0 oz)
- Operating system: Series 30
- CPU: UPP2M, ARM7
- Memory: 256 KB SRAM
- Storage: 2 MB
- SIM: miniSIM
- Battery: Nokia BL-5C, 850 mAh, 3.7 V user replaceable Li-ion
- Charging: Nokia 3.5-mm DC Charging Interface
- Display: 1.35 in (34 mm) diagonal STN LCD; 96 × 65 px
- Sound: Mono speaker, 2.5mm stereo audio jack
- Data inputs: Keypad
- Made in: Finland: Espoo Germany: Bochum; China: Dongguan; Mexico: Reynosa (1100b, 1108b); Hungary: Komárom; Brazil: Manaus (1100b) South Korea: Masan (1100b)
- Other: Flashlight

The Nokia 1100 (and closely related variants, the Nokia 1101 and the Nokia 1108) is a basic GSM mobile phone produced by Nokia. Over 250 million 1100s have been sold since its launch in Q4 2003, making it the world's best selling phone handset and the best selling consumer electronics device in the world at the time. The model was announced on 27 August 2003 and was discontinued in Q1 2010. The 1100 was the last Nokia model to feature monophonic playback of ringtones, after the luxury 8910i, which was discontinued in 2007.

The Nokia 1100 was the company's cheapest mobile phone when it was released to the market. It runs on a stripped-down version of Series 30 with a single soft key and a feature set is similar to the previous 5110/3210/3310 models that were among the most popular mobile phones in the world during their time, before handsets developed several new features such as cameras, polyphonic ringtones and colour screens. The simplicity and low cost made it ideal in developing countries and users who do not require advanced features beyond making calls and SMS text messages, alarm clock, reminders, etc.

The Nokia 1100 case was designed at Nokia Design Center in California, and patented for the US by the Bulgarian-American designer Dimitre Mehandjiysky. The software was adapted and ported to the DCT4 platform at Nokia Copenhagen, Denmark by members of the S30 group.

Sales of the 1100 and its variants hit 200 million by August 2007. In 2008, it reached the milestone of 250 million units sold, becoming the best-selling mobile phone of all time. Nokia's one billionth phone sold was a Nokia 1100 purchased in Nigeria in 2005.

In early 2009, it was in the news due to a firmware flaw in a batch of phones that were manufactured in a plant in Bochum, Germany. The phone could supposedly be programmed to receive messages directed to a different phone number, thus receiving sensitive data such as online banking details. This flaw was brought to authorities' attention after some phones were sold for over US$32,000.

== Features ==
- The 1100 features a built-in flashlight, activated by pressing and holding the C key once, or by pressing it twice to lock it on when the keypad is unlocked. It can also be accessed via a menu item.
- The 1100 and 1101 are the last Nokia phones to use monophonic ringtones, which can be selected from a list of 36 pre-installed tones or from 7 self-composed ones.
- It features Nokia's traditional-style navigational keypad, which uses a single button to connect and end calls, bi-directional keys and vibrating alert.
- The Cingular-branded version features a built-in AOL Instant Messenger client.
- The 1100 is compatible with Nokia's Xpress-On covers (including matching battery compartments). In addition to the default light blue, orange or black, there are also dark blue, yellow, red, green and pink versions offered by Nokia, as well as many 3rd-party covers.
- It has been specifically designed for developing countries: its keypad and front face have been designed to be as dustproof as possible, and its sides are non-slip for humid weather.
- Other features include a 50-message capacity (inbox and drafts, with 25 messages in the sent items folder), alarm, stopwatch, calculator, 6 profiles, contacts storage (capacity 50, with the ability to assign different tones and icons to different contacts), games (Snake II and Space Impact+) and the ability to compose your own ringtones.
- The User Interface also known as the Navi-Key User Interface was invented by Christian Lindholm, and described in: Mobile Usability: How Nokia Changed the face of the Mobile Phone. McGraw-Hill 2003. It featured in more than 750M Nokia phones.

== Variants ==
There are four distinct variations within the series: the 1100a, 1100b, 1101 and the 1108. They differ as follows:

- The 1100a operates on the GSM-900/1800 network.
- The 1100b operates on the GSM-850/1900 network.
- The 1101 replaces the green backlighting with a white backlighting and adds a simple WAP 1.1 browser.
- The 1108 also replaces the green backlighting with a white backlighting. Mainly made for Asian markets.

== Firmware history ==
The phone's firmware version can be checked by dialling *#0000#.

1100 RH-18 model:
Version	Build date
3.31	13 October 2003
3.44	6 November 2003
3.45	18 November 2003
4.15	15 December 2003
4.25	20 February 2004
4.35	26 March 2004
5.6	14 July 2004
5.62	25 October 2004
6.64	8 April 2005
7.34	20 October 2005
7.36	21 November 2005
8.11	19 June 2006

== Use ==
The phone uses a GSM method of activation via a SIM card. The Nokia BL-5C battery has a long standby and talk time – this battery is used in more advanced models that have increased power needs for their features, but in the basic 1100 it consumes a fraction of the power and therefore lasts for up to 400 hours between charges. The phone is offered for use with a wide range of mobile phone networks.

== Competitors ==
It competed against other super low-cost handsets such as Motorola C115 and Siemens A55.

== See also ==
- Nokia
- List of Nokia products
- List of best-selling mobile phones
