= Sony Ericsson K300 =

Mobile phone

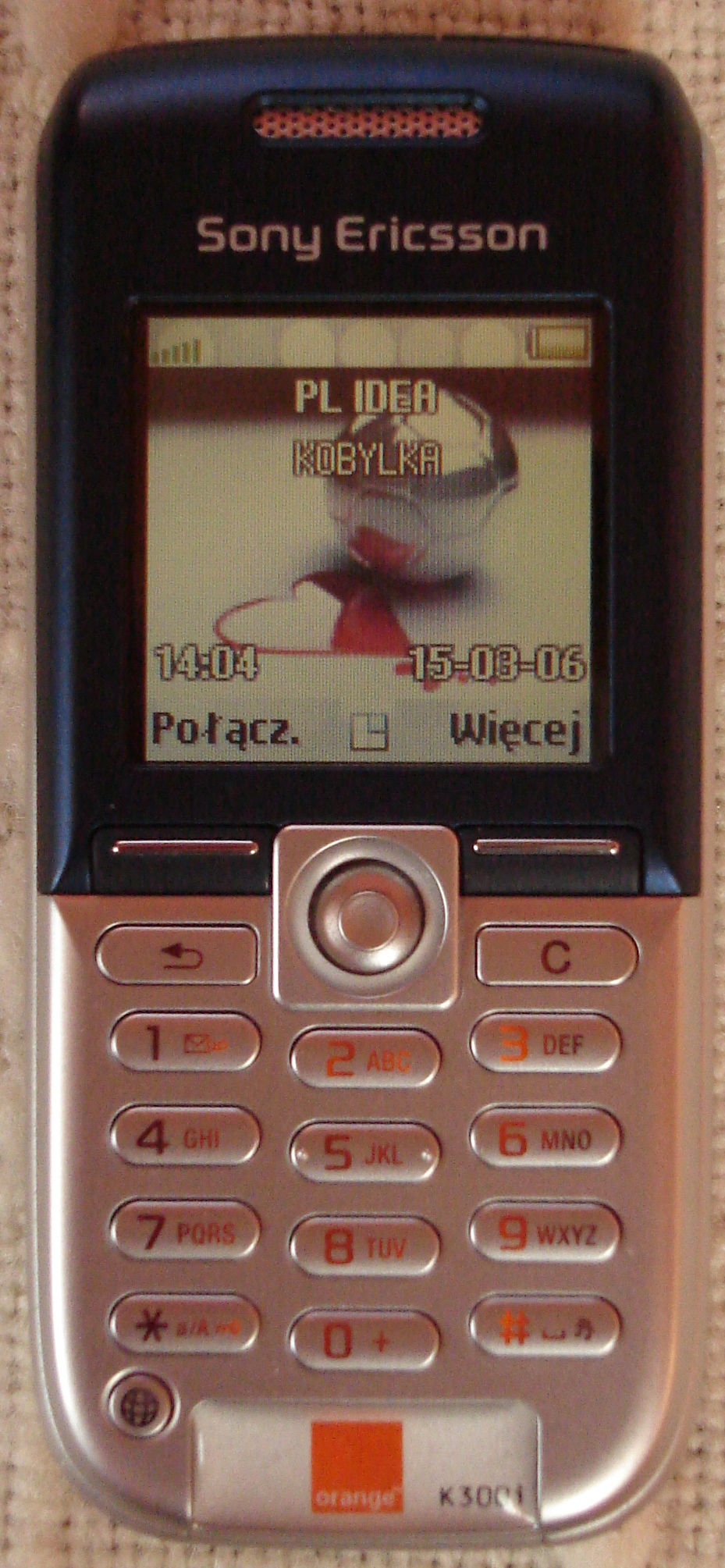
- Compatible networks: GSM 900, GSM 1800, GSM 1900
- Form factor: Candy bar
- Dimensions: 99.9×45.2×19.4 mm (3.93×1.78×0.76 in)
- Weight: 83 g (3 oz)
- Memory: 12MB Internal Memory
- Rear camera: 0.3 MP VGA
- Display: 128x128 pixels, 65,536 Colour STN LCD
- Sound: Polyphonic Sound 40 voices, Real tone (MP3)
- Connectivity: IrDA

The Sony Ericsson K300, released in March 2005 at the CTIA 2005 launch event, is a mobile phone manufactured by Sony Ericsson. It is a midrange phone containing all the features of a high-end phone, but with some drawbacks like STN screen, no Bluetooth, 12MB memory. It was well received at its launch in 2005 due to abundance of features at an attractively low price. It was also supported by Java MIDP 2.0 games.

== Design ==
The K300 is a candybar style phone that weighs 85 grams, with its buttons operated by the thumb. It has the 'dual-front' design common to most Sony Ericsson mobile phones since the T630. The K300 is available in two colours, Visual Blue and Smooth Silver. The central joystick button is used for selecting options and navigating menus, with the "C" button as an 'undo' or 'delete' button, and the arrow-labelled button as a 'return' or 'back' button. The two buttons labelled by silver horizontal lines, known as 'hotkeys' or 'soft keys' perform the function of making binary decisions, labelled on the phone's display.

The on/off button is located on the top of the phone next to the IrDA port. On the left-hand side of the phone there is a shutter button that operates the phone's VGA camera. The VGA camera is situated on the back side of the phone.

The camera can take photographs at three resolutions (640x480, 320x240 and 160x120). The camera also has the ability to capture video clips at 176x144 (QCIF) and 128x96 (SQCIF) resolutions and store them as .3GP files.

== Variants ==
- K300a: GSM 850, GSM 1800, GSM 1900
- K300c: GSM 900, GSM 1800, GSM 1900
- K300i: GSM 900, GSM 1800, GSM 1900
