= Nokia 2650 =

2004 cell phone model

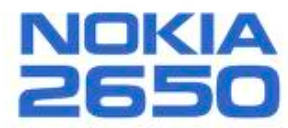

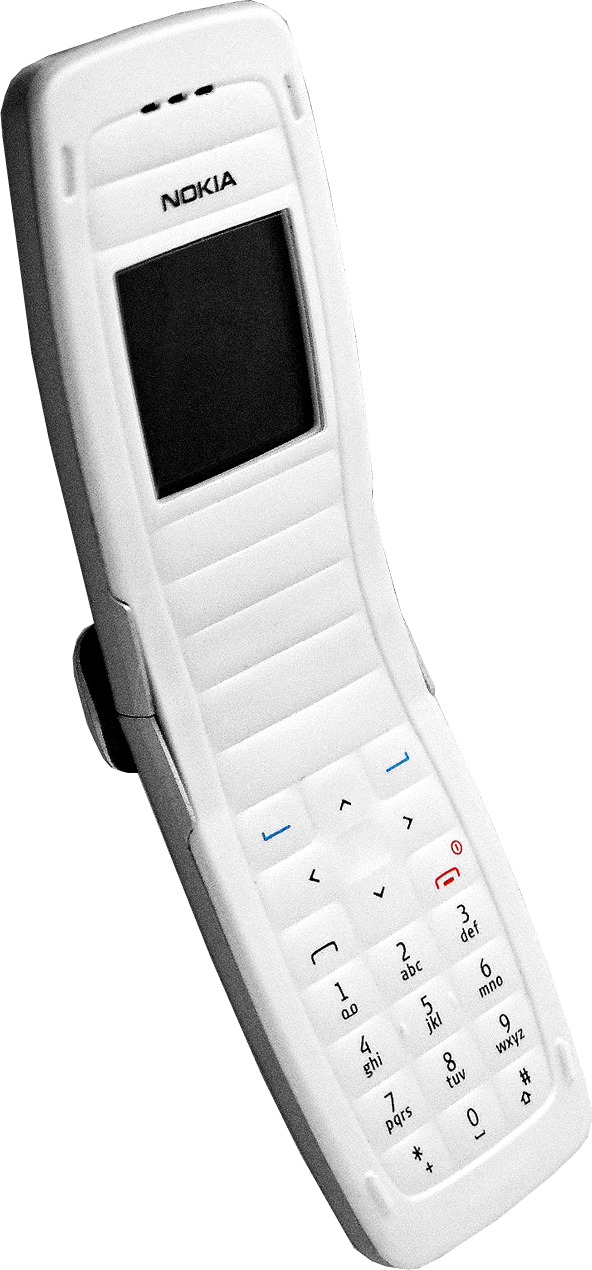
- Manufacturer: Nokia
- Availability by region: 2004
- Units sold: 35 million
- Units shipped: 1 million
- Compatible networks: GSM 850 1900; GSM 900 1800; GPRS Class 4 (3+1 slots), 24 - 36 kbit/s
- Form factor: Clamshell
- Operating system: Series 40
- Memory: 977 KB
- Battery: BL-4C; 760 mAh; Li-Ion
- Display: CSTN; 128x128 px 4096 colors

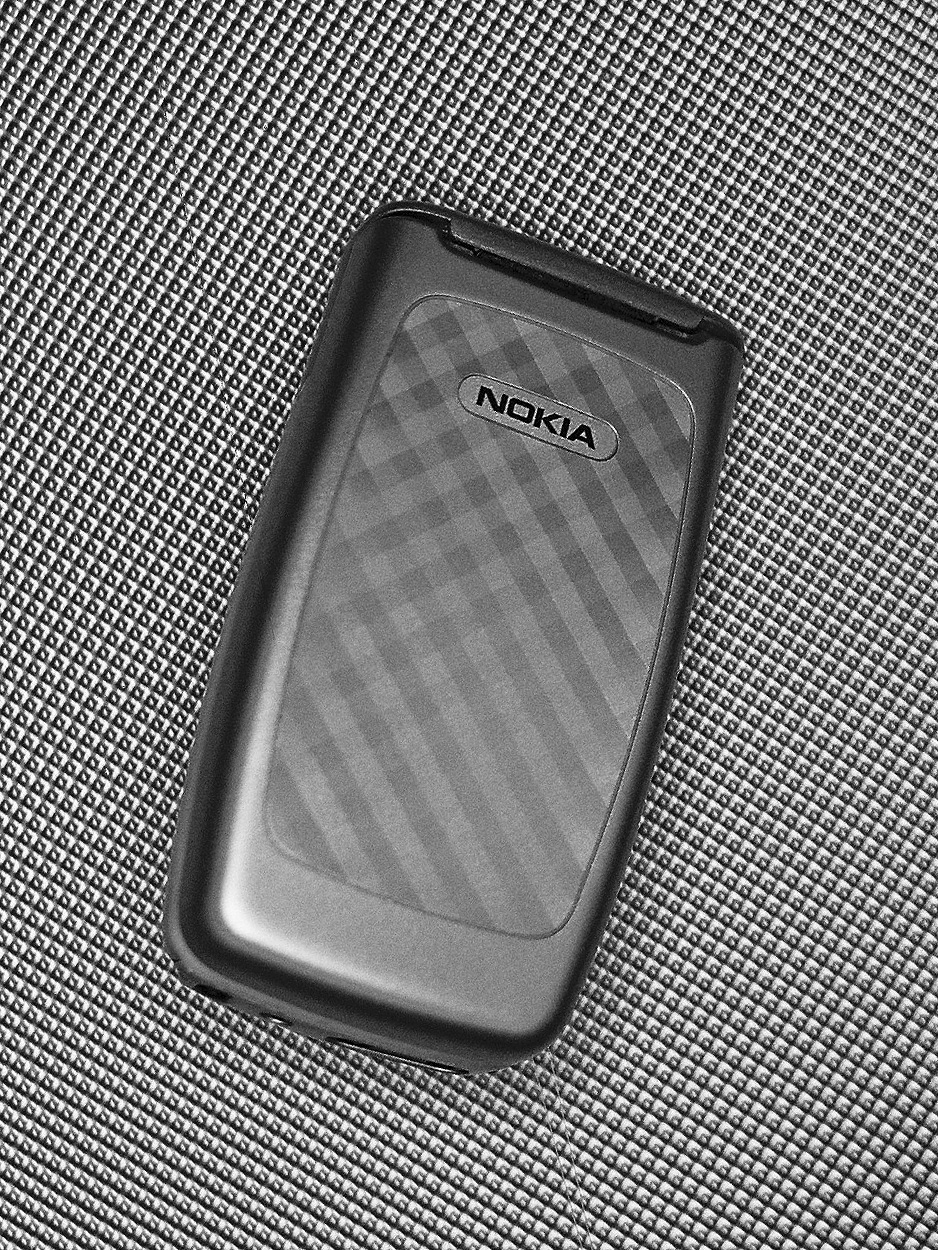
Nokia 2650, closed

The Nokia 2650 was first made public in the second quarter of 2004. The model was one of Nokia's few clamshell releases at that time, and being an entry-level phone, it became popular largely due to its low price.

== Features ==
The Nokia 2650 has the following features:

- LED light to alert for SMS and incoming calls
- A 128 x 128 color display
- Full colour xHTML via GPRS
- Multimedia Messaging
- An enhanced phone book with images added to contacts available
- An enhanced calendar function
- Downloadable Java games and applications, Wallpapers, Polyphonic ringtones

== Specification sheet ==
Feature	Specification
Form factor	Clamshell
Operating System	Series 40 Version 1
GSM frequencies	850/1900 MHz or 900/1800 MHz
GPRS	Class 4 (3+1 slots), 24 - 36 kbit/s
EDGE (EGPRS)	None
UMTS/WCDMA (3G)	None
Main screen	CSTN Matrix,4096 colors, 128 x 128 pixels
Camera	No
Video recording	No
Multimedia Messaging	Yes
Video calls	No
Push to Talk over Cellular (PoC)	No
Java support	Yes, MIDP 1.0, CLDC 1.0
Built-in memory	977KB
Memory card slot	No
Bluetooth	No
Infrared	No
Data cable support	No
Browser	WAP 1.2.1 XHTML
Email	No
Music player	Non
Radio	No
Video Player	No
Polyphonic tones	Yes, 4 channels, monophonic
MP3 ringtones	No
HF speakerphone	No
Offline mode	No
Battery	Li-Ion 760 mAh (BL-4C)
Talk time	3 Hours
Standby time	12+ days (300 hours)
Weight	96 grams
Dimensions	85 x 46 x 23 mm, 77 cc
Availability	Q2 2004
