= Samsung SGH-E700 =

Discontinued mobile phone

- Manufacturer: Samsung
- Series: Samsung SGH-EXXX series
- Predecessor: Samsung SGH-E600
- Successor: Samsung SGH-E720
- Compatible networks: GSM 900/1800 (dual-band)
- Form factor: clamshell
- Dimensions: 87×45×23 mm (3.43×1.77×0.91 in)
- Weight: 3.31 oz (94 g)
- Operating system: Proprietary
- Memory: 9 MB
- Storage: 9 MB
- Battery: Lithium Ion 800 mAh
- Rear camera: VGA (640×480)
- Front camera: None
- Display: 160 x 128 TFT LCD
- External display: 96×64
- Connectivity: GPRS, WAP, EMS/MMS Java Support

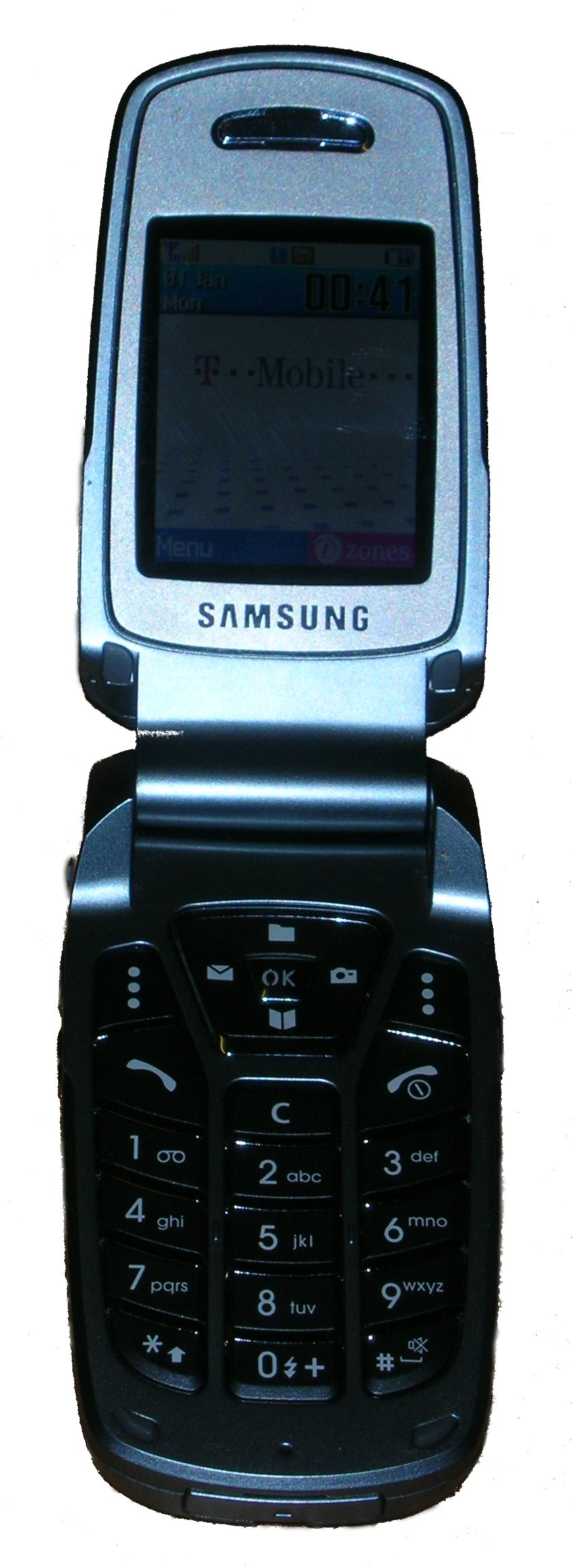
The Samsung SGH-E720, a model similar to the E700.

The SGH-E700 is a GSM mobile phone designed by Samsung Electronics, and their first internalized antenna phone. It was announced in August 2003 and became the firm's flagship handset at the time. The SGH-E700 had a slightly more rectangular look compared to other clamshell phones of the time. Because of its "elegant" design, the handset gained the affectionate nickname "Benz Phone".

The storage of the Samsung SGH-E700 holds 9 MB shared memory for pictures and MMS messages, 600 Kb for Java apps, and 200 short messages. The display (colour TFT) size is 1.8 inches and it has an external colour display as well. It has a VGA resolution camera.

A commercially popular handset during its time, more than 10 million units were sold.
