= Nokia 1600 =

Cell phone model

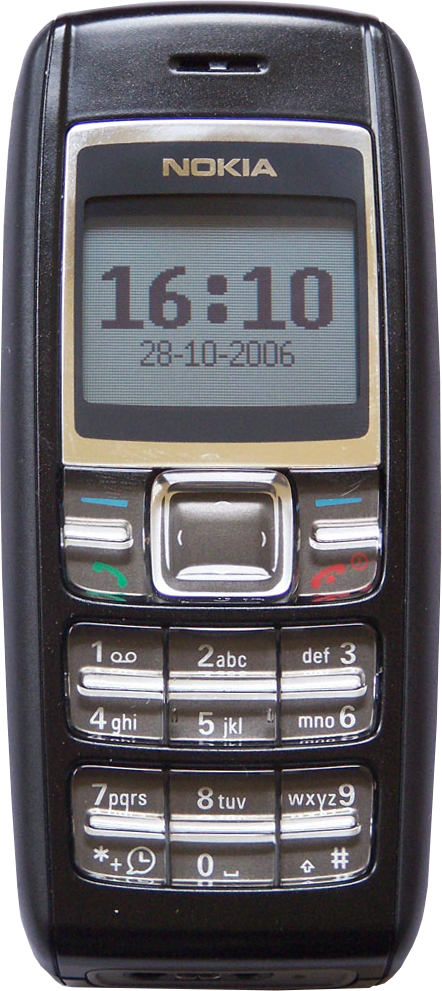
- Manufacturer: Nokia
- First released: May 2005
- Availability by region: June 2005
- Discontinued: Q1 2009
- Units sold: 130 million
- Successor: Nokia 1208; Nokia 1650
- Compatible networks: GSM-900/GSM-1800 or GSM-850/GSM-1900
- Form factor: candybar
- Dimensions: 104 × 45 × 17 mm (4.09 × 1.77 × 0.67 in)
- Weight: 85 g (3 oz)
- Operating system: Series 30 (2004–2013)
- System-on-chip: DCT4 platform, UPP2M (ARM7TDMI)
- Memory: 4MB; 200 phonebook entries
- Battery: Removable 3.7 V 970 mAh Li-Ion BL-5C: Standby: 450 hours; Talk time: 5 hours
- Display: 96×68 pixel CSTN LCD, 65,536 colors
- Sound: 20-voice polyphonic ringtones, ringtone composer. Speaking clock and alarm.
- Connectivity: Picture messaging
- Data inputs: Four-way scroll key, Alphanumeric keypad, 0-9 type predictive text input
- Other: Mini-SIM; Xpress-on covers; reminders, calculator

The Nokia 1600 is a part of Nokia's Ultrabasic series of mobile phones announced on 28 May 2005 along with the Nokia 1110, and released in June 2005. The 1600 is designed for prepaid mobile phone services and is related to Nokia 1110. It was originally released specifically to be used by customers in developing countries. The phone is noted for its durability and resilience to accidental drops. It sold 130 million units in its lifespan, making it one of the most successful phones to date.

== Additional features ==
Nokia 1600 has a speaking clock, which was a novel feature when the phone was launched in 2005. A user could use the speaking clock by pressing the asterisk button during the display of the home screen.

The device also includes a ringtone composer which allows creating custom ringtones. Pre-composed ringtones can be transferred through a data cable.

The phone menu features animated icons. There are fourteen pre-defined themes with fourteen wallpapers and menu backgrounds.

The phone has a basic calculator which can perform addition, subtraction, multiplication, and division.

== Games ==
The games available on the Nokia 1600 differ from country to country:

Game title\world region	Asia	Europe & Africa	Argentina	USA	Nokia 1110
Pocket Carrom	Yes				Yes
Soccer League	Yes	Yes	Yes		
Cricket Cup	Yes				Yes
Snake Xenzia		Yes			Yes
Rapid Roll		Yes	Yes	Yes	
Dice Games			Yes	Yes	Yes
Adventure Quiz				Yes	Yes
