= Nokia 1200 =

2007 cell phone model

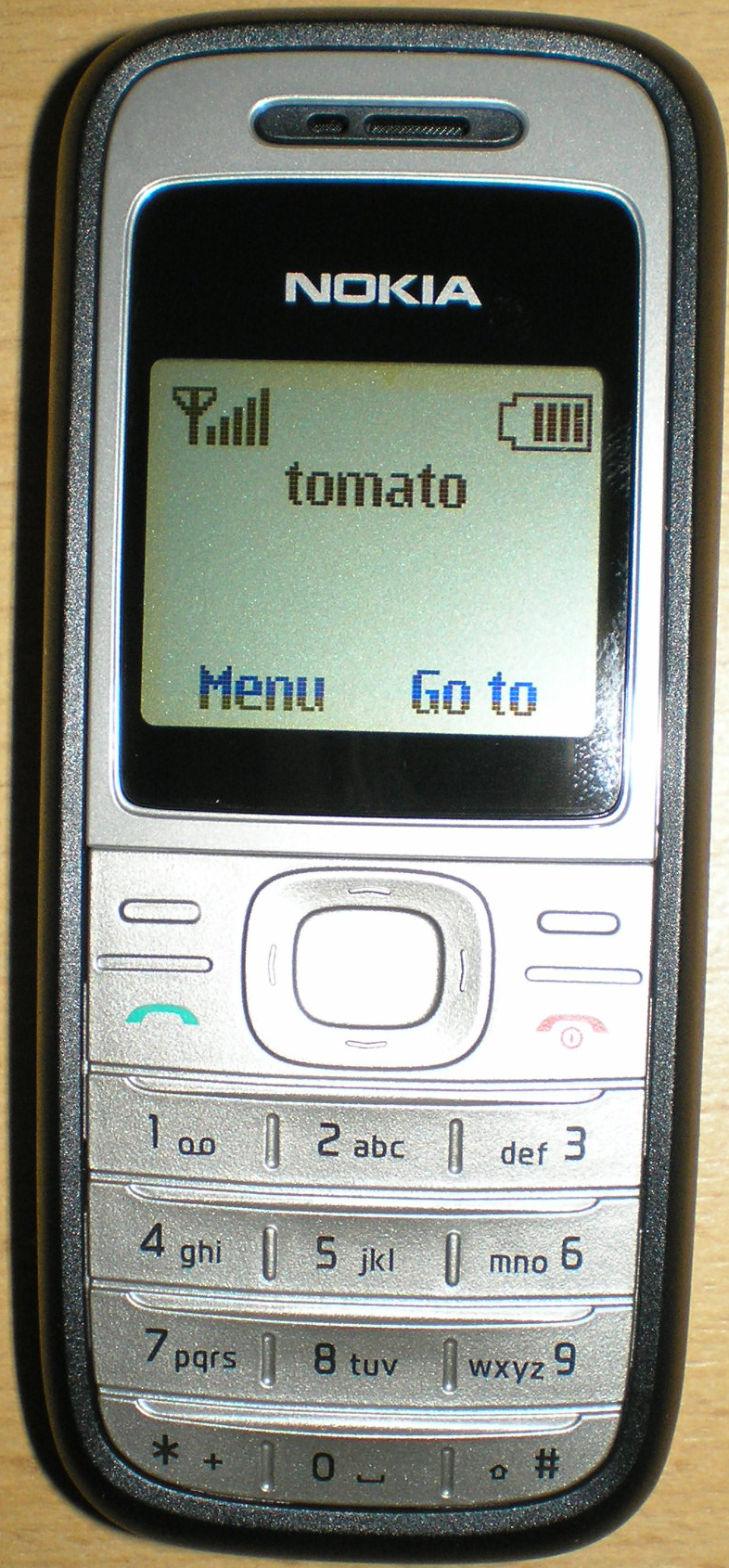
Nokia 1200

The Nokia 1200 is an entry-level GSM mobile phone developed by Nokia, announced on 2 May 2007 and released later that year.

The device was designed primarily for emerging markets such as Africa, India, and China, focusing on affordability and basic communication needs. It was priced at around €35 at launch and included features tailored for shared usage, such as multiple phonebooks and call-time tracking.

The phone features a monochrome display (96 × 68 pixels), a dust-resistant keypad, and an integrated flashlight. It offers up to 7 hours of talk time and up to 390 hours of standby time.

The Nokia 1200 became one of the best-selling mobile phones of all time, with over 150 million units sold worldwide.
