= History of Solidarity =

History of the Polish trade union

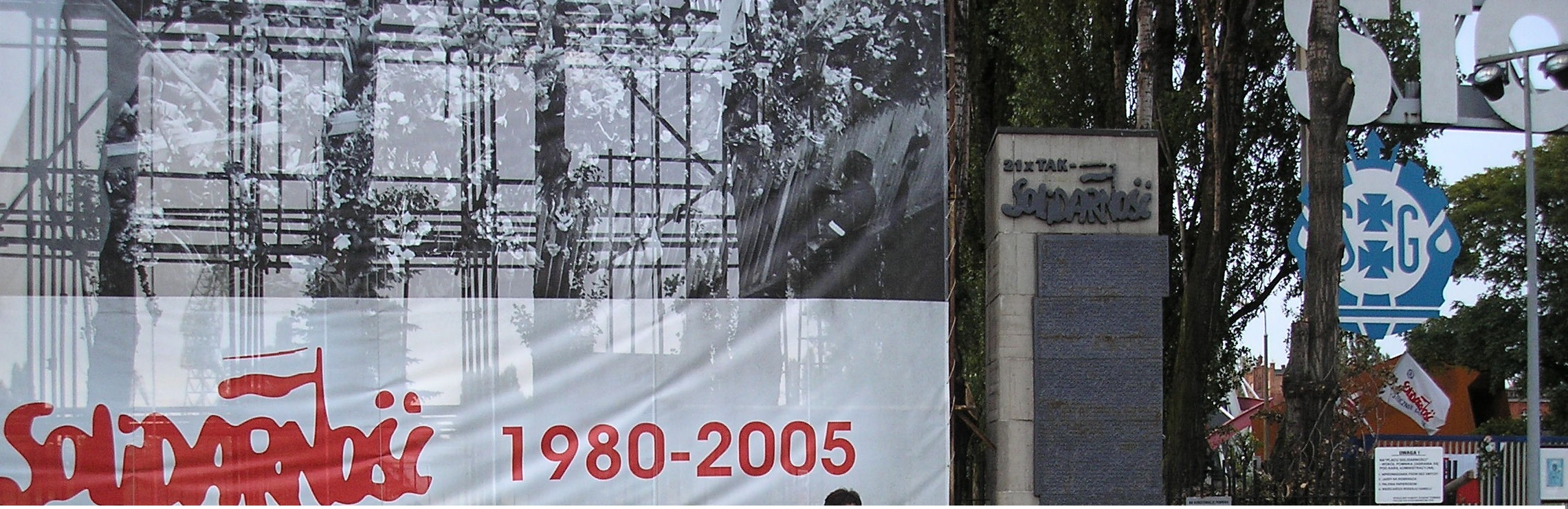
Gdańsk, 25th anniversary of Solidarity, summer 2005

Solidarity (Polish: „Solidarność”, pronounced [sɔliˈdarnɔɕt͡ɕ]), a Polish non-governmental trade union, was founded on August 14, 1980, at the Lenin Shipyards (now Gdańsk Shipyards) by Lech Wałęsa and others. In the early 1980s, it became the first independent labor union in an Eastern Bloc country. Solidarity gave rise to a broad, non-violent, anti-Communist social movement that, at its height, claimed some 9.4 million members. It is considered to have contributed greatly to the Revolutions of 1989.

The People's Republic of Poland attempted to destroy the union by instituting martial law on December 13 1981, followed by several years of political repression but in the end was forced into negotiation. The Roundtable Talks (February 6 to April 5 1989) between the Communist government and the Solidarity-led opposition resulted in semi-free elections of 1989. By the end of August 1989, a Solidarity-led coalition government had been formed, and Wałęsa was elected president in December 1990. This was soon followed by the dismantling of the Communist governmental system and by Poland's transformation into a modern democratic state. Solidarity's early survival represented a break in the hard-line stance of the Communist Polish United Workers' Party (PZPR), and was an unprecedented event; not only for the People's Republic of Poland — a satellite of the Soviet Union ruled by a one-party Communist state — but for the whole of the Eastern Bloc. Solidarity's example led to the spread of anti-Communist ideas and movements throughout the Eastern Bloc, weakening Communist governments. This process later culminated in the Revolutions of 1989.

In the 1990s, Solidarity's influence on politics of Poland waned. A political arm of the Solidarity movement, Solidarity Electoral Action (AWS), was founded in 1996 and would win the 1997 Polish parliamentary election, only to lose the subsequent 2001 Polish parliamentary election. Thereafter, Solidarity had little influence as a political party, though it became the largest trade union in Poland.

== Pre-1980 roots (1970s) ==
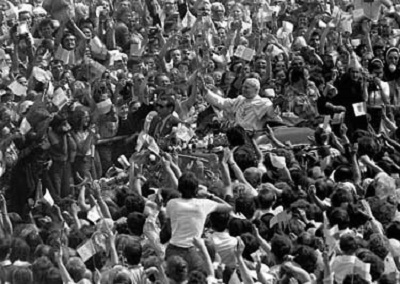
Millions cheered Pope John Paul II during his first visit to Poland as pontiff in 1979.

In the 1970s and 1980s, the initial success of Solidarity in particular, and of dissident movements in general, was fed by a deepening crisis within Soviet-influenced societies. There was declining morale and worsening economic conditions (a shortage economy). After a brief boom period, from 1975 the policies of the Polish government, led by Party First Secretary Edward Gierek, precipitated a slide into increasing depression, as foreign debt mounted. In June 1976, the first workers' strikes took place, involving violent incidents at factories in Płock, Radom and Ursus. When these incidents were quelled by the government, the worker's movement received support from intellectual dissidents, many of them associated with the Committee for Defense of the Workers (Polish: Komitet Obrony Robotników, abbreviated KOR), formed in 1976. The following year, KOR was renamed the Committee for Social Self-Defence (KSS-KOR).

On October 16, 1978, the Bishop of Kraków, Karol Wojtyła, was elected Pope John Paul II. A year later, during his first pilgrimage to Poland, his masses were attended by hundreds of thousands of his countrymen. The Pope called for the respecting of national and religious traditions and advocated for freedom and human rights, while denouncing violence. To many Poles, he represented a spiritual and moral force that could be set against brute material forces, he was a bellwether of change, and became an important symbol—and supporter—of changes to come.

== Early strikes (1980) ==
Strikes did not occur merely due to problems that had emerged shortly before the labor unrest, but due to governmental and economic difficulties spanning more than a decade. In July 1980, Edward Gierek's government, facing economic crisis, decided to raise prices while slowing the growth of wages. At once there ensued a wave of strikes and factory occupations, with the biggest strikes taking place in the area of Lublin. The first strike started on July 8, 1980 in the State Aviation Works in Świdnik. Although the strike movement had no coordinating center, the workers had developed an information network to spread news of their struggle. A "dissident" group, the Workers' Defence Committee (KOR), which had originally been set up in 1976 to organize aid for victimized workers, attracted small groups of working-class militants in major industrial centers. At the Lenin Shipyard in Gdańsk, the firing of Anna Walentynowicz, a popular crane operator and activist, galvanized the outraged workers into action.

On August 14, the shipyard workers began their strike, organized by the Free Trade Unions of the Coast (Wolne Związki Zawodowe Wybrzeża). The workers were led by electrician Lech Wałęsa, a former shipyard worker who had been dismissed in 1976, and who arrived at the shipyard late in the morning of August 14. The strike committee demanded the rehiring of Walentynowicz and Wałęsa, as well as the according of respect to workers' rights and other social concerns. In addition, they called for the raising of a monument to the shipyard workers who had been killed in 1970 and for the legalization of independent trade unions. The workers may have timed the strike to coincide with the nearby Intervision Song Contest, which many international journalists attended. On August 16, an agreement had been reached under which the government agreed to raise wages at the Lenin shipyard and reinstate several sacked workers, which the union agreed to accept in exchange for ending the occupation of the Lenin shipyard while the issue of free trade unions was left unresolved. When the agreement was announced, there was a grass-roots revolt led by several of the striking women workers who demanded the right to free trade unions being guaranteed as a number of strikes in the 1970s had been ended with similar agreements only for the state to renege later on.

The Polish government enforced censorship, and official media said little about the "sporadic labor disturbances in Gdańsk"; as a further precaution, all phone connections between the coast and the rest of Poland were soon cut. Nonetheless, the government failed to contain the information: a spreading wave of samizdats (Polish: bibuła), including Robotnik (The Worker), and grapevine gossip, along with Radio Free Europe broadcasts that penetrated the Iron Curtain, ensured that the ideas of the emerging Solidarity movement quickly spread. The strike attracted immense media attention in the West and Western journalists swarmed into Poland to cover the crisis.

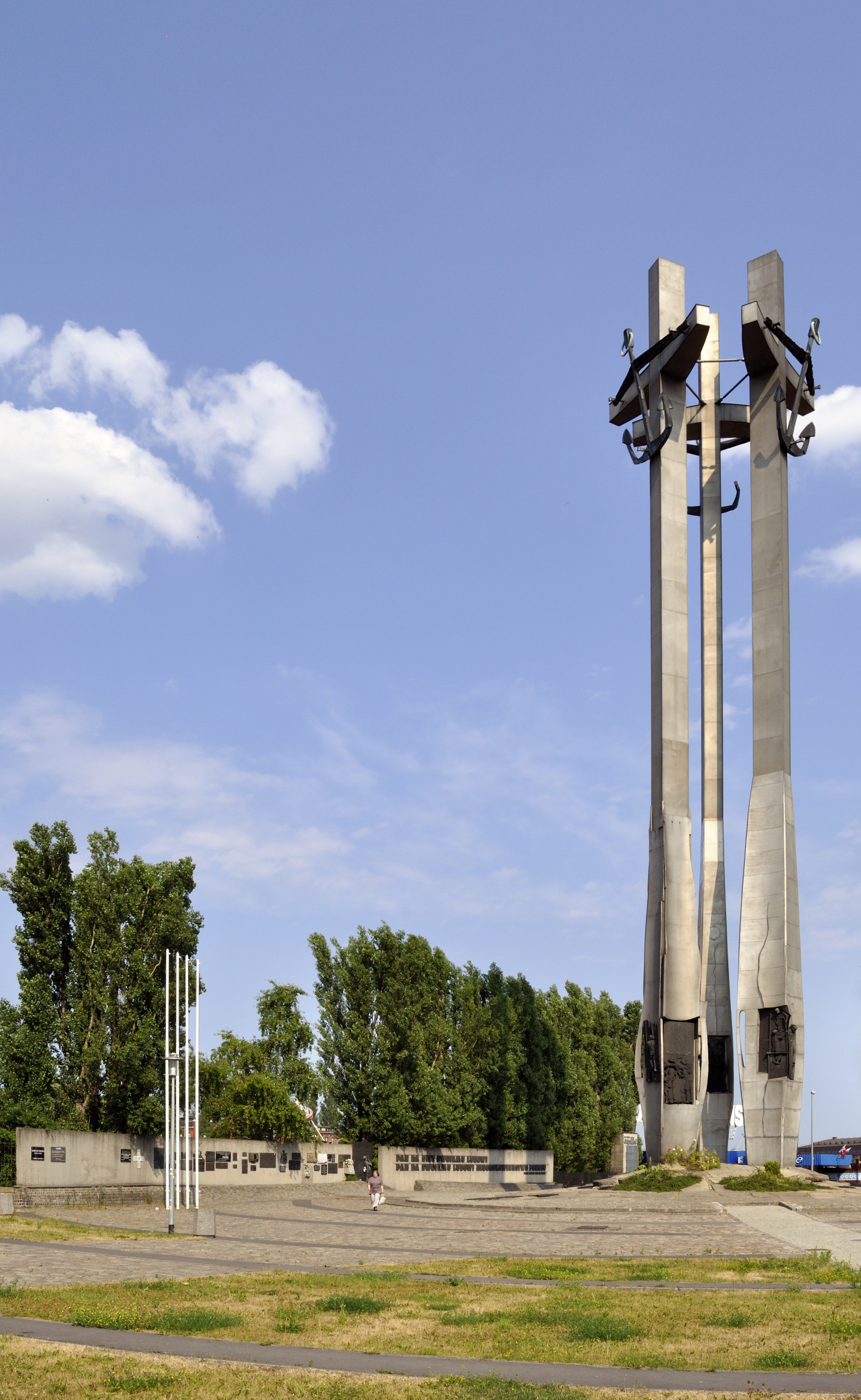
Monument to Shipyard Workers Fallen in 1970, created following the Gdańsk Agreement, and unveiled December 16, 1980

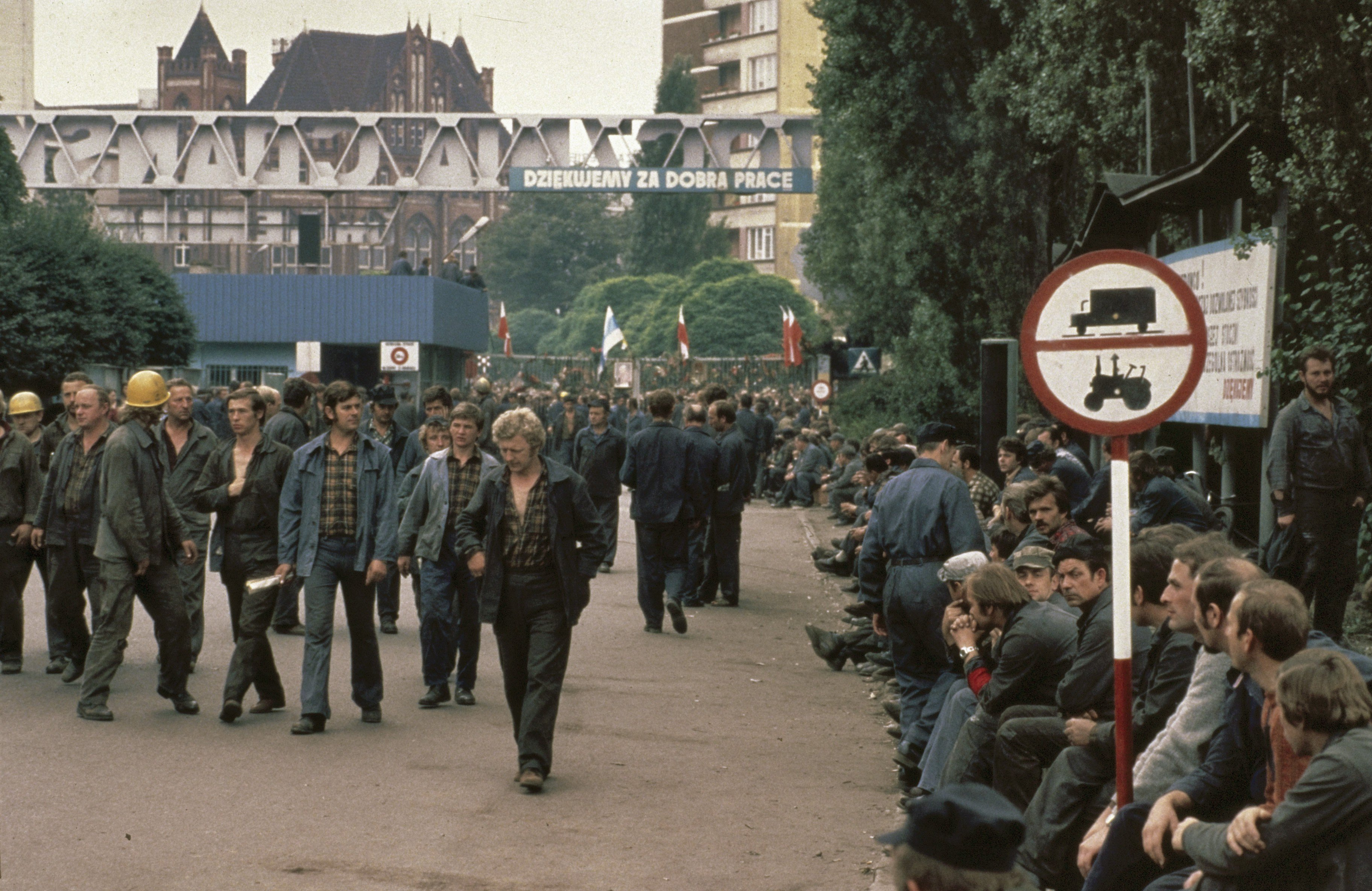
Strikers waiting in front of the Lenin Shipyard

On August 16, delegations from other strike committees arrived at the shipyard. Delegates (Bogdan Lis, Andrzej Gwiazda and others) together with shipyard strikers agreed to create an Inter-Enterprise Strike Committee (Międzyzakładowy Komitet Strajkowy, or MKS). On August 17 a priest, Henryk Jankowski, performed a mass outside the shipyard's gate under a Polish flag, at which 21 demands of the MKS were put forward. The list went beyond purely local matters, beginning with a demand for new, independent trade unions and going on to call for a relaxation of the censorship, a right to strike, new rights for the Church, the freeing of political prisoners, and improvements in the national health service. The crisis in Gdańsk was considered sufficiently serious that Edward Gierek hastily ended his vacation in the Crimea to head back to Warsaw.

On August 22 1980, a delegation of KOR intelligentsia, including Tadeusz Mazowiecki, left Warsaw and made their way past roadblocks to arrive in Gdańsk to offer their assistance with negotiations. A bibuła news-sheet, Solidarność, produced on the shipyard's printing press with KOR assistance, reached a daily print run of 30,000 copies. Meanwhile, Jacek Kaczmarski's protest song, Mury (Walls), gained popularity with the workers.

On August 18, the Szczecin Shipyard joined the strike, under the leadership of Marian Jurczyk. A tidal wave of strikes swept the coast, closing ports and bringing the economy to a halt. With KOR assistance and support from many intellectuals, workers occupying factories, mines and shipyards across Poland joined forces. Within days, over 200 factories and enterprises had joined the strike committee. By August 21, most of Poland was affected by the strikes, from coastal shipyards to the mines of the Upper Silesian Industrial Area (in Upper Silesia, the city of Jastrzębie-Zdrój became center of the strikes, with a separate committee organized there, see Jastrzębie-Zdrój 1980 strikes). More and more new unions were formed, and joined the federation. In September 1980 in Prudnik, over 1500 workers of ZPB "Frotex" along with other factories and firefighters from Prudnik's fire brigade went on the biggest anti-Communist strike in Opole Voivodeship.

Thanks to popular support within Poland, as well as to international support and media coverage, the Gdańsk workers held out until the government gave in to their demands. On August 21 a Governmental Commission (Komisja Rządowa) including Mieczysław Jagielski arrived in Gdańsk, and another one with Kazimierz Barcikowski was dispatched to Szczecin. On August 30 and 31, and on September 3, representatives of the workers and the government signed an agreement ratifying many of the workers' demands, including the right to strike. This agreement came to be known as the August or Gdańsk agreement (Porozumienia sierpniowe). Other agreements were signed in Szczecin (the Szczecin Agreement of August 30), and Jastrzębie-Zdrój on September 3. It was called the Jastrzębie Agreement (Porozumienia jastrzebskie) and as such is regarded as part of the Gdańsk agreement. Though concerned with labor-union matters, the agreement enabled citizens to introduce democratic changes within the Communist political structure and was regarded as a first step toward dismantling the Party's monopoly of power. The workers' main concerns were the establishment of a labor union independent of Communist-party control, and recognition of a legal right to strike. Workers' needs would now receive clear representation. Another consequence of the Gdańsk Agreement was the replacement, in September 1980, of Edward Gierek by Stanisław Kania as Party First Secretary.

== First Solidarity (1980–1981) ==
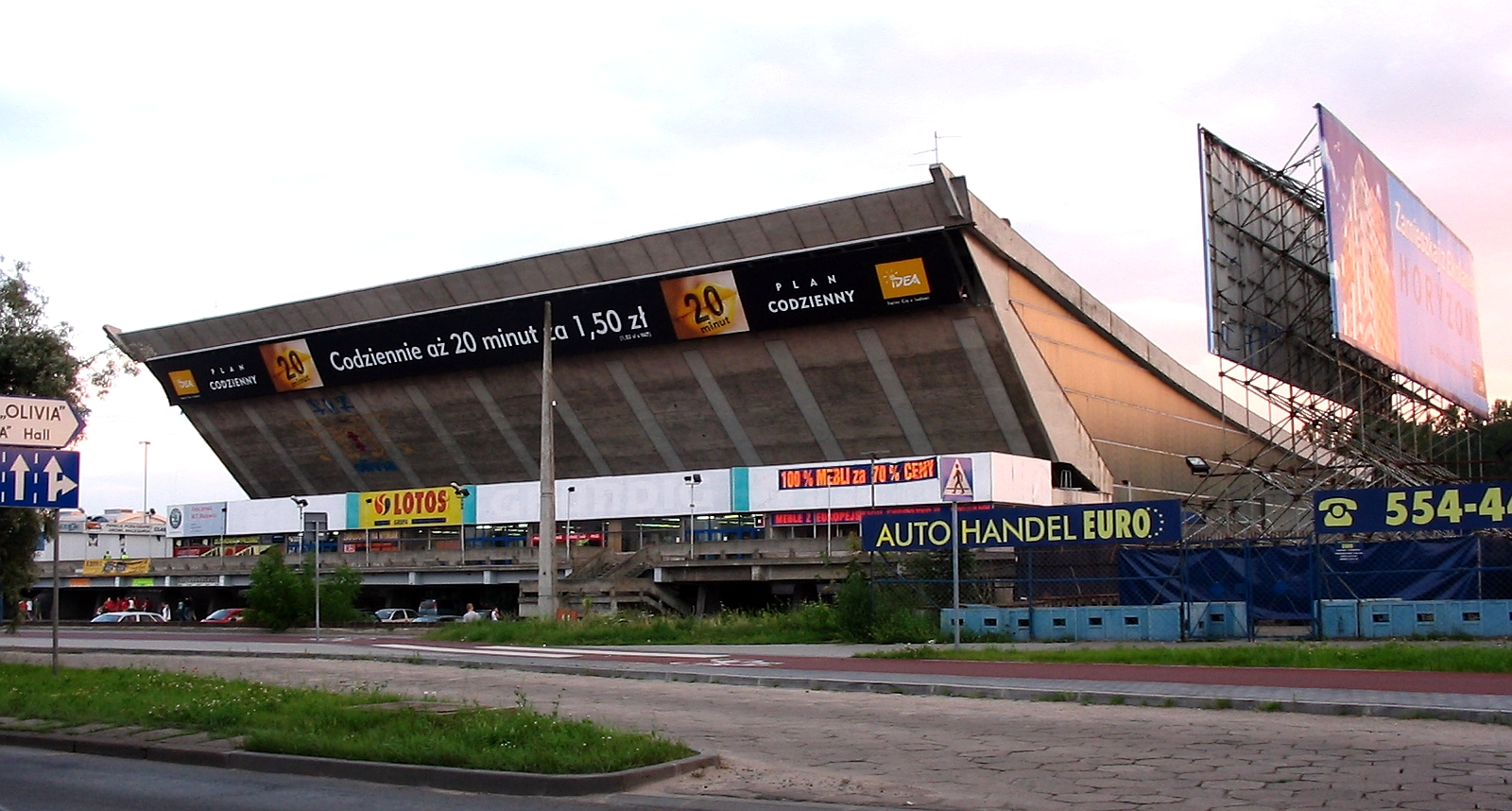
Hala Olivia, Gdańsk. The place where the first national Congress was held.

Encouraged by the success of the August strikes, on September 17 workers' representatives, including Lech Wałęsa, formed a nationwide labor union, Solidarity (Niezależny Samorządny Związek Zawodowy (NSZZ) "Solidarność"). It was the first independent labor union in a Soviet-bloc country. Its name was suggested by Karol Modzelewski, and its famous logo was conceived by Jerzy Janiszewski, designer of many Solidarity-related posters. The new union's supreme powers were vested in a legislative body, the Convention of Delegates (Zjazd Delegatów). The executive branch was the National Coordinating Commission (Krajowa Komisja Porozumiewawcza), later renamed the National Commission (Komisja Krajowa). The Union had a regional structure, comprising 38 regions (region) and two districts (okręg). On December 16, 1980, the Monument to Fallen Shipyard Workers was unveiled in Gdańsk, and on June 28, 1981, another monument was unveiled in Poznan, which commemorated the Poznań 1956 protests. On January 15, 1981, a Solidarity delegation, including Lech Wałęsa, met in Rome with Pope John Paul II. From September 5 to 10, and from September 26 to October 7, Solidarity's first national congress was held in Hala Olivia, Gdańsk, and Lech Wałęsa was elected its president. The last accord of the congress was the adoption of the republican program "Self-governing Republic".

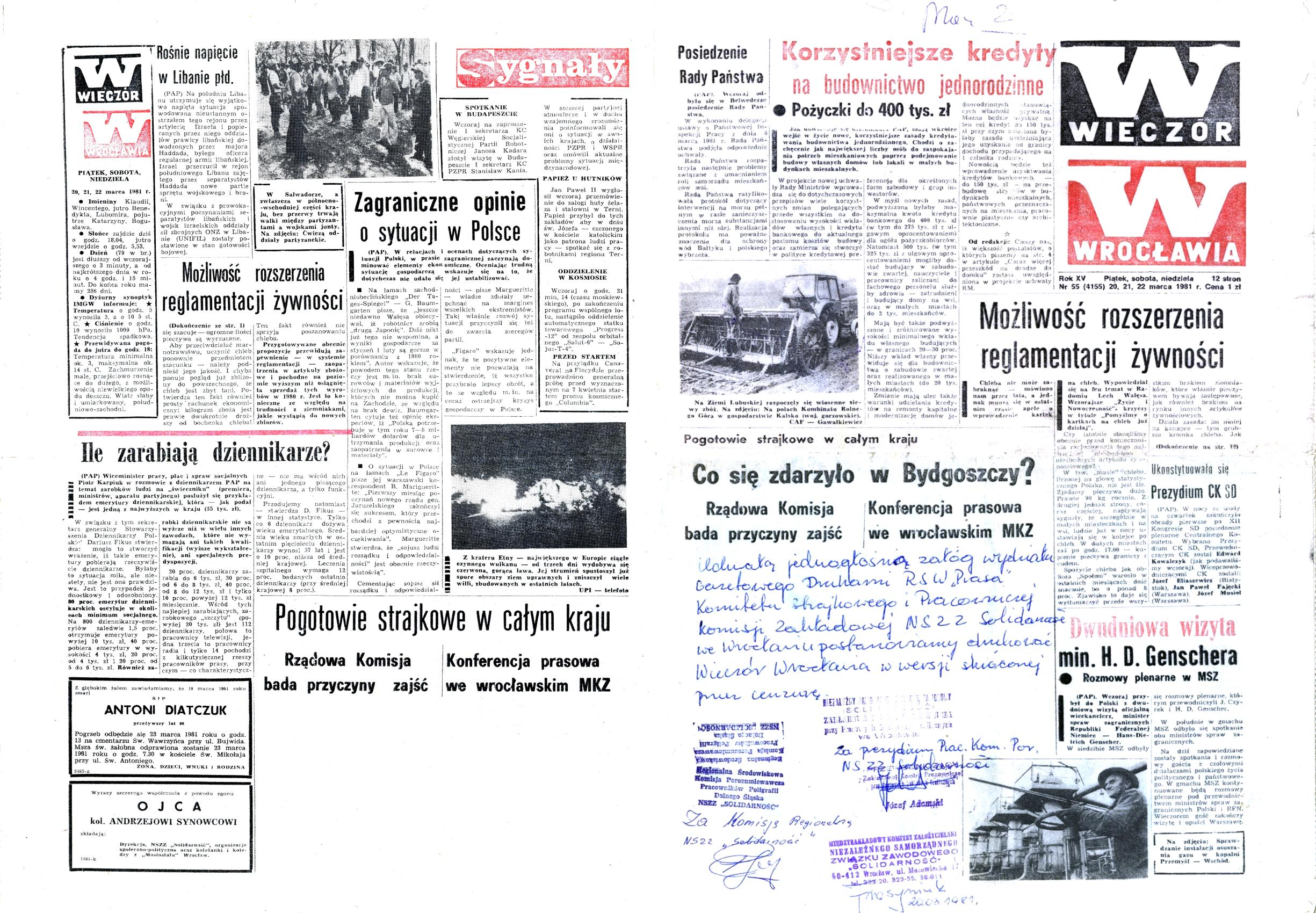
March 20–21, 1981, issue of Wieczór Wrocławia (The Wrocław Evening). Blank spaces remain after the government censor has pulled articles from page 1 (right, "What happened at Bydgoszcz?") and from the last page (left, "Country-wide strike alert"), leaving only their titles. The printers—Solidarity-trade-union members—have decided to run the newspaper as is, with blank spaces intact. The bottom of page 1 of this master copy bears the hand-written Solidarity confirmation of that decision.

Meanwhile, Solidarity had been transforming itself from a trade union into a social movement or more specifically, a revolutionary movement. Over the 500 days following the Gdańsk Agreement, 9–10 million workers, intellectuals and students joined it or its suborganizations, such as the Independent Student Union (Niezależne Zrzeszenie Studentów, created in September 1980), the Independent Farmers' Trade Union (NSZZ Rolników Indywidualnych "Solidarność" or Rural Solidarity, created in May 1981) and the Independent Craftsmen's Trade Union. It was the only time in recorded history that a quarter of a country's population (some 80% of the total Polish work force) had voluntarily joined a single organization. "History has taught us that there is no bread without freedom," the Solidarity program stated a year later. "What we had in mind was not only bread, butter and sausages, but also justice, democracy, truth, legality, human dignity, freedom of convictions, and the repair of the republic." Tygodnik Solidarność, a Solidarity-published newspaper, was started in April 1981.

Though opposed to the Communist government, Solidarity in its early years did not call for the replacement of the Communist economic system with capitalism. Most Solidarity members in the early 1980s were opposed to aspects of the Communist system such as corruption and inefficiency, and most notably called for more spending on health care, improved working conditions, and greater maternity leave. Solidarity was motivated by a strong sense of Polish nationalism and the Polish historian Anita Prażmowska noted: "...Polish workers who fought for free trade unions did so because they identified only with other Polish workers. They had no aspirations either to encourage or to speak on behalf of other workers, not even those in other Communist countries. Absent was any sense of internationalism, even though the Solidarity movement received support from international trade unions and workers' organisations. This was a very Polish organisation...". Both Erich Honecker of East Germany and Gustáv Husák of Czechoslovakia favored military intervention to crush Solidarity, but Leonid Brezhnev in Moscow wavered about what to do. Plans were drawn up in Moscow for an invasion of Poland, but were never considered to be a serious option. The Soviet Union was already involved in a guerrilla war in Afghanistan and it was widely believed in Moscow that an invasion would lead to another Afghan-type guerrilla war in Poland. Finally, a stagnating economy burdened by a heavy foreign debt load along with low oil prices led to a consensus in Moscow that the Soviet Union could literally not afford the Western sanctions that would be likely to result if Poland was invaded.

Using strikes and other protest actions, Solidarity sought to force a change in government policies. In some cases, as in Bielsko-Biała, Solidarity managed to force corrupt officials of the government to lose their jobs. At the same time, it was careful never to use force or violence, so as to avoid giving the government any excuse to bring security forces into play. After 27 Bydgoszcz Solidarity members, including Jan Rulewski, were beaten up on March 19, a four-hour warning strike on March 27, involving around twelve million people, paralyzed the country. This was the largest strike in the history of the Eastern bloc, and it forced the government to promise an investigation into the beatings. This concession, and Wałęsa's agreement to defer further strikes, proved a setback to the movement, as the euphoria that had swept Polish society subsided. Nonetheless the Polish Communist party—the Polish United Workers' Party (PZPR)—had lost its total control over society.

Yet while Solidarity was ready to take up negotiations with the government, the Polish Communists were unsure what to do, as they issued empty declarations and bided their time. Against the background of a deteriorating Communist shortage economy and unwillingness to negotiate seriously with Solidarity, it became increasingly clear that the Communist government would eventually have to suppress the Solidarity movement as the only way out of the impasse, or face a truly revolutionary situation. The atmosphere was increasingly tense, with various local chapters conducting a growing number of uncoordinated strikes as well as street protests, such as the Summer 1981 hunger demonstrations in Poland, in response to the worsening economic situation. On December 3, 1981, Solidarity announced that a 24-hour strike would be held if the government were granted additional powers to suppress dissent, and that a general strike would be declared if those powers were used.

== Martial law (1981–1983) ==
After the Gdańsk Agreement, the Polish government was under increasing pressure from the Soviet Union to take action and strengthen its position. Stanisław Kania was viewed by Moscow as too independent, and on October 18, 1981, the Party Central Committee put him in the minority. Kania lost his post as First Secretary, and was replaced by Prime Minister (and Minister of Defence) Gen. Wojciech Jaruzelski, who adopted a strong-arm policy.

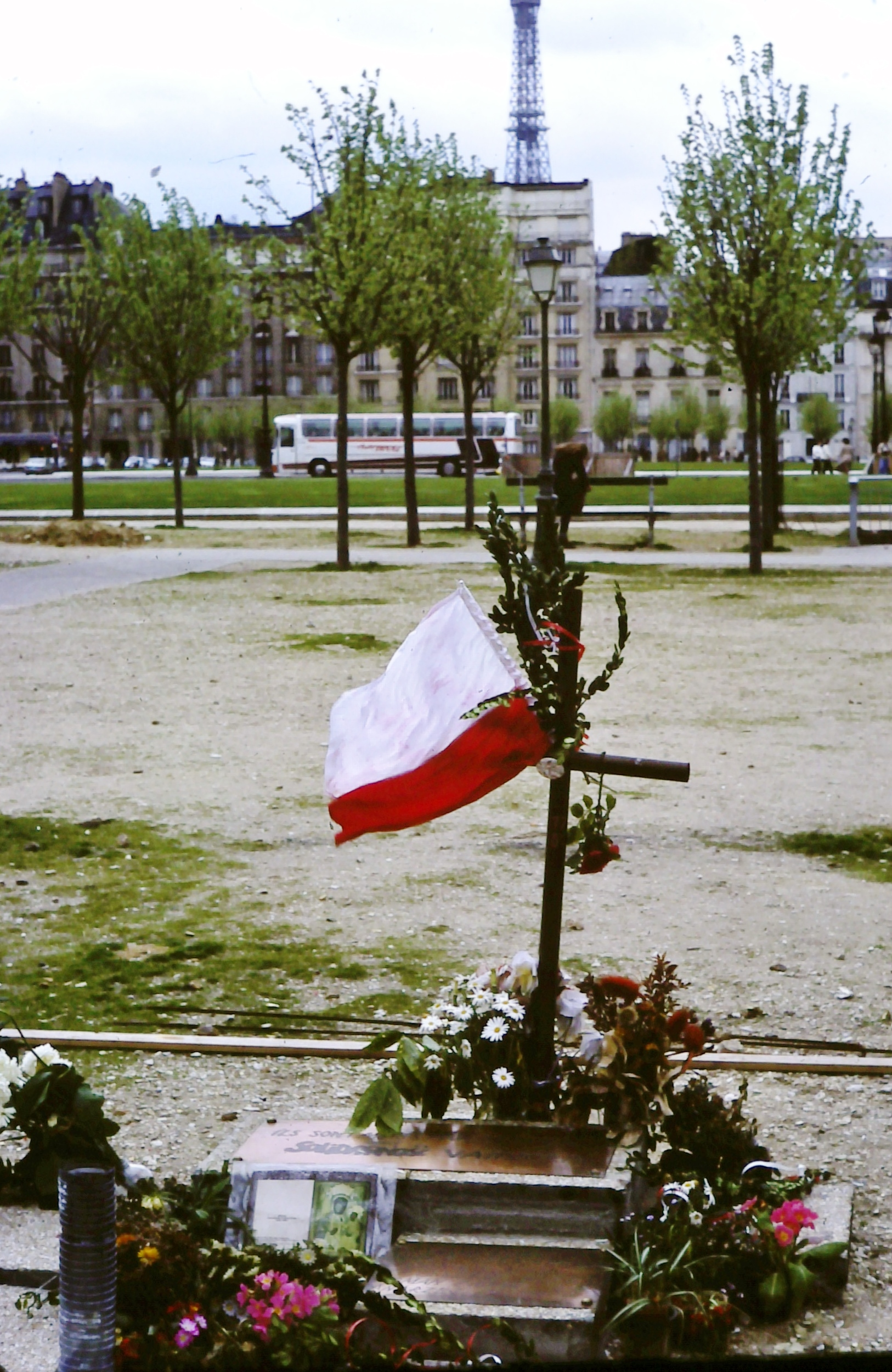
Memorial to the "martyrs" of Solidarity outside Les Invalides in Paris, Easter 1982

On December 13, 1981, Jaruzelski began a crack-down on Solidarity, declaring martial law and creating a Military Council of National Salvation (Wojskowa Rada Ocalenia Narodowego, or WRON). Solidarity's leaders, gathered at Gdańsk, were arrested and isolated in facilities guarded by the Security Service (Służba Bezpieczeństwa or SB), and some 5000 Solidarity supporters were arrested in the middle of the night. Censorship was expanded, and military forces appeared on the streets. A couple of hundred strikes and occupations occurred, chiefly at the largest plants and at several Silesian coal mines, but were broken by ZOMO paramilitary riot police. One of the largest demonstrations, on December 16, 1981, took place at the Wujek Coal Mine, where government forces opened fire on demonstrators, killing nine and seriously injuring twenty-two. The next day, during protests at Gdańsk, government forces again fired at demonstrators, killing one and injuring two. By December 28, 1981, strikes had ceased, and Solidarity appeared crippled. The last strike in the 1981 Poland, which ended on December 28, took place in the Piast Coal Mine in the Upper Silesian town of Bieruń. It was the longest underground strike in the history of Poland, lasting fourteen days. Some 2000 miners began it on December 14, going 650 meters underground. Out of the initial 2000, half remained until the last day. Starving, they gave up after military authorities promised they would not be prosecuted. On October 8, 1982, Solidarity was banned.

The range of support for the Solidarity was unique: no other movement in the world was supported by Ronald Reagan, George H. W. Bush, Mikhail Gorbachev, Santiago Carrillo, Enrico Berlinguer, Pope John Paul II, Elizabeth II, Margaret Thatcher, Tony Benn, Polish Legion of American Veterans, Polish government-in-exile, Communist Polish Defectors, East Bloc Defectors, peace campaigners, NATO Spokesmen, United Nations Spokesmen, Christians, Western Communists, Conservatives, Liberals and Socialists. The international community outside the Iron Curtain condemned Jaruzelski's actions and declared support for Solidarity; dedicated organizations were formed for that purpose (like Polish Solidarity Campaign in Great Britain). US President Ronald Reagan imposed economic sanctions on Poland, which eventually would force the Polish government into liberalizing its policies. Meanwhile, the CIA together with the Catholic Church and various Western trade unions such as the AFL–CIO provided funds, equipment and advice to the Solidarity underground. The political alliance of Reagan and the Pope would prove important to the future of Solidarity. The Polish public also supported what was left of Solidarity; a major medium for demonstrating support of Solidarity became masses held by priests such as Jerzy Popiełuszko.

Besides the Communist authorities, Solidarity was also opposed by some of the Polish (émigré) radical right, believing Solidarity or KOR to be disguised communist groups, dominated by Jewish Trotskyite Zionists.

In July 1983, martial law was formally lifted, though many heightened controls on civil liberties and political life, as well as food rationing, remained in place through the mid-to-late 1980s.

== Underground Solidarity (1982–1988) ==
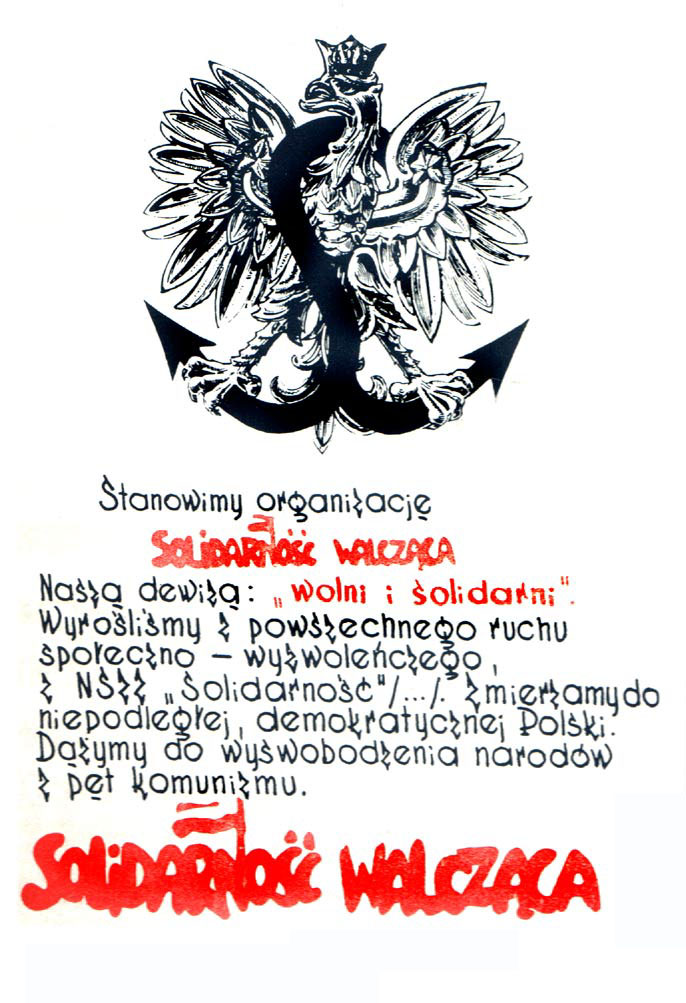
"Fighting Solidarity" poster, modeled after World War II "Kotwica" emblem

Almost immediately after the legal Solidarity leadership had been arrested, underground structures began to arise. On April 12, 1982, Radio Solidarity began broadcasting. On April 22, Zbigniew Bujak, Bogdan Lis, Władysław Frasyniuk and Władysław Hardek created an Interim Coordinating Commission (Tymczasowa Komisja Koordynacyjna) to serve as an underground leadership for Solidarity. On May 6 another underground Solidarity organization, an NSSZ "S" Regional Coordinating Commission (Regionalna Komisja Koordynacyjna NSZZ "S"), was created by Bogdan Borusewicz, Aleksander Hall, Stanisław Jarosz, Bogdan Lis and Marian Świtek. June 1982 saw the creation of a Fighting Solidarity (Solidarność Walcząca) organization.

Throughout the mid-1980s, Solidarity persevered as an exclusively underground organization. Its activists were dogged by the Security Service (SB), but managed to strike back: on May 1, 1982, a series of anti-government protests brought out thousands of participants—several dozen thousand in Kraków, Warsaw and Gdańsk. On May 3 more protests took place, during celebrations of the Constitution of May 3, 1791. On that day, Communist secret services killed four demonstrators – three in Warsaw and one in Wrocław. Another wave of demonstrations occurred on August 31, 1982, on the second anniversary of the Gdańsk Agreement (see August 31, 1982 demonstrations in Poland). Altogether, on that day six demonstrators were killed – three in Lubin, one in Kielce, one in Wrocław and one in Gdańsk. Another person was killed on the next day, during a demonstration in Częstochowa. Further strikes occurred at Gdańsk and Nowa Huta between October 11 and 13. In Nowa Huta, a 20-year-old student Bogdan Wlosik was shot by a secret service officer.

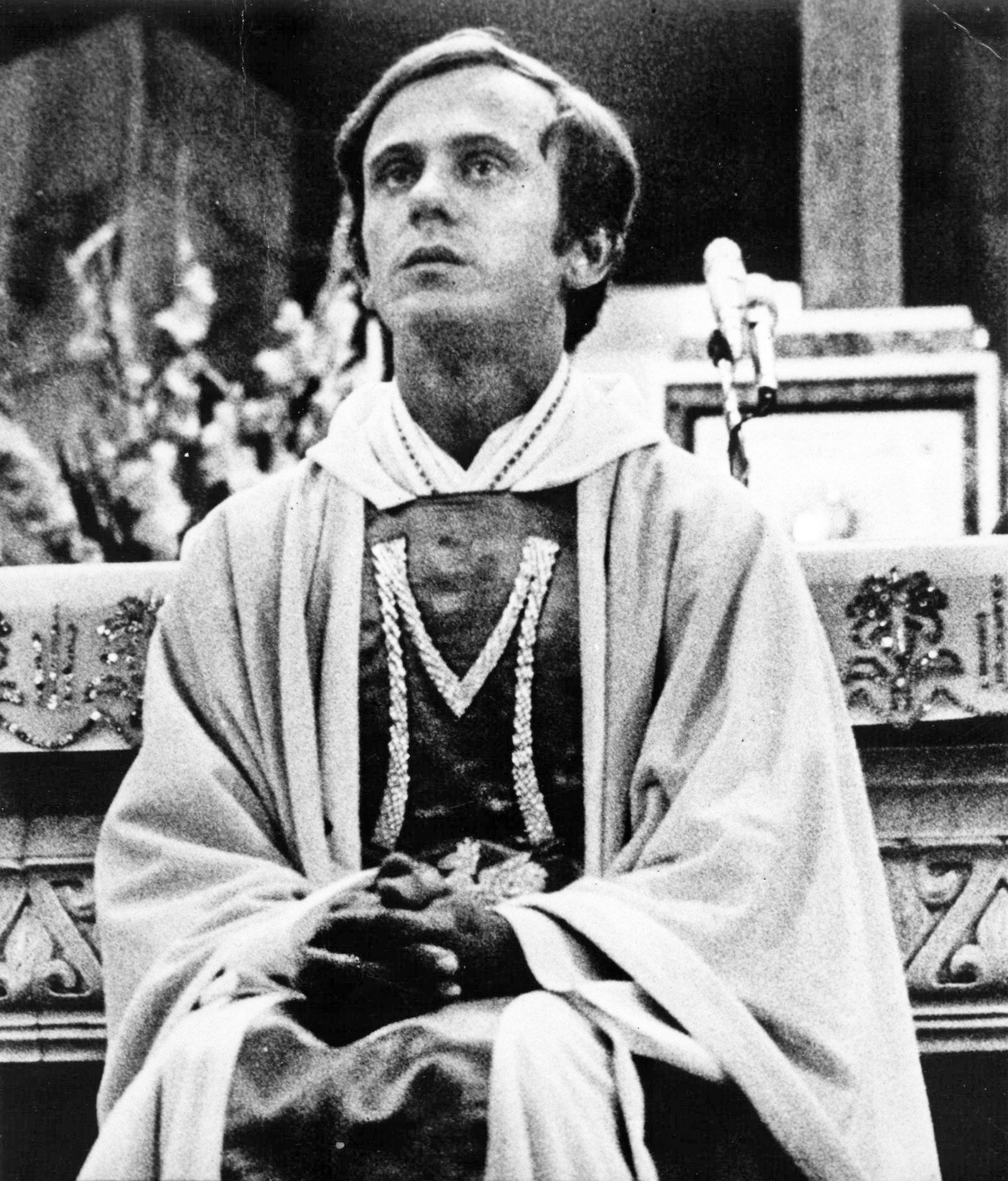
A wave of protests was sparked by the 1984 murder of Warsaw priest Jerzy Popiełuszko.

On November 14, 1982, Wałęsa was released. However, on December 9 the SB carried out a large anti-Solidarity operation, brutally beating and arresting over 10,000 activists. On December 27 Solidarity's assets were transferred by the authorities to a pro-government trade union, the All-Poland Alliance of Trade Unions (Ogólnopolskie Porozumienie Związków Zawodowych, or OPZZ). Yet Solidarity was far from broken: by early 1983 the underground had over 70,000 members, whose activities included publishing over 500 underground newspapers. In the first half of 1983 street protests were frequent; on May 1, two persons were killed in Kraków and one in Wrocław. Two days later, two additional demonstrators were killed in Warsaw.

On July 22, 1983, martial law was lifted, and amnesty was granted to many imprisoned Solidarity members, who were released. On October 5, Wałęsa was awarded the Nobel Peace Prize. The Polish government, however, refused to issue him a passport to travel to Oslo; Wałęsa's prize was accepted on his behalf by his wife. It later transpired that the SB had prepared bogus documents, accusing Wałęsa of immoral and illegal activities that had been given to the Nobel committee in an attempt to derail his nomination.

On October 19, 1984 a popular pro-Solidarity priest, Jerzy Popiełuszko was killed. As the facts emerged, thousands of people declared their solidarity with the deceased priest by attending his funeral, held on November 3, 1984. The government attempted to smooth over the situation by releasing thousands of political prisoners; a year later, however, there followed a new wave of arrests. Frasyniuk, Lis and Adam Michnik, members of the "S" underground, were brutally beaten and arrested on February 13, 1985, starved, tortured, interrogated, placed on trial, and sentenced to several years' imprisonment for committing several acts of terror against the Polish state and its people.

== Second Solidarity (1988–1989) ==
On March 11, 1985, power in the Soviet Union was assumed by Mikhail Gorbachev. The worsening economic situation in the entire Eastern Bloc, including the Soviet Union, together with other factors, forced Gorbachev to carry out a number of reforms, not only in the field of economics (uskoreniye) but in the political and social realms (glasnost and perestroika). Gorbachev's policies soon caused a corresponding shift in the policies of Soviet satellites, including the People's Republic of Poland.

On September 11, 1986, 225 Polish political prisoners were released—the last of those connected with Solidarity, arrested during the previous years. Following amnesty on September 30, Wałęsa created the first public, legal Solidarity entity since the declaration of martial law—the Temporary Council of NSZZ Solidarity (Polish: Tymczasowa Rada NSZZ Solidarność)—with Bogdan Borusewicz, Zbigniew Bujak, Władysław Frasyniuk, Tadeusz Janusz Jedynak, Bogdan Lis, Janusz Pałubicki and Józef Pinior. Soon afterwards, the new Council was – exceptionally – admitted to both the International Confederation of Free Trade Unions and the World Confederation of Labour. Many local Solidarity chapters now broke their cover throughout Poland, and on October 25, 1987, the National Executive Committee of NSZZ Solidarity (Polish: Krajowa Komisja Wykonawcza NSZZ Solidarność) was created. Nonetheless, Solidarity members and activists continued to be persecuted and discriminated, if less so than during the early 1980s. In the late 1980s, a rift between Wałęsa's faction and a more radical Fighting Solidarity grew as the former wanted to negotiate with the government, while the latter planned for an anti-Communist revolution.

By 1988, Poland's economy was in worse condition than it had been eight years earlier. International sanctions, combined with the government's unwillingness to introduce reforms, intensified the old problems. Inefficient government-run planned-economy enterprises wasted labor and resources, producing substandard goods for which there was little demand. Polish exports were low, both because of the sanctions and because the goods were as unattractive abroad as they were at home. Foreign debt and inflation mounted. There were no funds to modernize factories, and the promised "market socialism" materialized as a shortage economy characterized by long queues and empty shelves. Reforms introduced by Jaruzelski and Mieczysław Rakowski came too little and too late, especially as changes in the Soviet Union had bolstered the public's expectation that change must come, and the Soviets ceased their efforts to prop up Poland's failing regime.

In February 1988, the government hiked food prices by 40%. On April 21, a new wave of strikes hit the country. On May 2, workers at the Gdańsk Shipyard went on strike. That strike was broken by the government between May 5 and 10, but only temporarily: on August 15, a new strike took place at the "July Manifesto" mine in Jastrzębie-Zdrój. By August 20 the strike had spread to many other mines, and on August 22 the Gdańsk Shipyard joined the strike. Poland's Communist government then decided to negotiate.

"High Noon, June 4, 1989", Solidarity Citizens' Committee election poster by Tomasz Sarnecki

On August 26, Czesław Kiszczak, the Minister of Internal Affairs, declared on television that the government was willing to negotiate, and five days later he met with Wałęsa. The strikes ended the following day, and on November 30, during a televised debate between Wałęsa and Alfred Miodowicz (leader of the pro-government trade union, the All-Poland Alliance of Trade Unions, or OPZZ), Wałęsa scored a public-relations victory.

On December 18, a hundred-member Citizens' Committee (Polish: Komitet Obywatelski) was formed within Solidarity. It comprised several sections, each responsible for presenting a specific aspect of opposition demands to the government. Wałęsa and the majority of Solidarity leaders supported negotiation, while a minority wanted an anti-Communist revolution. Under Wałęsa's leadership, Solidarity decided to pursue a peaceful solution, and the pro-violence faction never attained any substantial power, nor did it take any action.

On January 27, 1989, in a meeting between Wałęsa and Kiszczak, a list was drawn up of members of the main negotiating teams. The conference that began on February 6 would be known as the Polish Round Table Talks. The 56 participants included 20 from "S", 6 from OPZZ, 14 from the PZPR, 14 "independent authorities", and two priests. The Polish Round Table Talks took place in Warsaw from February 6 to April 4, 1989. The Communists, led by General Jaruzelski, hoped to co-opt prominent opposition leaders into the ruling group without making major changes in the structure of political power. Solidarity, while hopeful, did not anticipate major changes. In fact, the talks would radically alter the shape of the Polish government and society.

On April 17, 1989, Solidarity was legalized, and its membership soon reached 1.5 million. The Solidarity Citizens' Committee (Komitet Obywatelski "Solidarność") was given permission to field candidates in the upcoming elections. Election law allowed Solidarity to put forward candidates for only 35% of the seats in the Sejm, but there were no restrictions in regard to Senat candidates. Agitation and propaganda continued legally up to election day. Despite its shortage of resources, Solidarity managed to carry on an electoral campaign. On May 8, the first issue of a new pro-Solidarity newspaper, Gazeta Wyborcza (The Election Gazette), was published. Posters of Wałęsa supporting various candidates, appeared throughout the country.

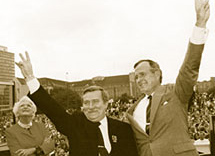
Solidarity Chairman Wałęsa (center) with US President George H. W. Bush (right) and Barbara Bush (left) in Warsaw, July 1989

Pre-election public-opinion polls had promised victory to the Communists. Thus the total defeat of the PZPR and its satellite parties came as a surprise to all involved: after the first round of elections, it became evident that Solidarity had fared extremely well, capturing 160 of 161 contested Sejm seats, and 92 of 100 Senate seats. After the second round, it had won virtually every seat—all 161 in the Sejm, and 99 in the Senate.

These elections, in which anti-Communist candidates won a striking victory, inaugurated a series of peaceful anti-Communist revolutions in Central and Eastern Europe that eventually culminated in the Fall of Communism.

The new Contract Sejm, named for the agreement that had been reached by the Communist party and the Solidarity movement during the Polish Round Table Talks, would be dominated by Solidarity. As agreed beforehand, Wojciech Jaruzelski was elected president; however, the Communist candidate for Prime Minister, Czesław Kiszczak, who replaced Mieczysław Rakowski, failed to gain enough support to form a government.

On June 23, a Solidarity Citizens' Parliamentary Club (Polish: Obywatelski Klub Parliamentarny Solidarność) was formed, led by Bronisław Geremek. It formed a coalition with two ex-satellite parties of the PZPR — United People's Party and Democratic Party — which had now chosen to "rebel" against the PZPR, which found itself in the minority. On August 24, the Sejm elected Tadeusz Mazowiecki, a Solidarity representative, to be Prime Minister of Poland. Not only was he the first non-Communist Polish Prime Minister since 1945, he became the first non-Communist prime minister in Eastern Europe for nearly 40 years. In his speech he talked about the "thick line" (Polish: Gruba kreska) which would separate his government from the Communist past. By the end of August 1989, a Solidarity-led coalition government had been formed.

== Party and trade union (1989–2020) ==
The fall of the Communist regime marked a new chapter in the history of Poland and in the history of Solidarity. Having defeated the Communist government, Solidarity found itself in a role it was much less prepared for — that of a political party — and soon began to lose popularity. Conflicts among Solidarity factions intensified. Wałęsa was elected Solidarity chairman, but support for him could be seen to be crumbling. One of his main opponents, Władysław Frasyniuk, withdrew from elections altogether. In September 1990, Wałęsa declared that Gazeta Wyborcza had no right to use the Solidarity logo. Later that month, Wałęsa announced his intent to run for president of Poland. In December 1990, he was elected president. He resigned his Solidarity post and became the first president of Poland ever to be elected by popular vote.

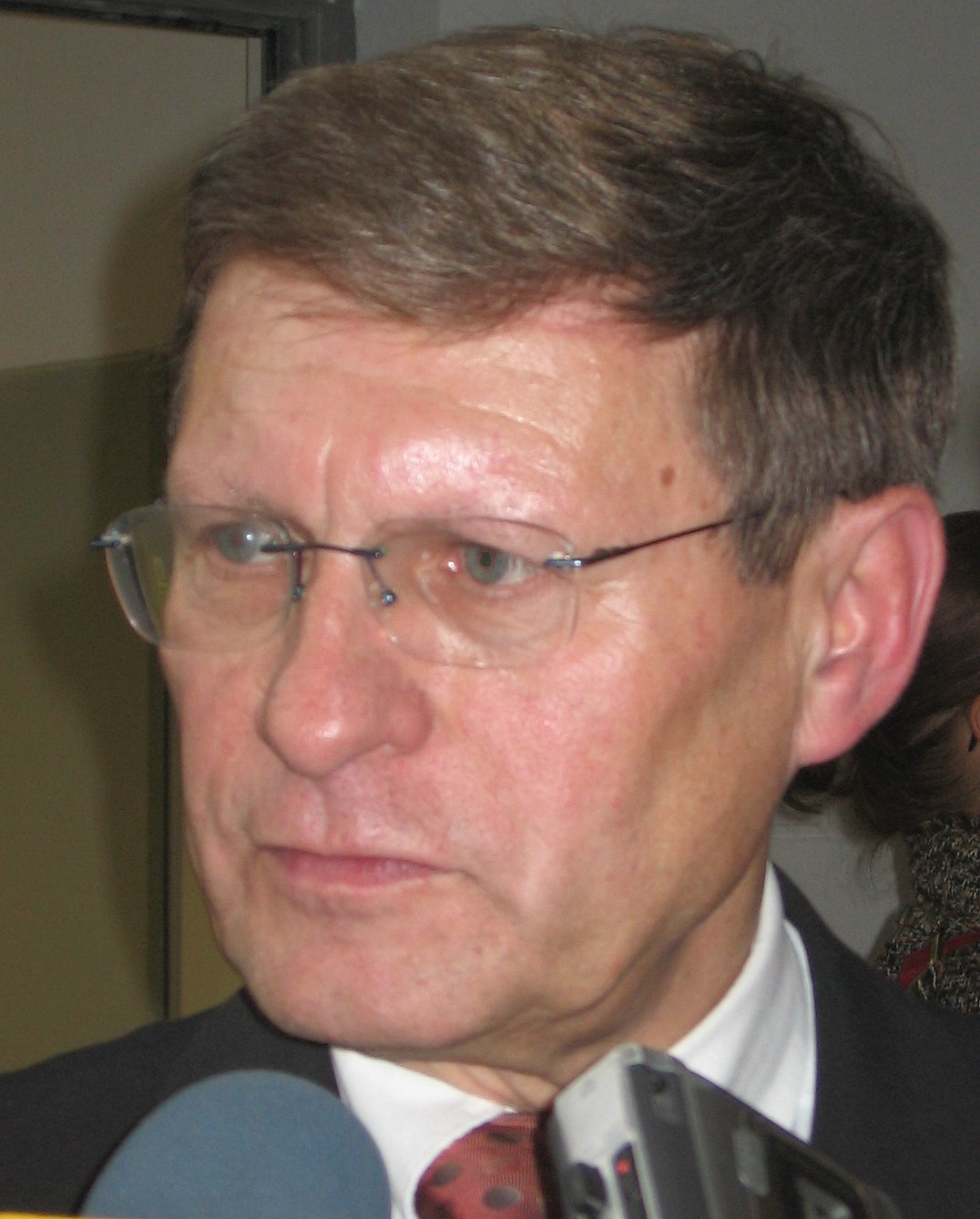
Solidarity economist Leszek Balcerowicz, framer of the Balcerowicz Plan

In February 1991, Marian Krzaklewski was elected the leader of Solidarity. President Wałęsa's vision and that of the new Solidarity leadership were diverging. Far from supporting Wałęsa, Solidarity was becoming increasingly critical of the government, and decided to create its own political party for action in the upcoming 1991 parliamentary elections.

The 1991 elections were characterized by a large number of competing parties, many claiming the legacy of anti-Communism, and the Solidarity party garnered only 5% of the votes. On January 13, 1992, Solidarity declared its first strike against the democratically elected government: a one-hour strike against a proposal to raise energy prices. Another, two-hour strike took place on December 14. On May 19, 1993, Solidarity deputies proposed a no-confidence motion—which passed—against the government of Prime Minister Hanna Suchocka. President Wałęsa declined to accept the prime minister's resignation, and dismissed the parliament. It was in the ensuing 1993 parliamentary elections that it became evident how much Solidarity's support had eroded in the previous three years. Even though some Solidarity deputies sought to assume a more left-wing stance and to distance themselves from the right-wing government, Solidarity remained identified in the public mind with that government. Hence it suffered from the growing disillusionment of the populace, as the transition from a Communist to a capitalist system failed to generate instant wealth and raise Poland's living standards to those in the West, and the government's financial "shock therapy" (the Balcerowicz Plan) generated much opposition.

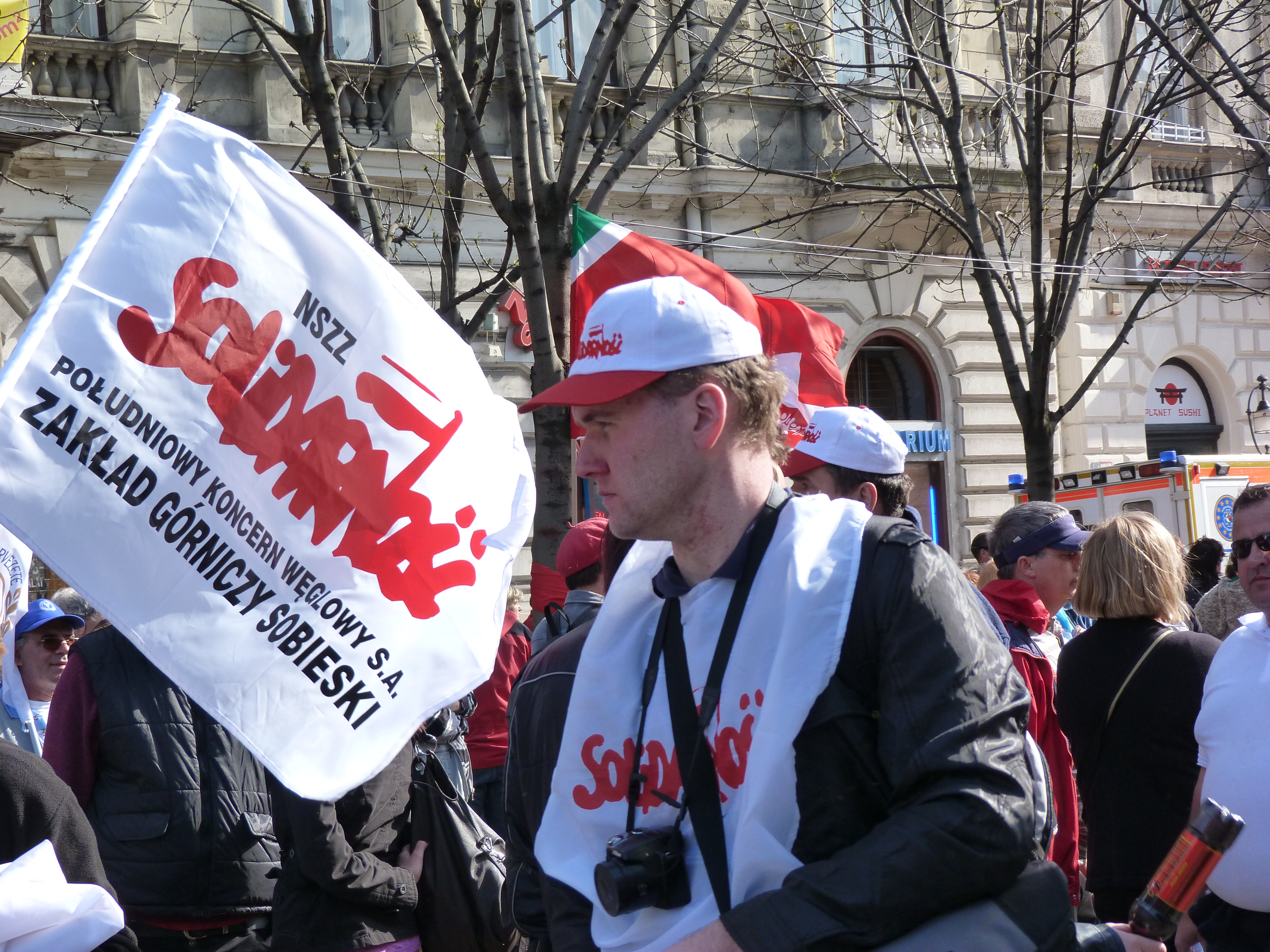
Solidarity, ETUC Demonstration, Budapest, 2011

In the elections, Solidarity received only 4.9% of the votes, 0.1% less than the 5% required in order to enter parliament (Solidarity still had nine senators, two fewer than in the previous Senate). The victorious party was the Democratic Left Alliance (Polish: Sojusz Lewicy Demokratycznej or SLD), a post-Communist left-wing party.

Solidarity now joined forces with its erstwhile enemy, the All-Poland Alliance of Trade Unions (OPZZ), and some protests were organized by both trade unions. The following year, Solidarity organized many strikes over the state of the Polish mining industry. In 1995, a demonstration before the Polish parliament was broken up by the police (now again known as policja) using batons and water cannons. Nonetheless, Solidarity decided to support Wałęsa in the 1995 Polish presidential election. In a second major defeat for the Polish right wing, the elections were won by an SLD candidate, Aleksander Kwaśniewski, who received 51.72% of votes. A Solidarity call for new elections went unheeded, but the Sejm still managed to pass a resolution condemning the 1981 martial law (despite the SLD voting against). Meanwhile, the left-wing OPZZ trade union had acquired 2.5 million members, twice as many as the contemporary Solidarity (with 1.3 million).

In June 1996, Solidarity Electoral Action (Polish: Akcja Wyborcza Solidarność) was founded as a coalition of over 30 parties, uniting liberal, conservative and Christian-democratic forces. As the public became disillusioned with the SLD and its allies, AWS was victorious in the 1997 parliamentary elections. Jerzy Buzek became the new prime minister; however, controversies over domestic reforms, Poland's 1999 entry into NATO, and the accession process to the European Union, combined with disagreements between AWS and its political allies (the Freedom Union—Polish: Unia Wolności) and infighting within AWS itself, as well as corruption, eventually resulted in the loss of much public support. AWS leader Marian Krzaklewski lost the 2000 presidential election, and in the 2001 parliamentary elections AWS failed to elect a single deputy to the parliament. After this debacle, Krzaklewski was replaced by Janusz Śniadek (in 2002) but the union decided to distance itself from politics.

In 2006, Solidarity had some 1.5 million members making it the largest trade union in Poland. Its mission statement declares that Solidarity, "basing its activities on Christian ethics and Catholic social teachings, works to protect workers' interests and to fulfill their material, social and cultural aspirations."

The European Solidarity Centre, a museum and library devoted to the history of Solidarity and other opposition movements of the Eastern Bloc, opened in Gdańsk on August 31, 2014. In 2020, to commemorate the 40th anniversary of the creation of the Solidarity movement many important landmarks around the world were lit up in white and red colours including the Niagara Falls, Christ the Redeemer Statue, Széchenyi Chain Bridge in Budapest, Wrigley Building in Chicago, Qutb Minar in New Delhi with posters and Solidarity logos being displayed in cities such as Berlin, Dublin, NATO headquarters in Brussels, Belgrade and Santa Monica in California.

Solidarity endorsed Andrzej Duda, the Law and Justice (PiS) candidate in the 2020 Polish presidential election. Solidarity also endorsed Karol Nawrocki, the Law and Justice (PiS) candidate in the 2025 Polish presidential election.
