= Solidarity Memorial =

Memorial in Warsaw, Poland

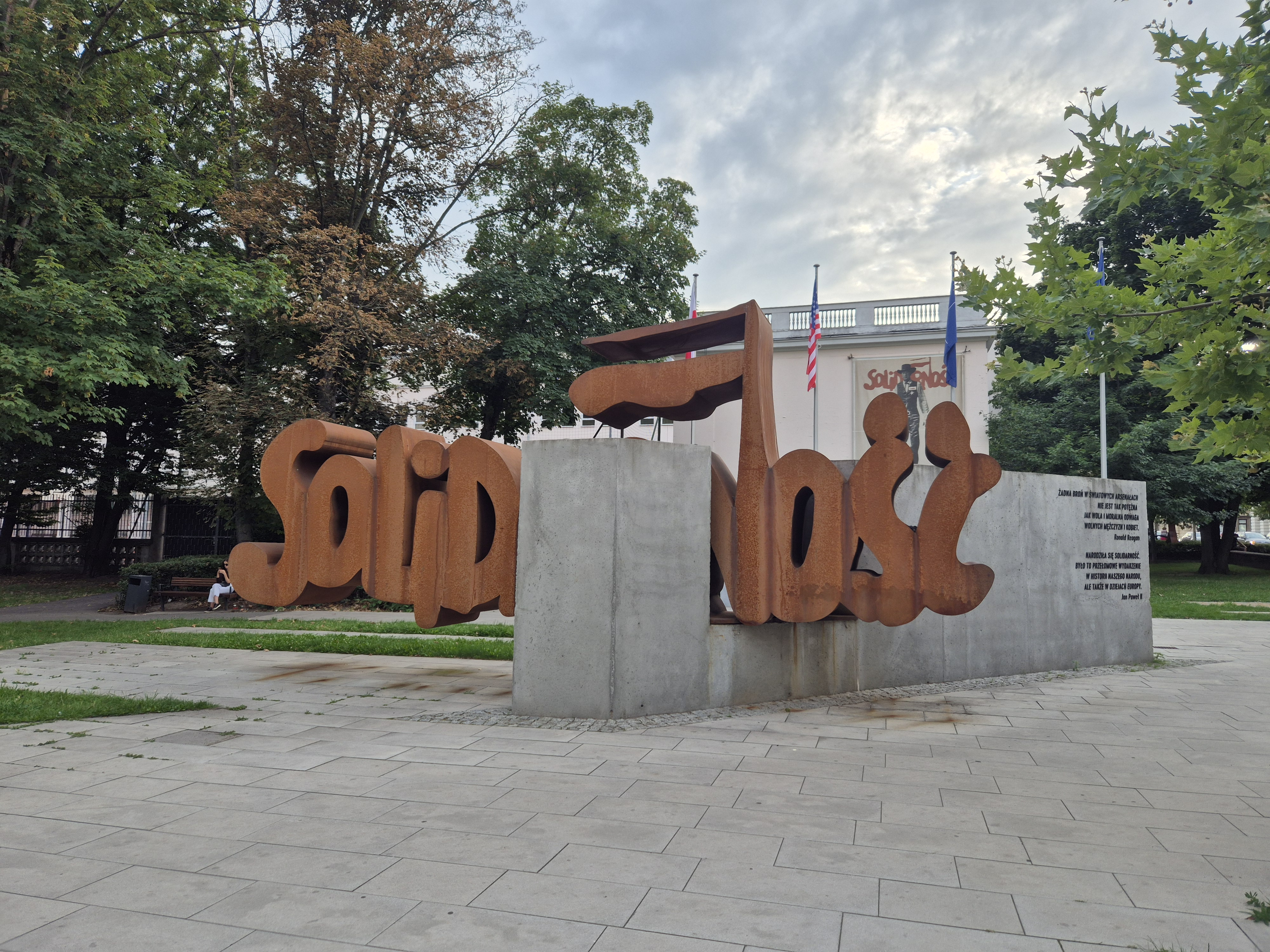
- The monument in 2025.
- Interactive map of Solidarity Memorial
- Location: Corner of Świętokrzyska Street and Kopernika Street, Downtown, Warsaw, Poland
- Coordinates: 52.237046°N 21.019996°E
- Type: Sculpture
- Material: Concrete, metal
- Opening date: 4 June 2021
- Dedicated to: Solidarity

The Solidarity Memorial (Polish: Pomnik „Solidarności”) is a monument in Warsaw, Poland, placed at the intersection of Świętokrzyska and Kopernika Streets, within the North Downtown neighbourhood. It is dedicated to the Solidarity trade union, which throughout the 1980s was a broad anti-authoritarian social movement, using methods of civil resistance to advance the causes of workers' rights and social change, which eventually led to the agreement with the government for the 1989 parliamentary election, the country's first pluralistic election since 1947. The sculpture consists of its large metal logo, cutting through a long concrete block, which incorporates into its structure the fragments of the Berlin Wall. The monument was unveiled on 4 June 2021, on the 32nd anniversary of the 1989 election.

== History ==
The monument was financed by the Ronald Reagan Foundation, and proposed and co-designed by its chairperson, Janusz Dorosiewicz, together with Jerzy Janiszewski, author of the Solidarity logo. It was unveiled on 4 June 2021, on the 32nd anniversary of the 1989 parliamentary election, the country's first pluralistic election since 1947. The monument was originally proposed in 2014, with date of its unveiling postponed several times.

The ceremony was attended by mayor of Warsaw Rafał Trzaskowski and Sviatlana Tsikhanouskaya, a candidate in the 2020 Belarusian presidential election and leader of the anti-authoritarian opposition in the country.

The Solidarity trade union was against the construction of the logo, accusing its author of illegally using its logo without their permission, and demanded its removal. It stated that having bought the right to the logo from its author, Jerzy Janiszewski, the organization has exclusive rights to its distribution. Solidarity also has filed a notion to the Warsaw public prosecutor's office, which approved it, initiating proceedings, and elevating it to the regional office. The Ronald Reagan Foundation stated that it received permission for its usage from Janiszewski, who himself stated that while he signed agreement with Solidarity giving it right to use of the logo, he did not sign off the full ownership of it. Furthermore, he claimed that it became a historic symbol and heritage good of all Polish people, and as such, giving the population the right to its non-commercial usage. The Warsaw City Hall has later reaffirmed and sided with Janiszewski's statements.

== Design ==
The monument consists of a concrete wall, cut through on one of its ends by a large orange metal sculpture of the logo of the Solidarity trade union. The design incorporates authentic fragments of the Berlin Wall, with graffiti on them, into the construction. It also features quotes by President of the United States Ronald Reagan and Pope John Paul II. It reads:

Polish inscription

Żadna broń w światowych arsenałach
nie jest tak potężna
jak wola i moralna odwaga
wolnych mężczyzn i kobiet.
Ronald Reagan

Narodziła się Solidarność.
Było to przełomowe wydarzenie
w historii naszego narodu,
ale także w dziejach Europy.
Jan Paweł II

Translation:
English translation

No weapon in the arsenals of the world
is so formidable
as the will and moral courage of
free men and women.
Ronald Reagan

The Solidarity was born.
It was a landmark event
in the history of our nation,
but also in the history of Europe.
John Paul II

== Gallery ==
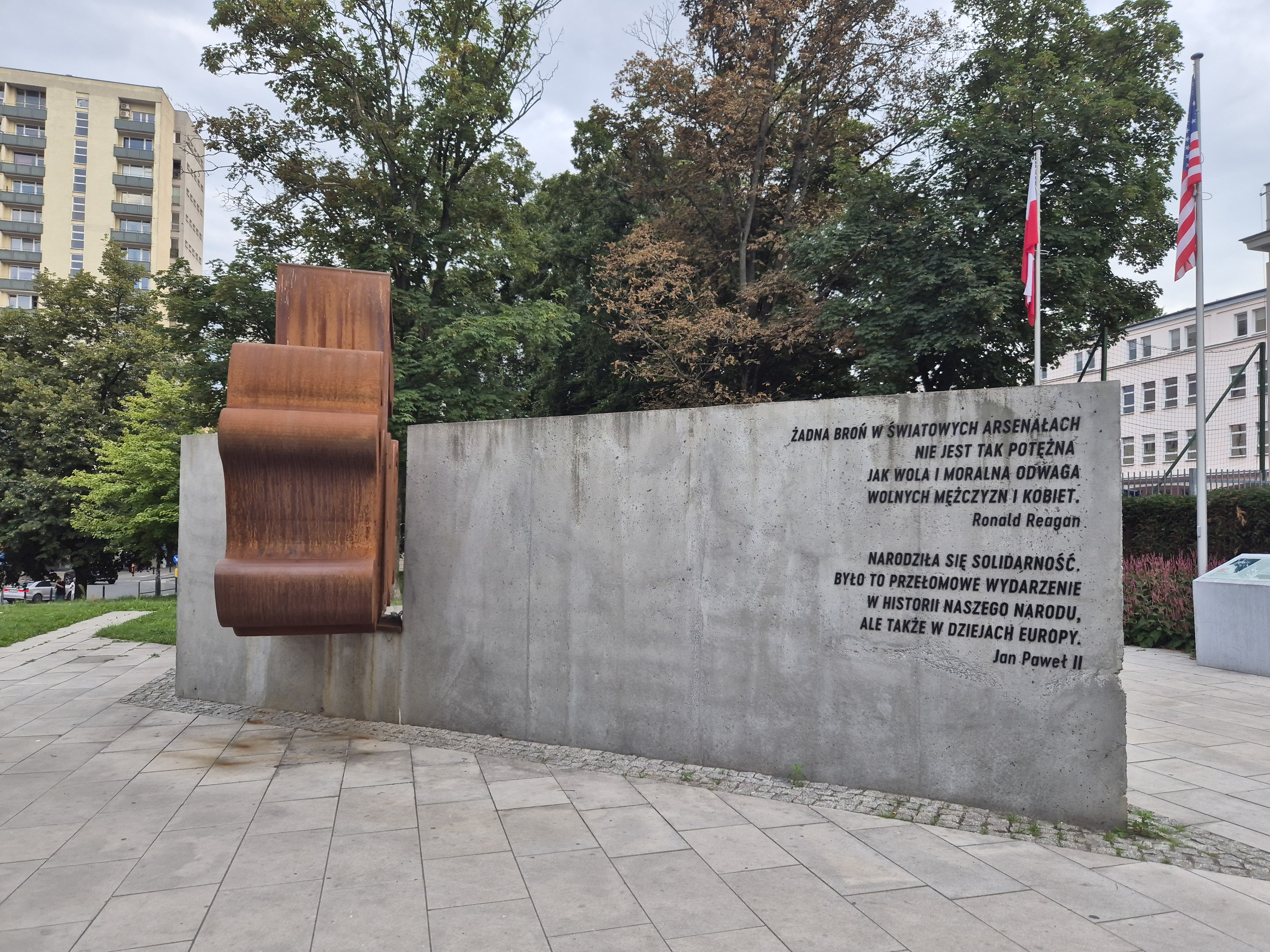
The right side of the monument, featuring the inscriptions.

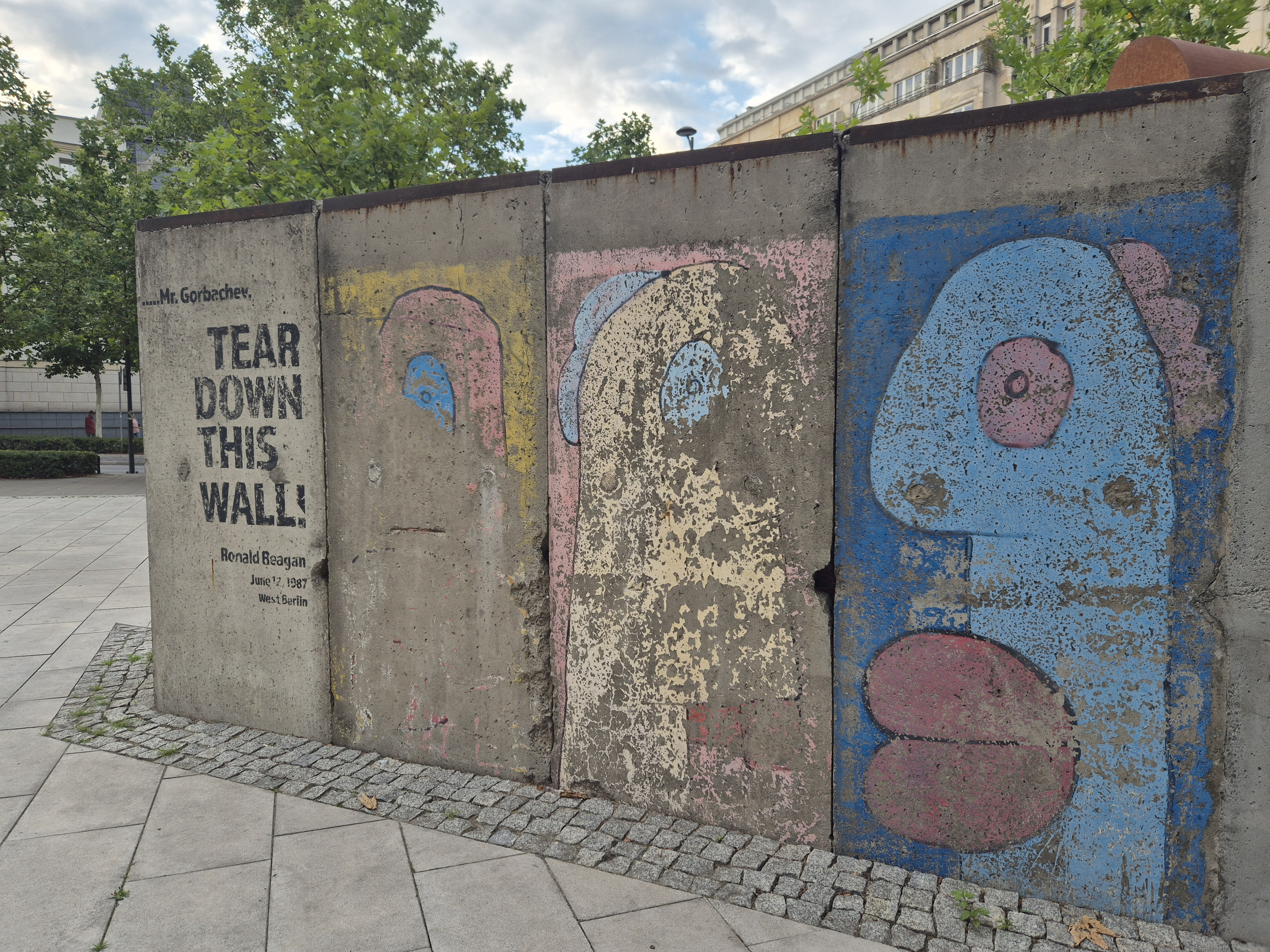
The back of the monument, featuring the fragments of the Berlin Wall.
