= OTA =

OTA or ota may stand for:

== Art, entertainment, and media ==
- Off the Air, an Adult Swim television series
- Otakon, an annual anime convention in Baltimore, Maryland

== Electronics, science, and technology ==
- Ochratoxin A (also termed OTA), a mycotoxin
- Operational transconductance amplifier, a kind of operational amplifier
- Optical tube assembly, the tubular optical train of a telescope as referred by astronomers
- Over-the-air, another word for wireless communication
  - Over-the-air programming, a method of reprogramming smart phones and other mobile devices
  - OTA bitmap, a data format developed by Nokia for sending images via SMS
  - Over-the-air television (or terrestrial television), the traditional method of television broadcast signal delivery
  - Over-the-air performance testing, evaluation of the performance of a radio including the impact of its radiation pattern and its interaction with device circuitry.

== Law and government ==
- Ontario Temperance Act, 1916 Canadian law prohibiting the manufacture, transportation and sale of alcohol and alcoholic beverages

== Language ==
- 'ota', the ISO 639 code for the Ottoman Turkish language

== Organizations ==
- Officers Training Academy, an Indian military academy in Chennai
- Office of Technology Assessment, a United States Congress agency that operated from 1972 to 1995
- Oklahoma Turnpike Authority, organization that operates turnpikes within the state of Oklahoma
- OpenTravel Alliance and the OpenTravel XML data format for the travel industry
- Orascom Telecom Algeria, another name for Djezzy GSM (a branch of Orascom group)
- Organic Trade Association, a North American association that focuses on the organic business community
- Orthodontic Technicians Association, the professional body that represents orthodontic technicians based in the United Kingdom.
- Oxford Text Archive, an archive of electronic texts and other literary and language resources at the University of Oxford
- OTA Broadcasting LLC, unit of Michael Dell's investment company MSD Capital purchasing small television stations potentially for resale of licenses via FCC auction.
- Online travel agency, a travel website that specializes in offering online planning sources and booking capabilities

== Professions ==
- Occupational therapy assistant

== Sports ==
- Organized Team Activities, used to describe preseason training sessions during National Football League training camp

== See also ==
- Ohta (disambiguation)
- Ota (disambiguation)
- Over-the-air (disambiguation)
