= Over-the-air =

Over-the-air or Over the Air may refer to:

== Technology ==
- Over-the-air update, an update to an embedded system that is delivered through a wireless network
- Terrestrial television or Digital terrestrial television, broadcast of television using radio waves from an earth-based transmitter
- Radio broadcasting, transmission of audio by radio waves intended to reach a wide audience

== Other uses ==
- Over the Air, a mobile-focused hack day and developer conference series in London

== See also ==
- OTA Bitmap (Over The Air Bitmap), a black and white image format for mobile phones
- Ota (disambiguation)
