= Nokia 1202 =

Mobile phone model

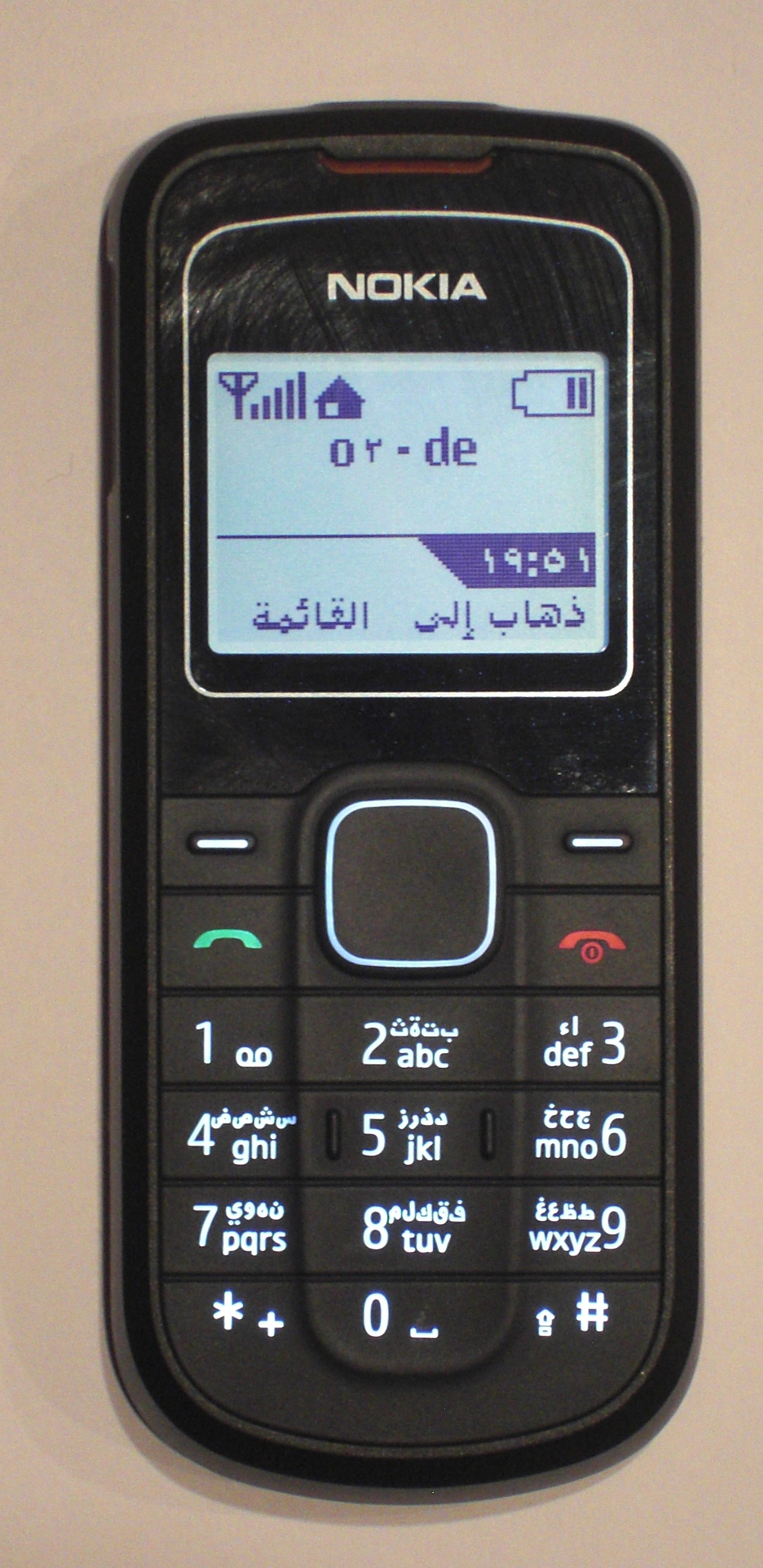
- Nokia 1202 with the Arabic UI and keypad, active on the German O2 carrier.
- Manufacturer: Nokia
- First released: November 2008
- Discontinued: Yes
- Predecessor: Nokia 1112; Nokia 1200; Nokia 1201
- Successor: Nokia 1280
- Related: Nokia 1203
- Compatible networks: 2G: GSM 900/1800; U.S. version: GSM 850/1900
- Form factor: Monoblock
- Dimensions: 105.3×45×13.1 mm (4.15×1.77×0.52 in)
- Weight: 78 g (3 oz)
- Operating system: S30 Software
- Storage: 4 MB
- Battery: Nokia BL-4C Li-Ion 720 mAh: Talk time: 9 hours; Standby: 696 hours (29 days)
- Display: 1.3", 96×68 pixels
- Connectivity: Picture message support via Smart Messaging
- Data inputs: alphanumeric keypad

Nokia 1202 is a low-end GSM mobile phone made by Nokia under their Ultrabasic series, being aimed at first-time mobile phone users. It was announced in November 2008, and was released in April 2009. The phone was manufactured in Romania, India and China.

== Hardware ==
Nokia 1202 has a 1.3-inch (33 mm) monochrome LCD with a 96×68 pixel resolution, and an alphanumeric keypad with a dust-resistant keymat. The battery lasts for up to nine hours of talk time, and 636 hours (29 days) of standby.

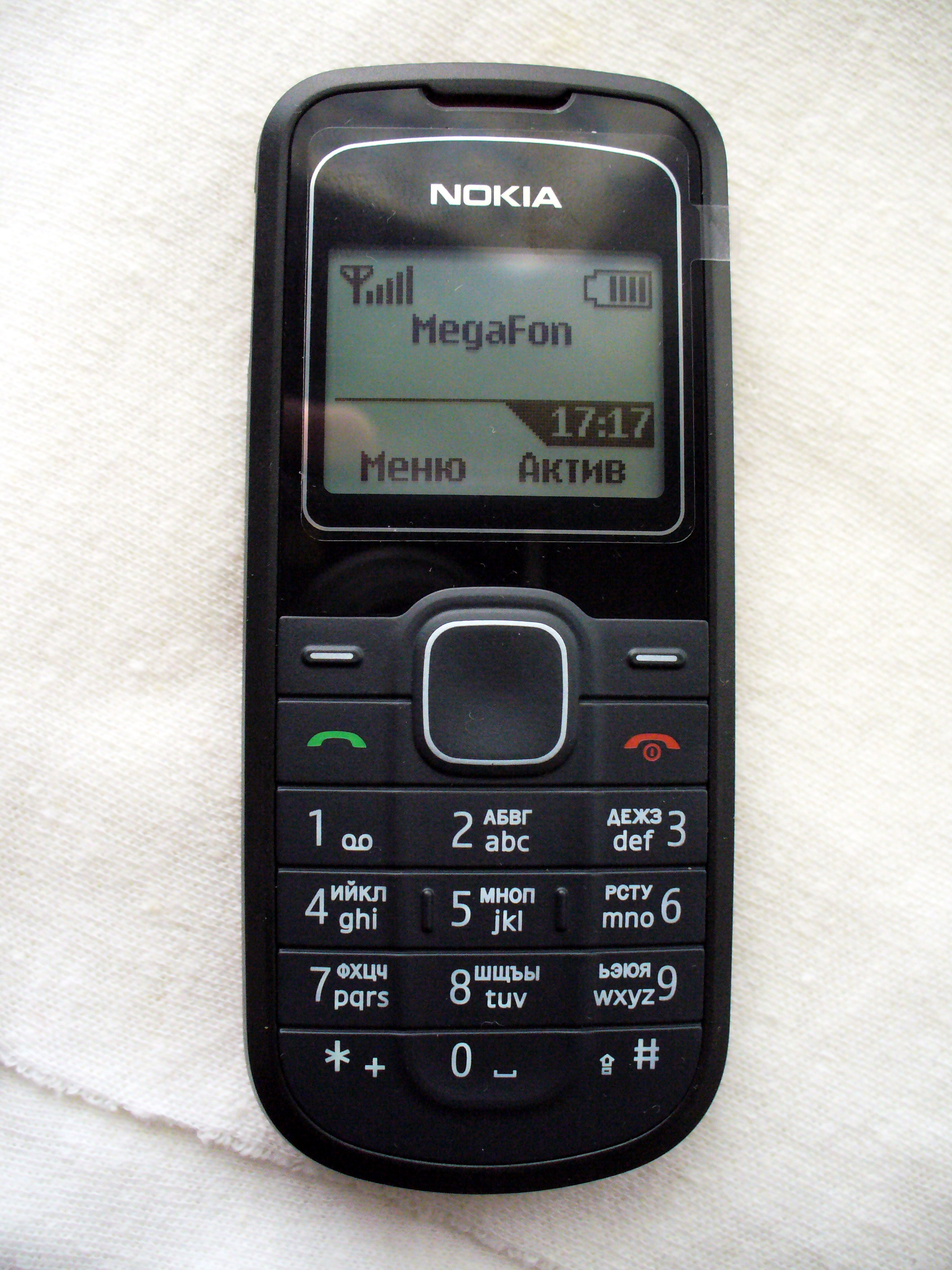
Nokia 1202-2 RH-112 with Russian-language UI and Cyrillic button labels

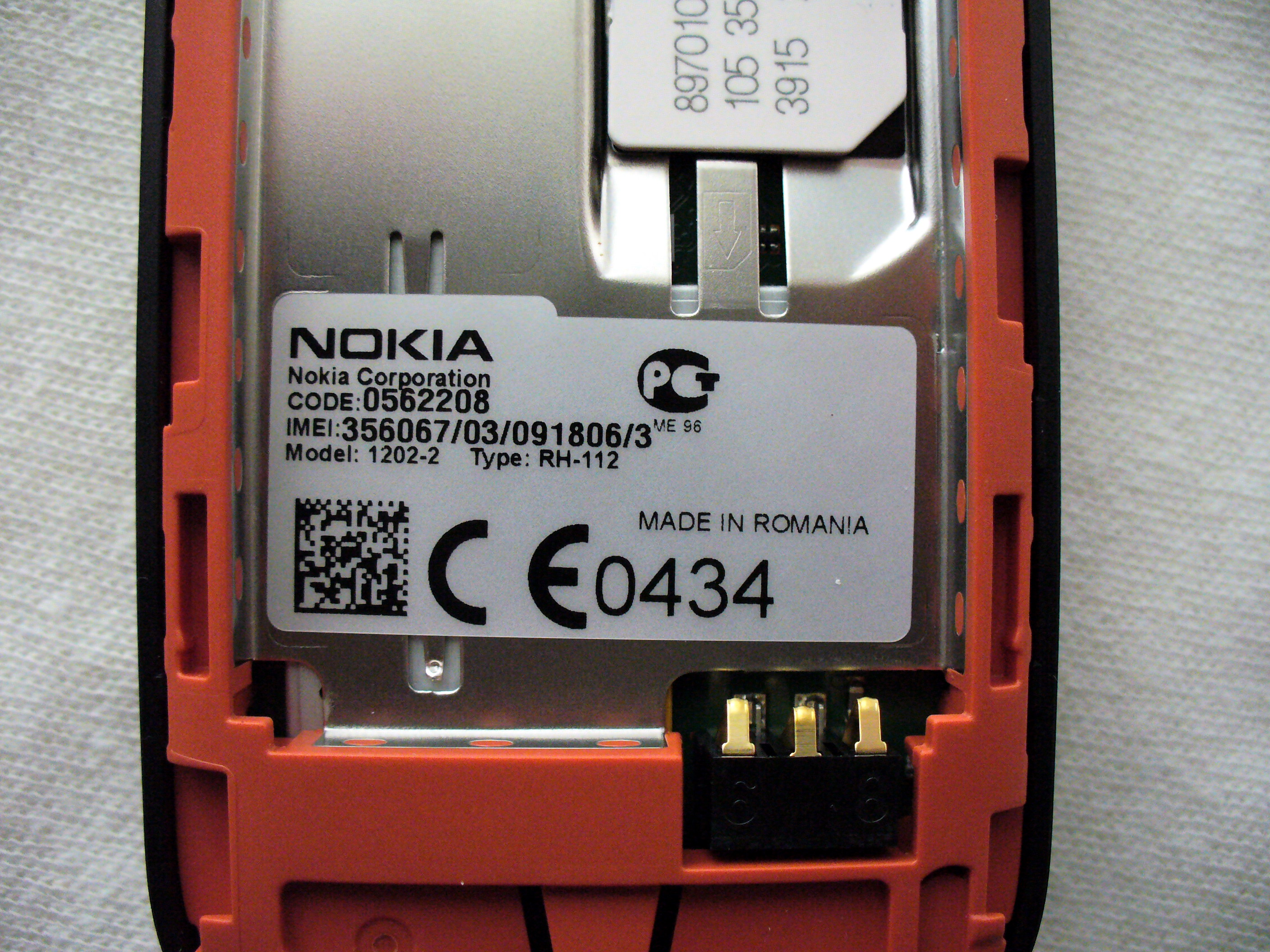
Nokia 1202-2 RH-112 IMEI label

== Software ==
The phone's system is equipped with call management timers and counters, device security (PIN code), predictive text input, a clock, analog clock display, a speaking alarm, picture messaging, and with several built-in games.
