= Solidaryca =

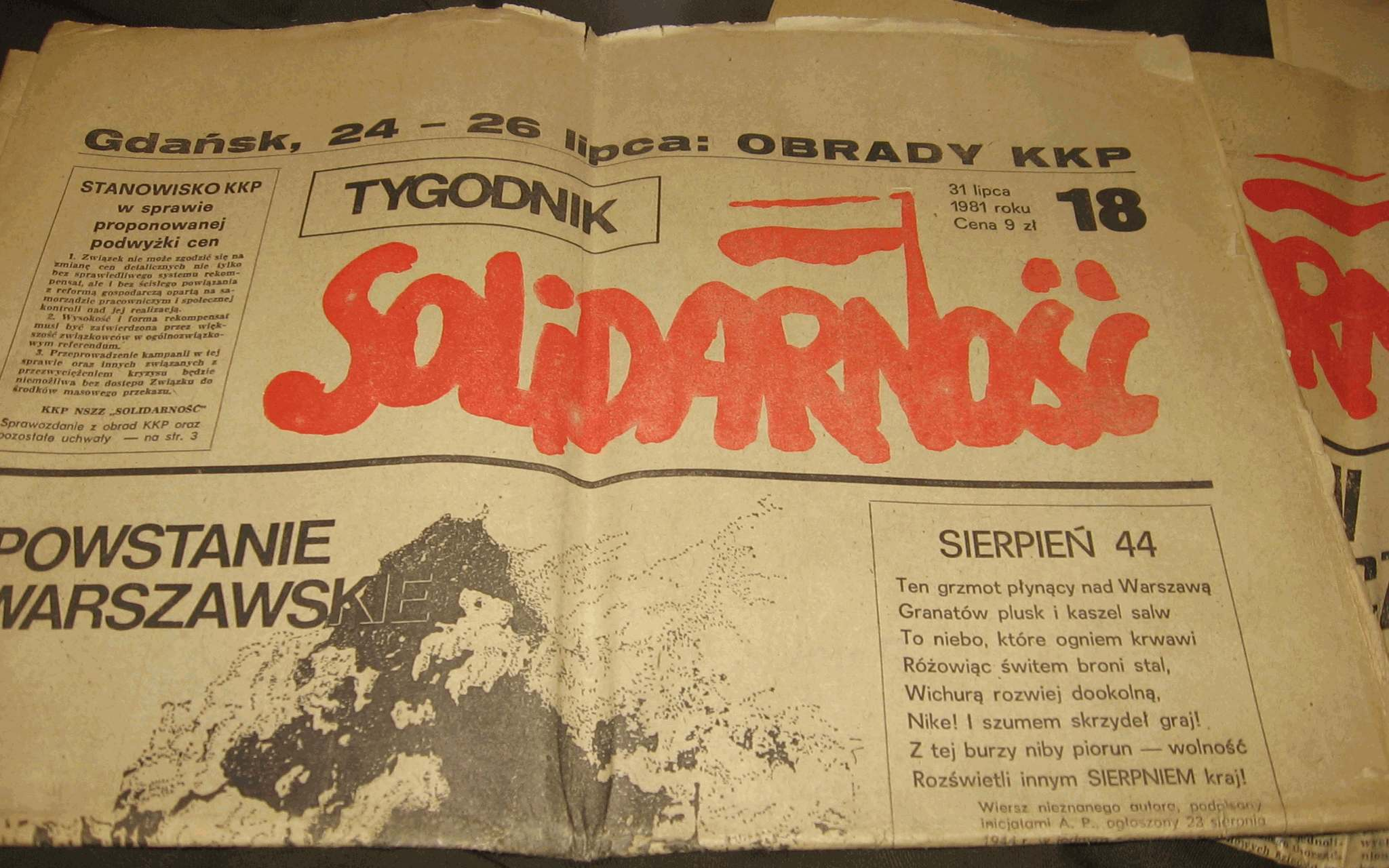
- Category: Sans-serif
- Designer: Jerzy Janiszewski
- Date released: 1980

Solidaryca is a typeface designed in 1980 by Jerzy Janiszewski, at that time a student at the Gdańsk Academy of Fine Arts. Originally it was used as a logo for the Solidarity, an anti-communist trade union in Poland. The characters were meant to represent workers marching together and supporting each other.

The name of the typeface is a pun on Polish words Solidarność (meaning solidarity) and cyrylica (Cyrillic).

With time it was extended to include other characters. While primarily associated with the Solidarity and various ventures associated with it, it is also used by other projects loosely associated with the ideas of fight for freedom. On and around June 4, 2009 most Polish newspapers used the font for their logos, to commemorate the 20th anniversary of Poland's independence and the first (partially) free elections in Eastern Bloc since World War II.

== Gallery ==
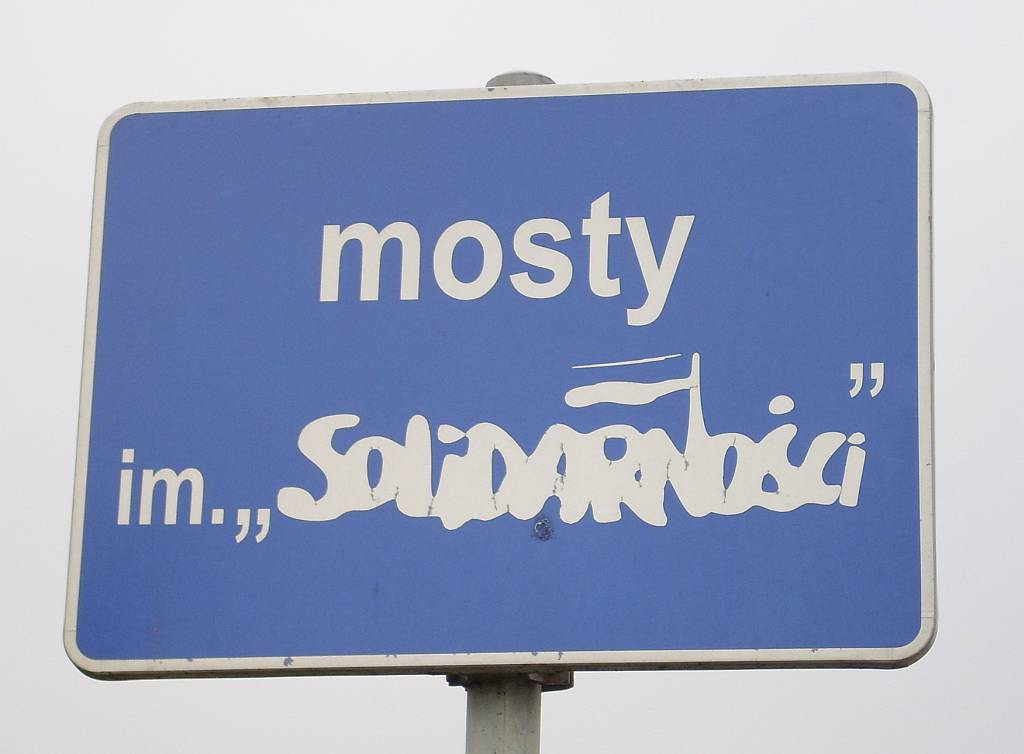
"Solidarity" bridges roadsign

Occupy Wall Street poster
