= Ota =

Ōta, Ota, or Ohta may refer to the following:

== People ==
As a mononym:

- Ota (wife of Arnulf of Carinthia) (c. 874–903), Queen Consort of the East Franks
- Ota (cartoonist) (1954–2021), Brazilian cartoonist

As a family name:

- Atsuya Ota (born 1984), Japanese basketball player
- Fusae Ohta (born 1951), Japanese LDP politician
- Herb Ohta (born 1934), Hawaiian ukulele player
- Hikari Ōta (born 1965), manzai comedian
- Hiromi Ōta (born 1955), Japanese singer and idol
- Jun'ya Ōta (太田 順也; born 1977), known by his penname ZUN, Japanese video game developer and composer
- Keibun Ōta (born 1951), Japanese painter and illustrator
- Kiyoto Ota (太田 清人; born 1948), Japanese-Mexican sculptor
- Michihiko Ohta (born 1964), Japanese singer, composer and arranger
- Minoru Ōta (1891–1945), Japanese admiral in World War II
- Miwa Ota (太田 美和; born 1968), Japanese cross-country skier
- Mizuho Ōta (1876–1955), poet and scholar
- Nanami Ohta (born 1993), Japanese actress
- Nobuko Ota (太田 信子; born 1969), Japanese rower
- Princess Ōta (fl. 7th century), the eldest daughter of emperor Tenji
- Ryu Ota (1930–2009), Japanese New Left activist, author, and ecologist
- Seiichi Ota (1945–2024), Japanese politician
- Shinichi Ota (太田 真一; born 1975), Japanese cyclist
- Shinichiro Ohta (born 1971), Japanese voice actor and television announcer known for the Iron Chef series
- Shusuke Ota (太田 修介; born 1996), Japanese footballer
- Ōta Sukemoto (1799–1867), a daimyō and office holder during the Tokugawa shogunate
- Takako Ōta (born 1967), Japanese voice actress
- Takuya Ōta (太田 拓弥; born 1970), Japanese sport wrestler
- Tetsuharu Ōta (born 1980), Japanese voice actor
- Tomio Ota (太田 富夫; born 1936), Japanese triple jumper
- Tomoko Ohta (born 1933), Japanese molecular evolution scientist
- Toshi Seeger (1922–2013), née Toshi Aline Ohta, an American filmmaker and environmental activist
- Toshio Ōta (1919–1942), Japanese fighter pilot
- Yuki Ota (born 1985), Japanese Olympic fencer
- Yukina Ota (born 1986), Japanese figure skater

As a personal name:

- Ota Halama (born 1974), Czech historian of Christianity
- Ota Zaremba (1957–2026), Czech weightlifter and Olympian

== Geography ==
=== Japan ===
- Ōta, Tokyo (大田, 東京), a Special Ward of the Japanese capital city
- Ōta, Gunma (太田, 群馬), a city northwest of Tokyo in the Gunma prefecture
- Ōta River (太田川), the major river in the Hiroshima prefecture

=== Other places ===
- Okhta River (Neva basin), a river in Russia
- Ota (Alenquer), a town and a parish in the municipality of Alenquer, near Lisbon, Portugal
- Ota, Corse-du-Sud, a municipality in south Corsica, France
- Ota, Ogun State, a city in Nigeria
- Ota Airport, Portugal

== Companies ==
- Ohta Jidosha, one of the largest Japanese automotive manufacturing companies in the 1930s
- Ohta Publishing, Japanese publishing company
- OHTA, for Organ Historical Trust of Australia
- Ota (restaurant), a sushi counter in Omaha, Nebraska

== Fictional characters ==
- Akihiko Ohta, the owner of a grocery store in the Muteki Kanban Musume manga series
- Isao Ohta, a police pilot in the Patlabor anime and manga franchise
- Ota Matsushita, a character in AI: The Somnium Files

== Other uses ==
- 5868 Ohta, a main-belt asteroid

== See also ==
- OTA (disambiguation)
- Otta (disambiguation)
- Organisation Undoing Tax Abuse (OUTA)
