= Freedom Party (Poland) =

Polish political party

The Freedom Party (Polish: Partia Wolności), a Polish political party led by Kornel Morawiecki, was founded on 7 July 1990, based on the underground Fighting Solidarity movement. It was a radically anti-communist party, the only one in the Solidarity camp not to recognize the Polish Round Table Agreement. The Freedom Party joined the Movement for the Republic (in the 1993 Polish parliamentary election, it ran as part of the Coalition for the Republic). Many members of the former Freedom Party later joined the Movement for the Reconstruction of Poland.

The Freedom Party advocated for the adoption of a new constitution and the holding of local and presidential elections in 1992 based on it. Membership was barred to individuals who had not resigned from the Polish United Workers' Party after 13 December 1981. The Freedom Party advocated for a 10-year ban on former activists of the PZPR and its satellite organizations from running in parliamentary and local elections or holding leadership positions. It supported Poland's accession to NATO. The party advocated for a reduction in unemployment benefits and the introduction of paid public works. It also advocated for the removal of Leszek Balcerowicz as Minister of Finance and the abolition of the so-called Popiwek.
