= Fighting Solidarity =

Polish anti-communist organization

- Solidarność Walcząca
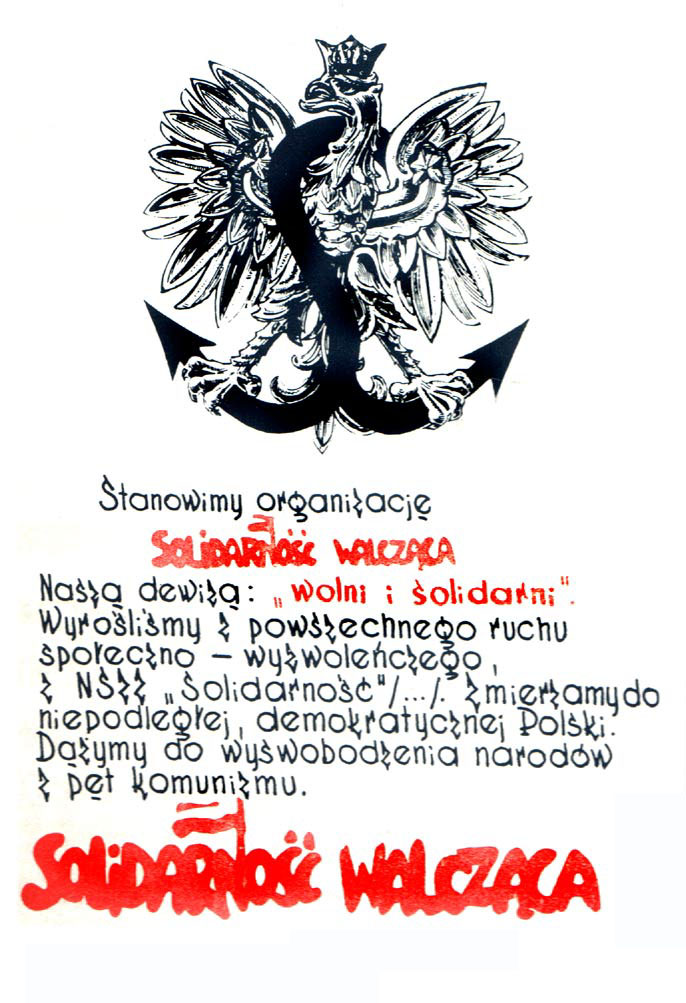
- Fighting Solidarity Poster
- Formation: June 1982; 44 years ago
- Founder: Kornel Morawiecki
- Founded at: Wrocław
- Type: Political
- Purpose: Anti-communism
- Headquarters: Wrocław
- Location: Poland
- Methods: Information warfare
- Publication: Solidarność Walcząca; Biuletyn Dolnośląski; Galicja
- Affiliations: Solidarity

Fighting Solidarity (Polish: Solidarność Walcząca) is a Polish anti-Soviet and anti-communist organization. It was founded in June 1982 by Kornel Morawiecki in the Polish city of Wrocław. Its creation was in response to the de-legalization of the Solidarity movement and associated communist government repression of the opposition symbolized by the imposition of martial law in 1981. Many consider this faction as one of the most radical and uncompromising splinters of the wider Solidarity movement.

Morawiecki and Fighting Solidarity activists envisaged their organization as a successor to the Polish resistance in World War II, hence the symbol of the new movement merged the Solidarity logo with the Kotwica and crowned Polish eagle (symbolically in 1945, the new communist regime removed the crown from the eagle's head on the official coat of arms of the Polish State. Many among the opposition viewed that crown as a symbol of independent, non-communist Poland).

One of the main activities of Fighting Solidarity was information warfare: it printed and distributed many underground newspapers (bibuła). The most well-known of these included Solidarność Walcząca (Wrocław, the main press organ of the organization), Biuletyn Dolnośląski (Wrocław), Solidarność Walcząca (Poznań) and Galicja (Rzeszów). Fighting Solidarity's bibuła were the first such publications printed during the period of martial law, being made available already the next day after the latter had been introduced. Fighting Solidarity also tried to actively infiltrate the Polish secret police (Służba Bezpieczeństwa) and to support other anti-communist organizations, including such organizations in other countries of the Soviet Bloc, even within the Soviet Union itself. The Polish secret police found it extremely hard to infiltrate the new organization, even though they employed various tactics, including the kidnapping of the founder Morawiecki's children in an attempt to blackmail him. Despite its name and (undeserved) reputation for militancy, Fighting Solidarity supported neither violence nor terrorism.

Fighting Solidarity was one of two Polish organizations of that time whose primary goals, declared from the start, included the destruction of communism, the independence of Poland and other nations controlled by communist governments (including those comprising the Soviet Union itself), as well as the reunification of Germany.

Apart from Wrocław, Fighting Solidarity power bases included Poznań, Gdańsk, Rzeszów and Upper Silesia. Among its most prominent members were Andrzej Myc, Wojciech Myślecki, Andrzej Zarach (Wrocław) and Andrzej Kołodziej (Gdynia). In 1986 it claimed to have several hundred active members, not counting among these other allies and supporters.

In 1990 many members of Fighting Solidarity founded a political party, the Partia Wolności (Freedom Party).

== History ==
Fighting Solidarity was established in Wrocław in June 1982 by activists who formed the core of the underground Regional Strike Committee of Solidarity, who disagreed with the leadership of the RKS on methods and strategy of action.

The first successes of the SW were the demonstrations on June 13 and 26, 1982. Thousands of residents took to the streets of Wroclaw at the urging of the editorial board of the magazine "Solidarność Walcząca" (against the position of the Regional Strike Committee). The demonstrations turned into street battles that lasted for hours, barricades were erected, often forcing ZOMO troops to withdraw. SW was a co-organizer of Wroclaw's largest martial law demonstration on August 31, 1982, with live coverage of the demonstration broadcast by Radio SW.

Fighting Solidarity's role in social resistance grew to such an extent that the Security Service (SB) considered it a threat to the system. In August 1985, SB chief, Gen. Władysław Ciastoń made a decision to "identify, work out and liquidate the Solidarity Fighting Organization," engaging "all organizational units of the Security Service" in action against it. The nationwide crackdown on the SW was given the code name "Octopussy". This was the largest operation of the Interior Ministry since 1981. Despite the involvement of large forces by the secret service, there was no significant reduction in the activities of the "Solidarność Walcząca". Solidarity Fighting was also dealt with by the East German STASI as part of the Operational Dissemination Case "Sycylia" ("Sicily"). The Soviet KGB was informed of individual activities.

After Kornel Morawiecki was arrested in October 1987, Andrzej Kołodziej took over as Fighting Solidarity at the time by Andrzej Zarach, Wojciech Myślecki and Zbigniew Jagielło. In May 1988, Morawiecki and Kolodziej were deported from Poland. After a political trip to several countries (UK, France, Italy, USA), Morawiecki returned illegally to Poland and to the underground, once again assuming leadership of the Fighting Solidarity.

In 1989, Fighting Solidarity opposed the agreement with the communists, which was joined by part of the opposition in Poland (the "round table"), motivated by moral and political reasons.

In 1990, the Freedom Party was formed from among the activists and milieu of the Fighting Solidarity. The Freedom Party's candidate for president, Kornel Morawiecki, failed to collect the required 100,000 signatures after submitting his candidacy. During the televised election campaign, he demonstratively overturned the round table in front of TV cameras.

The organization was formally dissolved in 1992. On January 17, 2007, the Combatant Solidarity Association was established.

On June 15, 2007, 76 leading activists of Solidarność Walcząca were decorated with the Crosses of Rebirth of Poland by Polish President Lech Kaczyński.

On July 4, 2009, in Vilnius, five activists of the Autonomous Eastern Department of Solidarność Walcząca were awarded the Medal of the Order for Meritorious Service to Lithuania by the President of Lithuania Valdas Adamkus (Jadwiga Chmielowska, Tadeusz Markiewicz, Maciej Ruszczyński, Piotr Pacholski, Piotr Hlebowicz).

== Organization ==
The main figure, chairman and creator of the Fighting Solidarity's ideological foundations was Kornel Morawiecki. The founders of the SW and the most active activists in Wrocław included: Paweł Falicki, Michał Gabryel, Andrzej Kisielewicz, Maria Koziebrodzka, Romuald Lazarowicz, Piotr Bielawski, Cezariusz Lesisz, Halina Łopuszańska, Hanna Łukowska-Karniej, Zofia Maciejewska, Stanisław Mittek, Andrzej Myc, Wojciech Myślecki, Romuald Nowicki, Zbigniew Oziewicz, Jan Pawłowski, Barbara Sarapuk, Władysław Sidorowicz, Tadeusz Świerczewski, Andrzej Zarach.

The SW was headed by a Council (mainly comprising the founders) and - since 1984. - Executive Committee.

Among a dozen Fighting Solidarity branches, the strongest - besides Wroclaw - were Poznań, Gdańsk, Rzeszów and Upper Silesia. Leading activists outside Lower Silesia were Maciej Frankiewicz (Poznań), Marek Czachor, Andrzej Kołodziej, Roman Zwiercan and Ewa Kubasiewicz (Tricity), Sławomir Bugajski (Katowice), Janina Jadwiga Chmielowska (Sosnowiec), Krzysztof Korczak (Szczecin), Antoni Kopaczewski and Janusz Szkutnik (Rzeszów), Seweryn Jaworski, Krzysztof Wolf, Adam Cymborski and Adam Borowski (Warsaw), Marian Stachniuk and Piotr Hlebowicz (Cracow), Włodzimierz Domagalski-Łabędzki (Łódź). "Solidarność Walcząca" cells also existed in many other cities, including Zgorzelec, Częstochowa, Jelenia Góra, Kalisz, Kielce, Konin, Opole, Wałbrzych. In addition to regional structures, the SW also formed plant groups (including at the Cegielski Plant in Poznań, the Komuna-Paris Shipyard in Gdynia, the Gdańsk Shipyard, the "Wrozamet" in Wrocław, the Jelcz Car Works, and several Silesian and Walbrzych mines). The organization had about 2,000 members.

Outside of Poland, Fighting Solidarity was represented by foreign representatives Tadeusz Warsza (Great Britain), Andrzej Wirga (Germany), Ewa Kubasiewicz (head of representation) and Rafał Gan-Ganowicz (France), Jerzy Jankowski (Norway), Kazimierz Michalczyk (West Berlin), Zbigniew Bełz (Canada), Jaroslaw Swiatek (USA).

== Fighting Solidarity’s agenda ==
Solidarność Walcząca operated on the basis of the Program of the Organization of Solidarność Walcząca created since 1982, the most complete version of which was published in 1987. Since its inception, its program proclaimed the complete collapse of communism, the independence of Poland and other nations enslaved by communism, the independence of the Soviet republics, the unification of Germany while maintaining the post-war borders imposed by the Yalta order. In proposing a vision of Poland after the collapse of communism, Solidarność Walcząca emphasized the need for social solidarity and self-government, and appealed to values derived from the teachings of the Catholic Church.

== See also ==
- Confederation of Independent Poland (Konfederacja Polski Niepodległej)
- Cursed soldiers
- Orange Alternative (Pomarańczowa Alternatywa)
