= Nokia 103 =

Mobile phone model

- Also known as: RM-643
- Manufacturer: Nokia
- Type: Basic phone
- Series: Nokia 3-digit series
- Availability by region: April 2012
- Predecessor: Nokia 1280
- Successor: Nokia 106
- Compatible networks: GSM 900, GSM 1800
- Form factor: Monoblock
- Colors: Blue, Orange
- Dimensions: 107.2×45.1×15.3 mm (4.22×1.78×0.60 in)
- Weight: 76.6 g (2.70 oz)
- Operating system: Series 30
- Battery: Li-Ion BL-5CB 800mAh
- Display: 96 x 68 pixels, 1.36 inches (~87 ppi pixel density)
- Data inputs: Keypad

The Nokia 103 is a mobile phone manufactured by Nokia in Hungary and released for sale in April 2012, where some produced in India. It is a basic model phone. As an additional feature, this phone has a built in flashlight.

It was the last Nokia phone with monochrome display after Nokia 1280.

== Technical specifications ==
Feature	Specification
Frequency	GSM network: 900 MHz, 1800 MHz GSM max data speed DL: EGPRS 236.8 kbit/s GSM max data speed UL: EGPRS 59.2 kbit/s Note: mobile data not supported.
Display	Display size: 1.4" Display resolution: 96 x 68 Display colors: Monochrome (1-bit/2) Display technology: LCD height: 68.0 mm Display width: 96.0 mm
User interface	Series 30 user interface
Multimedia	Stereo FM radio,
Call log	Yes
Memory functions	RAM: 384 kB
Messaging	Text messaging only. Multimedia (MMS) not available
Ringing Tones	64-chord/voice polyphonic MIDI ringing tones
Voice Features	Speech codecs: GSM FR, GSM HR, AMR-NB, AMR-WB
Battery	Standard battery, Li-Ion 800mAh (BL-5CB), Voltage : 3.7V Stand-by Up to 30 days, Talk time Up to 12.8 h
Connectors	Charging connectors: 2.0 mm Charging Connector AV connectors: 3.5 mm Nokia AV Connector
