= Jan Waszkiewicz =

Polish politician (1944–2021)

- Born: June 24, 1944; Kielce, Poland
- Died: March 25, 2021 (aged 77); Wrocław, Poland
- Education: Wrocław University; Institute of Mathematics, Polish Academy of Sciences; Jagiellonian University
- Known for: Nonclassical logic, History of mathematics
- Awards: The Dicktein Prize of PMS (1991)
- Scientific career
- Fields: Mathematics
- Workplaces: Wrocław University of Science and Technology
- Thesis: On the theory of products of generalized relational systems; Cultural dependencies of the genesis of mathematics (1972, 1990)
- Doctoral advisor: Czesław Ryll-Nardzewski

Jan Waszkiewicz (June 24, 1944 – March 25, 2021) was a Polish politician and regional official, academic, and marshal of the Lower Silesian Voivodeship.

He graduated from the University of Wrocław in 1966. After graduating, he worked at the Pedagogical University in Opole, then moved to the Wrocław University, where he worked until 1969. For the next three years he was a doctoral student at the Institute of Mathematics, Polish Academy of Sciences in Warsaw. He obtained his doctorate from Institute of Mathematics of the Polish Academy of Sciences in 1972, based on the work On the theory of products of generalized relational systems written under the direction Czesław Ryll-Nardzewski. In 1972, he returned to Wrocław and started working at the Wrocław University of Technology. In 1990, he also defended the dissertation Cultural dependencies of the genesis of mathematics before the council of the Faculty of Philosophy and History of the Jagiellonian University, obtaining the degree of habilitated doctor. His papers are referenced in the mathematical databases. From 2001, he was a professor at the Institute of Organization and Management of the Wrocław University of Science and Technology.

Waszkiewicz was recognized by the Samuel Dickstein Prize of Polish Mathematical Society

Between 1979 and 1990 he was the chief co-editor, together with Kornel Morawiecki of the anti-communist underground newspaper Biuletyn Dolnośląski.

Waszkiewicz died of COVID-19 in Wrocław on March 25, 2021, during the COVID-19 pandemic in Poland.
