= Operator logo =

An operator logo is a logo which appears on the status screen of a mobile phone. Originally intended as a way for phone companies to brand phones attached to their networks, the operator logo has since become a method by which owners may customise their phones to reflect their own interests. It helped kick off mobile phone content advertising which became particularly prominent with ring tone adverts.

== History ==
The older mobile phones of 90's (Black & white LCD Screen) had options to show telecom operator logo instead of the showing the name in plain text. Later various companies provided custom logo and designs to set as Operator logo. These logos can be shared by SMS with other people.

Later on when color mobiles came to market, Colorful logo option came to mobile devices. An industry has sprung up around the use of these logos, and around ring tones, tailored towards phones, such as those made by Nokia, which can receive new logos in a text message.

Several mobile phone companies provide services on their websites where users can design their own logos, and there is also software available which can be used to create them.

== See also ==
- OTA bitmap
- Smart Messaging
