= Nokia 1280 =

Mobile phone developed by Nokia

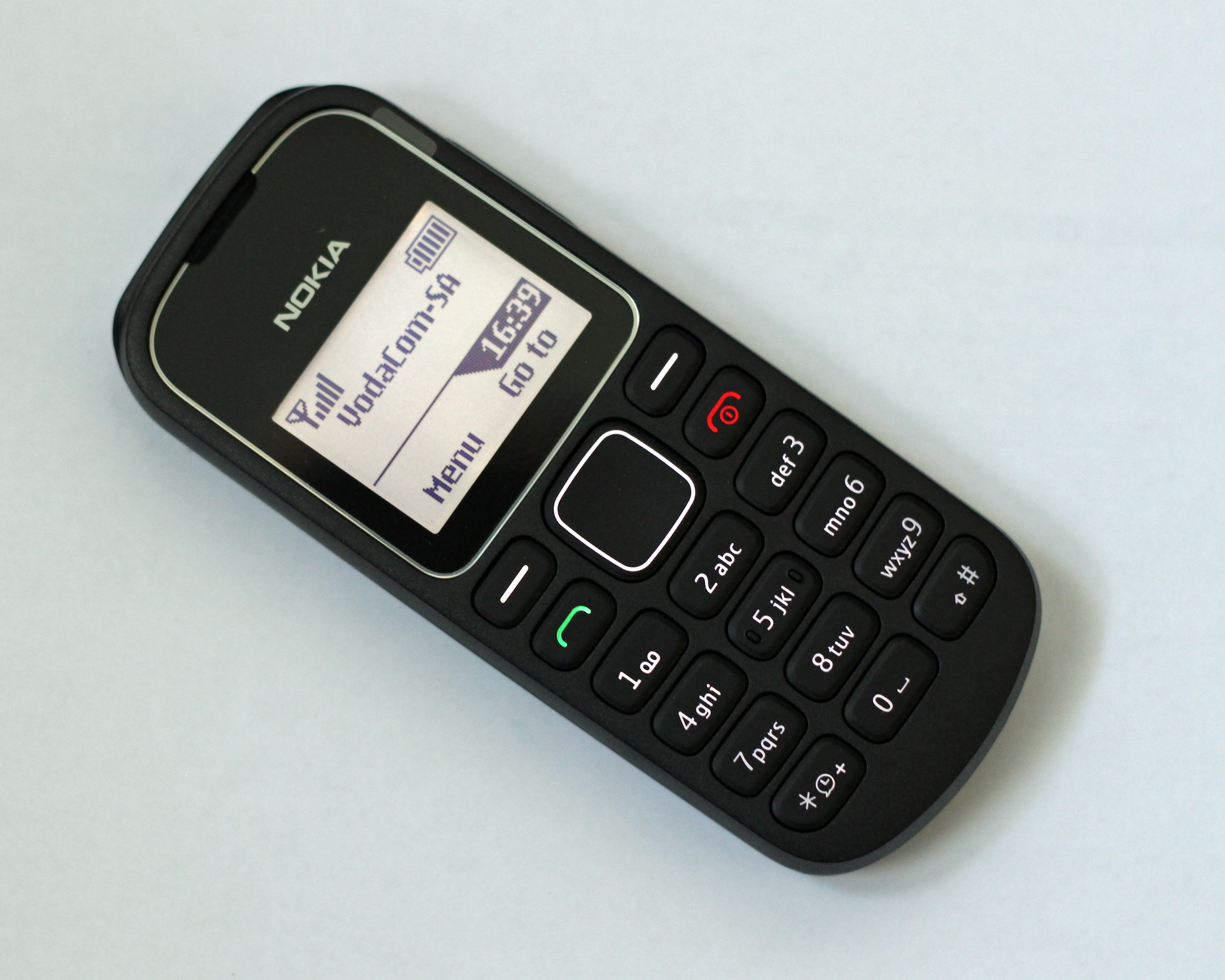
- Manufacturer: Nokia
- Series: Nokia 1000 series
- First released: March 2010
- Availability by region: Pakistan, India, Philippines, South Africa, Russia, Bangladesh, Vietnam
- Predecessor: Nokia 1202; Nokia 1203
- Successor: Nokia 103
- Form factor: Candybar
- Dimensions: 4.22 x 1.78 x 0.60 inches (107.2 x 45.1 x 15.3 mm)
- Weight: ~82 g
- Operating system: Series 30
- Battery: Li-Ion 850 mAh battery (BL-5CB)
- Display: Monochrome 96 x 68 pixels, 1.36 inches
- Connectivity: 3.5 mm AV connector

The Nokia 1280 is an affordable ultrabasic dual-band GSM mobile phone by Nokia. It was announced in November 2009 and released in March 2010 for developing countries. It has a classic candybar design, intended to be lightweight and durable. Its related twin is the Nokia 103, which was released in 2012 in developed markets.

== Specifications ==
The device has a monochrome display, earpiece, mono loudspeaker, top flashlight, microphone, charging port, headset connector, and a keypad, end/power, call, navigation and selection keys. The hardware specifications are:

- Body
  - Dimensions: 107.2 mm x 45.1 mm x 15.3 mm (L x W x H)
  - Weight: 81.92 g (with battery)
  - Volume: 62.27 cm^{3}
- Display: Monochrome LCD
  - Display Size: 5.6 cm^{2}
  - Resolution: 96 x 68 pixels
- Battery: Li-Ion 850 mAh battery (BL-5CB)
  - Standby time: Up to 528 hours (22 days)
  - Talk time: Up to 8.5 hours
- Network: 2G Network 800/900/1800 MHz

=== Other features ===
Built-in FM radio, SMS, backlight, vibration, internet antenna, and exchangeable color covers.

== Software ==
The Nokia 1280 uses the Series 30 software platform. The main features of the phone are accessed through the Menu, which include: Messages, Contacts, Call register, Settings, Clock, Radio, Reminders, Games, Extras, and SIM services. Voice memo, multiple phonebooks, predictive text input, FM radio, are supported on this device. Calculator, calendar, reminders, and alarms can also be used. Three games are included in this device.

=== Games ===
- Bounce
- Snake Xenzia
- Rapid Roll (Note: Only available in certain regions.)
- Beach Rally
- Sudoku
- Forbidden Treasures
- Soccer League
