= Solidarity logo =

Solidarity logo

The Solidarity logo designed by Jerzy Janiszewski and K. Janiszewski in 1980 is considered as an important example of Polish Poster School creations. The poster was made originally for the August 1980 Lenin shipyard strike which took place in their hometown of Gdansk.

== Overview ==
According to the artist, the letters were designed to represent united individuals. This characteristic typeface, known as solidaryca ("Solidaric"), was implemented many times in posters and other pieces of art in different contexts. Notable examples include a film poster for Man of Iron by Andrzej Wajda and, in 1989, a poster by Tomasz Sarnecki designed for the first (semi) free elections in Poland.

== Recognition ==
The logo was awarded the Grand Prix of the Biennale of Posters, Katowice 1981. By that time it was already well known in Poland and had become an internationally recognized icon.

== See also ==
- Operator logo
