= Ota (restaurant) =

Restaurant in Omaha, Nebraska

Coordinates: 41.2849°N 96.0054°W

- Interactive map of Ota

Restaurant information
- Established: July 2, 2023
- Owner: David Utterback
- Food type: Sushi
- Location: 6011 Maple St, Omaha, Nebraska, 68104, United States

Ota is a sushi restaurant in Omaha, Nebraska.

Ota is an eight-seat sushi counter that opened in July 2023. It is known for a creative exploration of the concept of sushi.

The restaurant is owned by David Utterback, and is named after his mother. He owns two other Japanese restaurants in Omaha, including Yoshitomo, which opened in 2017 and is located next door to Ota in a former Subway location, and Koji, a yakitori restaurant. In 2023 Utterback was the first chef in Nebraska to be named a finalist for a James Beard Award.

In 2023, The Washington Post called Ota one of the country's best sushi restaurants.
