= Smart Messaging =

SMS service developed by Nokia

Smart messaging is a proprietary service developed by Nokia used for the sending and receiving of various digital media via SMS.

== Graphical ==
=== Picture message ===
A monochrome picture that can be sent between handsets as a series of SMS messages. The typical size of a picture message is 72x28 pixels, which is sent as three separate SMS messages. Most Monochrome Nokia handsets allow the picture message to act as a screensaver. Most color ones do not.

The picture message uses an implementation of the OTA bitmap.

=== Operator logo ===
A monochrome picture that can be sent to a handset via an SMS gateway as either a single or a series of concatenated SMS messages. The typical size of an Operator Logo is 72x14 pixels, which is sent as two separate SMS messages.

Operator Logos sit in the middle of the screen and disappear when coverage is lost. The original intent of Operator Logos was to allow a Network Operator or MVNO to replace the name of their network (as stored on the SIM card) with their graphical logo, but human nature being what it is, people now usually get one that represents them rather than their network.

There is a workaround that allows a standard size Operator Logo to be sent as a single message, however, compatibility with newer or non-Nokia phones is uncertain. A more accurate way of reducing the cost of sending Operator Logos is to reduce their size to 72x13 pixels. This size would be sent as a single message.

The Operator Logo uses an implementation of the OTA bitmap.

=== CLI icon / Group logo ===
A monochrome picture that can be sent to a handset via an SMS gateway as either a single or a series of concatenated SMS messages. The typical size of a picture message is 72x14 pixels, which is sent as a single separate SMS message.

A CLI Icon is a picture that will display on the handset when a call is received from someone whose number is stored in the handset as part of the corresponding 'group' (e.g. friends, colleagues, clients, etc.). The CLI Icon uses an implementation of the OTA bitmap.

== Internal structure ==
The content of each smart message sent is divided into two parts. The data header and the data content.

=== Data header ===
The Data header is again divided into two parts, the first part is exceptionally small, only one byte in length, and defines the total length of the header.

After this there are one or more 'Information Elements', these tell the phone what to do with the information when it receives it. The two most common Information Elements are for Port Number Addressing (code 05) and concatenation (code 00) (telling the phone how to put together two or more SMS messages to make a single message).

The first byte of the Information Element Identifies (IEI) what information is to follow. The second byte of the Information Element is the 'Information Element Data Length' or IEDL. It tells the phone how many of the following bytes are part of the Information Identifier. The third and subsequent bytes of the Information Element are the actual information being conveyed. This is called the IED or Information Element Data.

A valid example of a Smart Message Header, expressed in hex is 0B0504158200000003010201.

This means:

 0B 0B is hex for 11. There are 11 more bytes to follow.
 05 This is the code for port addressing.
 04 The next 4 bytes of data belong to this Information Element
 15 82 Send it to Port 1582 (in other words, it is an Operator Logo)
 00 00 It was sent from Port 0000. This is not relevant for most Smart Message types, but must be included nonetheless
 00 This is the code for Concatenation. This content is being sent as multiple SMS messages
 03 Three more bytes of information belong to this Information Element.
 01 Message Reference No. If two or more items are being sent, giving them different reference numbers makes sure the phone knows which SMS messages belong to which Smart Message.
 02 Overall, there are two messages.
 01 This is the first message in the sequence.

=== Data content ===
The data content varies depending on the type of smart message. With graphical types, it contains the OTA bitmap, and sometimes other information such as the mobile country code and Mobile Network Code. For ringtones, it contains the music etc.

== See also ==
- Enhanced Messaging Service
- SMS barcode
