= Jerzy Janiszewski =

Polish artist

Jerzy Janiszewski (born 11 March 1952 in Płock) is a Polish artist, best known for designing the Solidarity logo in 1980.

He received a degree of Gdansk Academy of Fine Arts in 1976. His creations include logotypes, posters, scenographies and open-air installations.
