= Nokia 8210 =

Cell phone model

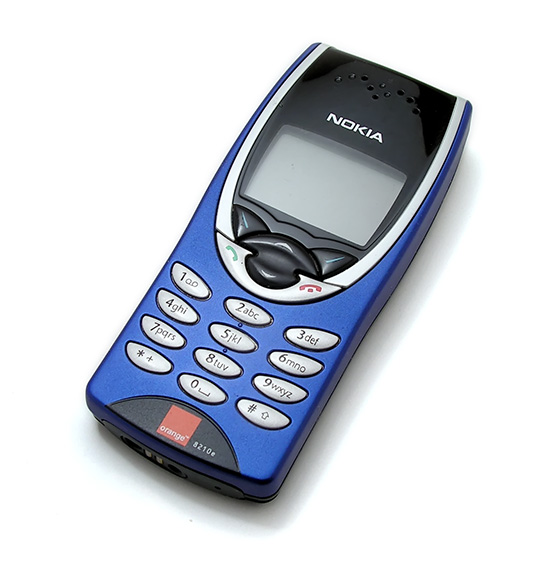
- The Nokia 8210 with a blue cover.
- Manufacturer: Nokia
- First released: November 1999
- Discontinued: 2004
- Predecessor: Nokia 8810 (8210/8260/8290); Nokia 8860 (8250/8270)
- Successor: Nokia 2100 (8270); Nokia 3610 (8250); Nokia 6500 (8265i); Nokia 6510 (8265); Nokia 6590 (8280); Nokia 6590i (8280i); Nokia 8210 4G (revival); Nokia 8310 (8210); Nokia 8390 (8290)
- Related: Nokia 7110; Nokia 8850
- Compatible networks: GSM 900/1800/1900 (8210/8250/8290); TDMA 850/1900 AMPS 850 (8260/8265/8265i); CDMA 1900 (8270/8277)
- Form factor: Candybar
- Dimensions: 101.5 mm × 44.5 mm × 17.4 mm (4.00 in × 1.75 in × 0.69 in)
- Weight: 79 g (2.8 oz)
- Operating system: Series 20
- Storage: up to 250 contacts
- Battery: 650 mAh Li-Ion (BLB-2), replaceable
- Display: Monochrome
- Sound: Headset connector
- Connectivity: Infrared (IrDA)
- Data inputs: Keypad
- Other: Xpress-on covers

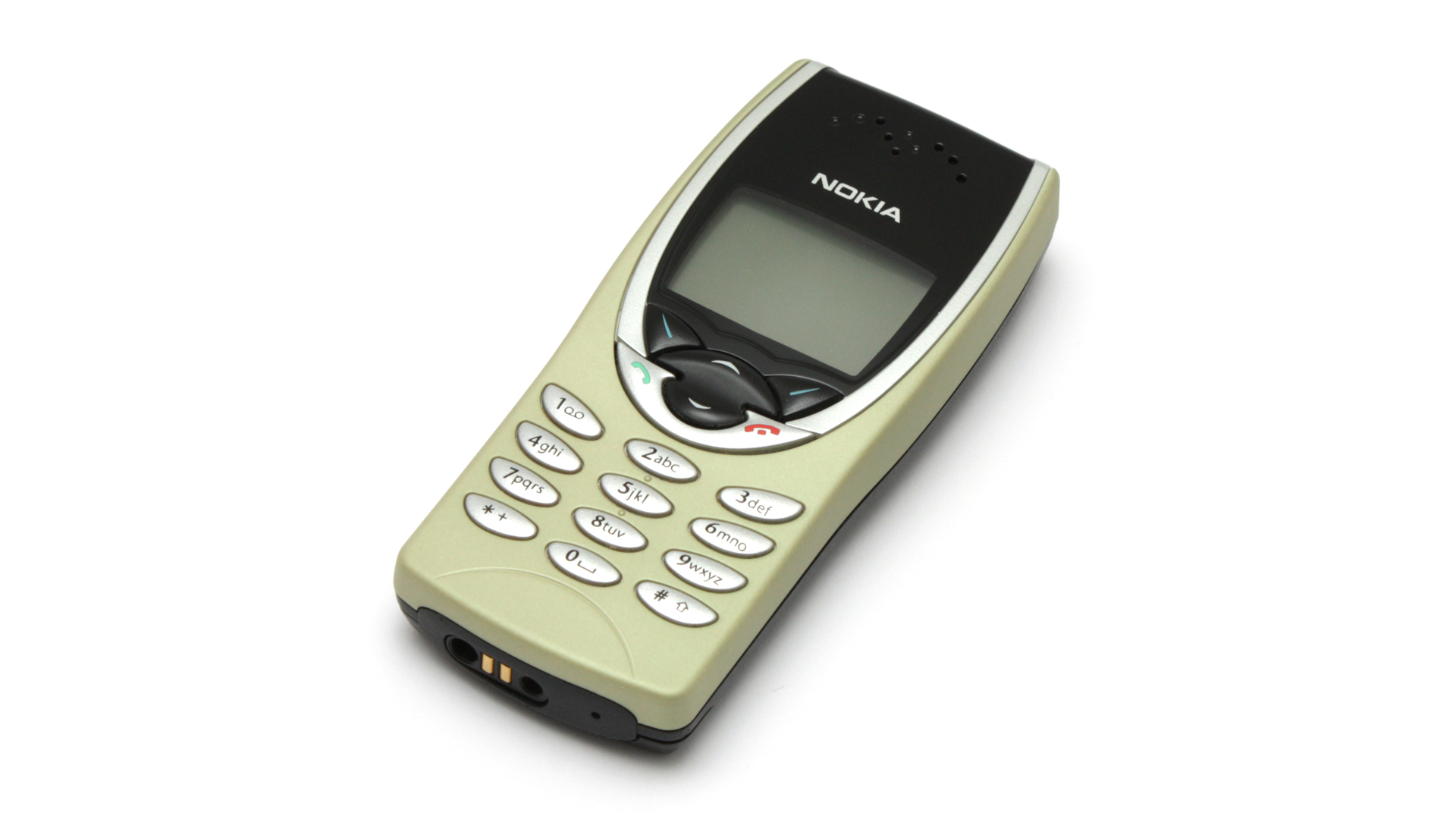
Nokia 8210

Nokia 8210 is a mobile phone developed by Nokia. Announced on 8 October 1999 at the Paris Fashion Week, it was the world's smallest and lightest (at 79 grams) mobile phone at the time. Conceived during a time of miniaturization, the Nokia 8210 outdid rival products Motorola V3688 and Ericsson T28 - unlike those, it was created in a candybar form without moving parts and even without a protruding antenna, making it overall look significantly smaller than the average handset of the time.

Designed by Frank Nuovo, the 8210 was introduced in collaboration with Kenzo during its 30th anniversary. The phone has elements of the premium luxurious Nokia 8810 phone and the consumer grade Nokia 3210. In addition to its size, the Nokia 8210's primary selling point of its design was its removable cover that allowed for easy customization. Six differently coloured Xpress-on covers are available, as well as many third-party ones.

Nokia 8210 uses the GSM 900/1800 band, supports the Extended GSM 900 band (EGSM), and can automatically switch between bands.

== Features ==
=== Design ===
The phone weighs 79 g (with a lithium battery) and is 101.5 mm long, 44.5 mm wide and 17.4 mm thick. It has a green frontlit monochrome display (the keypad is also illuminated green).

The volume has ten levels, and is controlled via a grey button on the top left side of the phone. The base of the phone contains the charger and headset connector.

=== Call management ===
The phone has a speed dial feature, in which the user can assign a name to each key on the keypad (except key 1, which is used for calling voicemail). Voice dialing can also be used by assigning up to 8 voice tags to a name. Dialed, received, and missed calls are all registered, and calls can be diverted.

=== Messaging ===
The phone uses SMS (Short Message Service) with predictive text input, with support for major European languages. Messages can be up to 160 characters long. Compatible handsets can send and receive OTA bitmap picture messages (not MMS).

=== Memory ===
The device's memory can store up to 250 names. Alternately, a SIM card can be used to store names (although memory capacity is specific to each SIM card). The calendar can store up to 50 notes.

=== Infrared ===
Nokia 8210 features an infrared port on the lower left side, which can be used to communicate with a compatible PC or printer using IrDA technology. The infrared port can also be used to transfer names and phone numbers or business cards between compatible phones. Data is transferred at 9.6 kilobits per second.

The infrared connection can also be used to play two-player Snake with another supported phone.

=== Games ===
The phone has four games: Memory, Snake, Logic and Rotation. The infrared connection can be used to play two-way Snake with a compatible device.

=== Issues ===
The 8210 (alongside its other variants) had several design flaws, among them a tendency to develop "screen fade", in which the connector for the display would shrink, and figures on the display would become so dim that it was impossible to read them.

== Variants ==
=== GSM variants – Nokia 8250 and 8290 ===
Available in the first quarter of 2001, Nokia 8250 is a variant of Nokia 8210 designed for Asian Pacific markets, sporting a slightly different design and a blue backlight, as well as EGSM (Extended GSM) support. It has a ringtone composer, and supports downloadable personal profiles, including ringtones and screensavers.

Another GSM version of Nokia 8210 is Nokia 8290, designed for the North American market using single-band GSM-1900.

=== D-AMPS (TDMA)/AMPS – Nokia 8260, 8265, and 8265i ===
Nokia 8260 is a variant of the 8290 designed for IS-136 "TDMA"/AMPS networks in North America. The 8260, weighing 3.4 ounces, is slightly heavier and larger than the 8290 at 2.8 ounces. Unlike the 8290, the 8260 does not feature voice dialing, an infrared port, or officially interchangeable faceplates.

Nokia 8265 is an updated version of the 8260, sporting an updated design. New features include picture messaging and a white backlight. Nokia 8265i adds a WAP browser and switches to a blue backlight.

=== CDMA2000 – Nokia 8270 and 8277 ===
Nokia 8270 is a related CDMA2000 model with a similar design to the Asian-market Nokia 8250. It operates on the CDMA2000 1900 frequency. Like the 8250, the 8270 features a blue backlight. However, it does not feature an infrared port. In its time, this phone was a great hit with many people. It had a cult status in the early 2000s Australia and New Zealand due to its size and backlight, and was nicknamed "Nokia Blue".

Another CDMA2000 version of Nokia 8270 is Nokia 8277, designed for the South Korean market.

== Reception and legacy ==
A blue Nokia 8210 4G

Nokia 8210 continued to be in popular demand well into 2010s by people who want a small phone with long battery life, but with no modern non-mobile connectivity that could be used for tracking, such as the mobile Internet, Wi-Fi, Bluetooth, and NFC. The only wireless option is infrared, allowing for an easy exchange of contacts between compatible devices. As a result, Nokia 8210 and like models command a greater price in the aftermarket.

The 8210 was succeeded by the Nokia 8310 in 2001.

=== Nokia 8210 4G ===
On 12 July 2022, HMD Global announced an updated version of Nokia 8210, the Nokia 8210 4G. The new 8210 supports 4G networks, has a 2.8 inch colour display, 1 GHz CPU, expandable storage, a 0.3 MP camera, and Bluetooth connectivity.
