= Snake (video game genre) =

Video game genre

Snake on a TRS-80

Snake is a genre of action video games where the player maneuvers the end of a growing line, often themed as a snake. The player must keep the snake from colliding with both other obstacles and itself, which gets harder as the snake lengthens.

The genre originated in the 1976 competitive arcade video game Blockade from Gremlin Industries where the goal is to survive longer than the other player does. Blockade and the initial wave of clones that followed were purely abstract and did not use snake terminology. The concept evolved into a single-player variant where a line with a head and tail gets longer with each piece of food eaten—often apples or eggs—increasing the likelihood of self-collision. The simplicity and low technical requirements of snake games have resulted in hundreds of versions, some of which have the word snake or worm in the title. The 1982 Tron arcade video game, based on the film, includes snake gameplay for the single-player Light Cycles segment, and some later snake games borrow the theme.

After a version simply called Snake was preloaded on Nokia mobile phones in 1998, there was a resurgence of interest in snake games.

== Gameplay ==
A single-player game, where both the head and tail move, and each item eaten makes the snake longer

The original Blockade from 1976 and its many clones are two-player games. Viewed from a top-down perspective, each player controls a "snake" with a fixed starting position. The "head" of the snake continually moves forward, unable to stop, growing ever longer. It must be steered left, right, up, and down to avoid hitting walls and the body of either snake. The player who survives the longest wins. Single-player versions are less prevalent and have one or more snakes controlled by the computer, as in the light cycles segment of the 1982 Tron arcade game.

In the most common single-player game, the player's snake is of a certain length, so when the head moves the tail does too. Each item eaten by the snake causes the snake to get longer. Snake Byte has the snake eating apples. Nibbler has the snake eating abstract objects in a maze.

== History ==
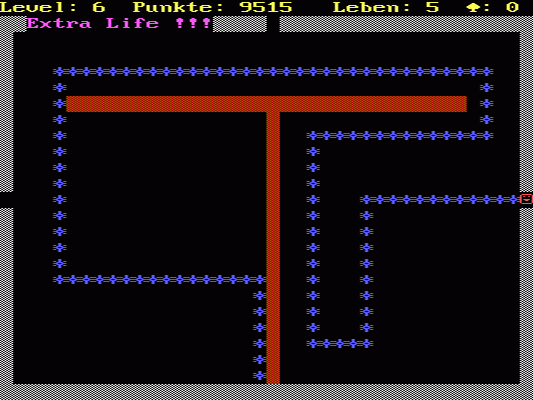
Snake on an IBM PC rendered in a text mode

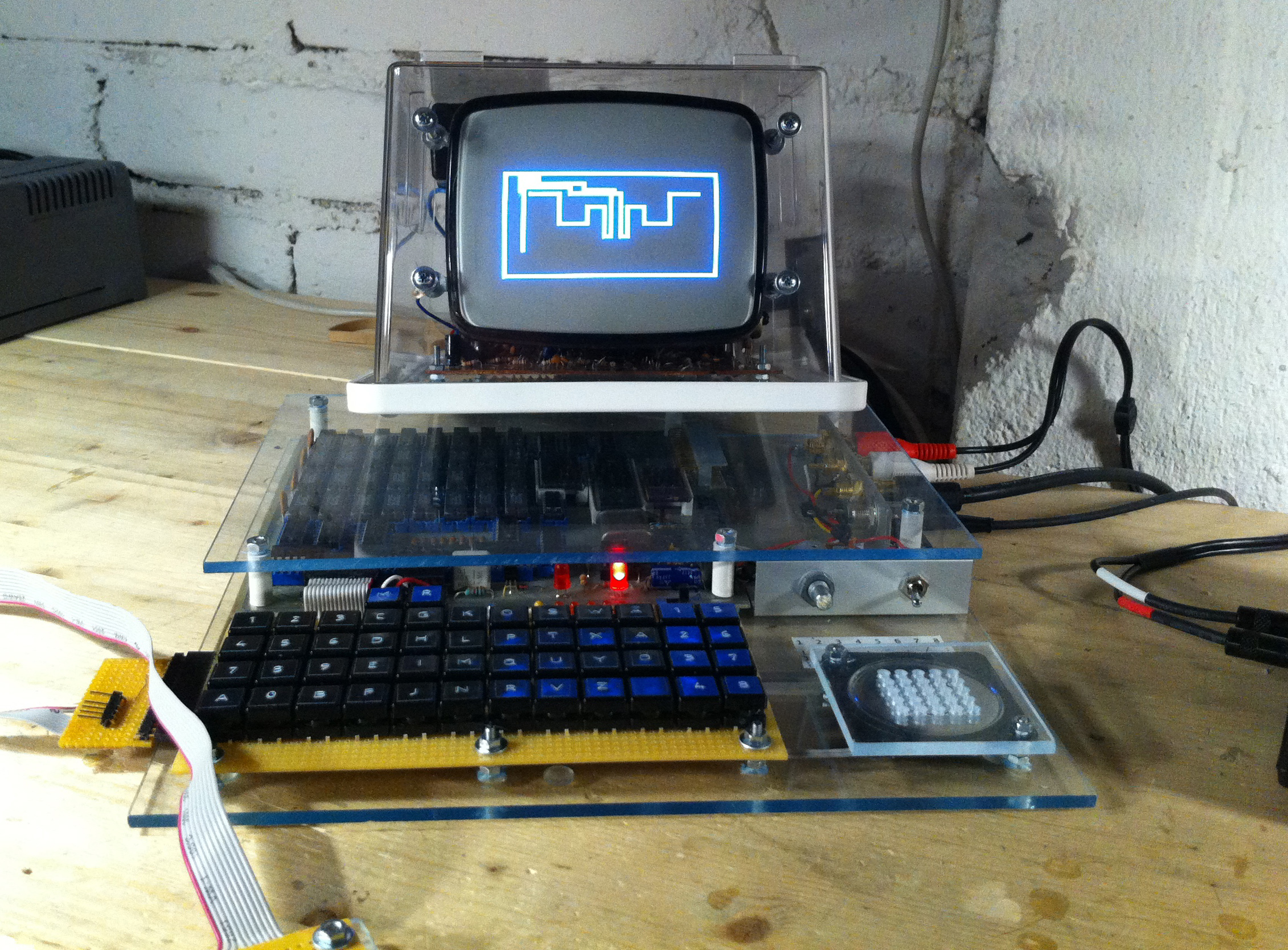
Snake on a Telmac 1800, CHIP-8, published 1978

The Snake genre began with the 1976 arcade video game Blockade written by Lane Hauck and Ago Kiss and published by Gremlin Industries. It was cloned as Bigfoot Bonkers the same year. In 1977, Atari, Inc. released two Blockade-inspired games: the arcade game Dominos and Atari VCS game Surround. Surround was one of the nine Atari VCS launch titles in the US and was sold by Sears under the name Chase. That same year, a similar game was launched for the Bally Astrocade as Checkmate. Mattel released Snafu for the Intellivision console in 1982.

The first known home computer version, Worm, was programmed by Peter Trefonas for the TRS-80 and published by CLOAD magazine in 1978. Versions followed from the same author for the PET and Apple II. An authorized version of the Hustle arcade game, itself a clone of Blockade, was published by Milton Bradley for the TI-99/4A in 1980.

The single-player Snake Byte was published in 1982 for Atari 8-bit computers, Apple II, and VIC-20; a snake eats apples to complete a level, growing longer in the process. In Snake for the BBC Micro (1982), by Dave Bresnen, the snake is controlled using the left and right arrow keys relative to the direction it is heading in. The snake increases in speed as it gets longer, and there is only one life.

Nibbler (1982) is a single-player arcade game where the snake fits tightly into a maze, and the gameplay is faster than most snake designs. Another single-player version is part of the 1982 Tron arcade game, themed with light cycles. It reinvigorated the snake concept, and many subsequent games borrowed the light cycle theme.

Starting in 1991, Nibbles was included with MS-DOS for a period of time as a QBasic sample program. In 1992, Rattler Race was released as part of the second Microsoft Entertainment Pack. It adds enemy snakes to the familiar apple-eating gameplay.

In 1998, the mobile game Snake was released for Nokia 6110. The game was popular, and Nokia released a series of reiterations, including Snake II, Snake EX, Snake EX2, Snake III, Snakes, Snake Xenzia and Snakes Subsonic. As the game graphics and gameplay evolved, it became less popular.

=== Later games ===
In 2002, Snake was made available for download to Pocket PC through Peter's GameBox. In 2004, TIM made Snake available for download through the Tim Wap Fast system. In 2010, a Snake mini-game was also included as a puzzle in the Nokia Symbian exclusive life simulator Creebies. In March 2013, NimbleBit released Nimble Quest, an action RPG snake game. In 2015, Armanto released a spiritual successor to Snake in partnership with Rumilus Design called Snake Rewind. In 2017, Gameloft developed and released the 2017 version of Snake as the pre-installed game for several of Nokia's Series 30+ and KaiOS devices under HMD Global's era, replaced Snake Xenzia. In 2019, scientists tested the touch sensibility of the GLASSES screen cellphones playing Snake. In 2020, Zanco Tiny T2 was launched with Snake installed. In March 2020, OrangePixel released Snake Core with shooter elements. In September 2020, Tree Man Games released PAKO Caravan about a car pulling trailers. In December 2020, Retro Widget released Snake II for iOS home screen and Apple Watch. In 2023, users recreated Snake using GPT-4. In 2023, Spotify added Snake as a downloadable game inside of playlists with more than 20 songs. In 2024, Nothing launched a Snake widget for their cellphones. In March 2024, Pictoline released Quetzi, a snake game where the player controls Quetzalcoatl. In April 2025, Tidepool Games released MageTrain, a roguelike snake game.

A series of online Snake games were made. In 2016, Steve Howse launched Slither.io as a way to mimic the success of Agar.io. In 2016, Kooapps released Snake.io and was later launched on Apple Arcade in 2023. Snake.io was also released on Netflix and Nintendo Switch in 2024. In February 2025, Appxplore (iCandy) released Snaky Cat, an .io battle royale snake game.

Google has incorporated Snake games into its applications. In 2010, YouTube added Snake as a hidden game inside of their video player. In 2013, Google launched Snake doodle as an easter egg for web browsers. In 2019, Google added Snake inside Google Maps as an April Fools' Day prank. In 2019, Google Chrome launched Snake Game for web browsers. Google relaunched Doodle Snake in January 2025 to celebrate the Year of the Snake of the Chinese New Year.

In 2025, the concept of Snake was adapted into an educational context. The open-source game Snakeleev uses the established gameplay mechanics to help students learn the periodic table of elements. The game was developed as part of a science education project and is described in a peer-reviewed article published in the Journal of Chemical Education. A 2025 season of the travel competition series Jet Lag: The Game, played in South Korea, was based on the game design. Python Snake is often used to teach students how to program in Python and Pygame.

== Legacy ==
In 1996, Next Generation ranked it number 41 on their "Top 100 Games of All Time", citing the need for both quick reactions and forethought. In lieu of a title for a specific version, they listed it as "Snake game" in quotes.

On November 29, 2012, the Museum of Modern Art in New York City announced that the Nokia port of Snake was one of 40 games that the curators wished to add to the museum's collection in the future.
