= Samsung SPH-N270 =

Bar style mobile phone released by Samsung in 2003

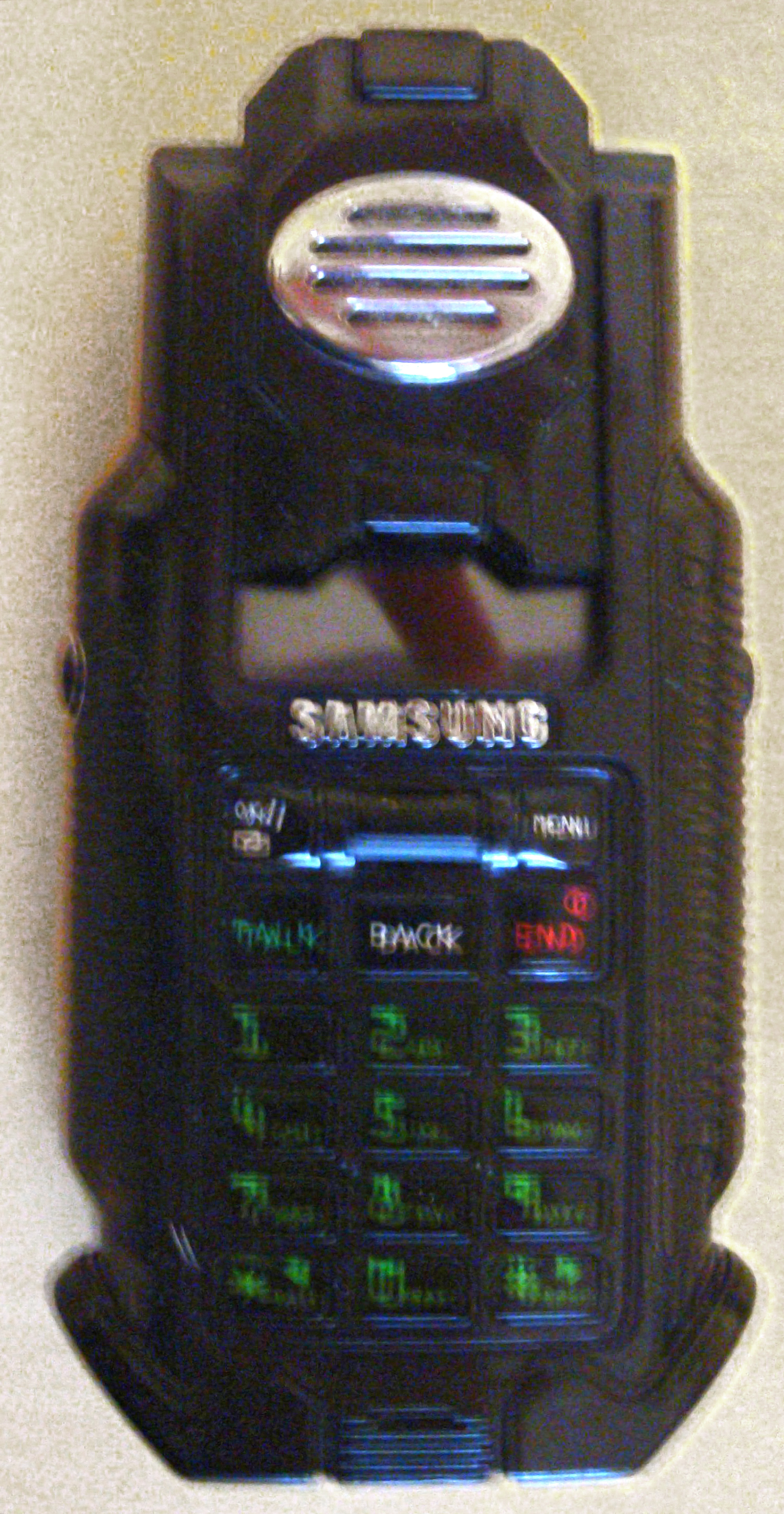
- Manufacturer: Samsung Electronics
- Availability by region: 2003, Discontinued in 2006
- Compatible networks: CDMA 850/1900
- Dimensions: 115 mm×58 mm×20 mm (4.53 x 2.28 x 0.79 inches)
- Weight: 132 g (4.66 oz)
- Operating system: Qualcomm REX
- Battery: 1000mAh lithium ion
- Rear camera: N/A
- Front camera: N/A
- Display: 128 X 160 px TFT LCD, 65,536 colors
- External display: N/A
- Connectivity: USB
- Data inputs: T9, User-independent Voice Command

The Samsung SPH-N270 or Matrix phone is a bar style mobile phone released in 2003, made to resemble the phone used in The Matrix Reloaded. The design crew of the Matrix worked closely with Samsung to develop a phone whose features and release date would coincide with the movie. The SPH-N270 was not intended as a mainstream phone for everyday use. Instead, it was marketed solely to fans of the series as a piece of rare, high quality merchandise.

== Features ==
Perhaps the most remarkable feature of the phone is its spring-loaded earpiece which snaps up to reveal the screen. A small amount of the screen is left visible when the earpiece is down to display important status information. The phone can be configured so that snapping up the earpiece answers an incoming call.

The 1000 mAh lithium ion battery found in the N270 has a backplate matching the Matrix phone, making it somewhat proprietary. Three connectors are present on the SPH-N270. The two ports on the bottom are used for a wall charger/car adapter and a variety of extensions including a USB cable. The port on the top is meant for a headset but most users of the phone do not employ a headset because the SPH-N270 is designed with aesthetics in mind.

Other than physical conveniences, the phone features an assisted GPS receiver, English and Spanish languages, multiple alarms, a calendar, a to-do list and a simple calculator. A notable emphasis of the Samsung SPH-N270 is integration with voice. While 300 contacts stored in the phone can be dialed automatically from the menu, utterance of their names also triggers a phone call. In addition, phone digits can be spoken for contacts not present in the phone book. The phone has an option to match text to the user's speech. Digits displayed on the screen would be read aloud by the user to improve voice recognition. The phone runs on Qualcomm's REX, with Samsung's custom user interface.

== Relation to The Matrix ==
The green code on a black background, made famous by The Matrix (cf. Digital rain), is found in many menus of the phone by default. The phone is mostly made of black plastic and the buttons show stylized green digits. The manual, box and collector's tin also feature the "Matrix code". The charger is the only item in the package with no reference to the Matrix films. It is also the only item in the package compatible with multiple phones.

Samsung is only displayed on the phone's casing and Sprint is only mentioned on-screen when the battery is improperly inserted. When the phone is turned on, the message "WELCOME" is shown, and when the phone is turned off, the message "GOOD BYE" is shown, in a manner reminiscent of Neo's first encounter with the Matrix. Three screensaver themes that come with the phone are Reloaded, The Animatrix, and Camera, even though the SPH-N270 cannot be used as a camera. Several ringtones from the first two Matrix films can be selected along with a beep option and a vibrate option. These ringtones can be applied to contacts individually.

== Criticism ==
=== The Matrix ===
Unlike the Nokia 8110 which appeared in The Matrix but existed already, the SPH-N270 was made specifically to be released in 2003, together with the second Matrix film. Many fans initially pleased with the phone's release expected the phone to be the exact prop used in The Matrix Reloaded. However, the prop used in the film was slightly different and presumably not functional. The phone was used only twice in the movie, but accurate 3D models of it were portrayed in Final Flight of the Osiris and Enter the Matrix. The phone was also noted to be similar, but less functional and less businesslike than the real Nokia "Matrix-Phone" successor at the time, the Nokia 8910i or the experimental Nokia 7650 (released in 2002).

=== Technology ===
Even for 2003, the Matrix phone was by no means a high-end product. While USB transfer was available to some extent, the phone did not support Bluetooth or IrDA and had no video or MP3 capabilities. Many users chose not to buy the phone because it was not web-capable. No web browser or means of sending text messages was included in the firmware. The SPH-N270 is also not a camera phone even though Samsung is regarded highly for its camera-phones.

=== Availability ===
The Samsung N270 was only sold on a special section of the Samsung website running exclusively in Flash. The website has since been taken down as all of the phones have been sold. Rumor has it that only 2,000 Matrix phones were produced and each one was clearly numbered. However, the number of phones actually produced remains in question as serial/production numbers higher than 1500 have not been verified or seen for sale on eBay or through other sites and social media. The phone cost $500 and was restricted for use with Sprint PCS. However, since the phone is considered a highly collectible item, it can sometimes be found on eBay for sale; at the last auction it was sold for 2806 dollars on April 4, 2026. It was also restricted for sale in the U.S., since Sprint PCS is an American network, although many fans have successfully used it in other countries with CDMA networks through analog and digital roaming.
