= Wapworld =

Wapworld was the first commercial mobile internet service to launch in the UK. Conceived and developed by Jingo Communications founder Mark Gibbons, Wapworld provided the first mobile gateway for open internet access to users with WAP-enabled handsets in the UK in 1998.

In December 1999 Jingo took its gateway technology and content portal into a joint venture with The Carphone Warehouse and Bob Geldof to support the UK release of the Nokia 7110 handset.

Wapworld provided a wide range of content - from news, features and entertainment to online travel and the UK's first mobile shopping service in partnership with Waitrose.

Although immediately popular with early adopters, wider market expectations of WAP exceeded the capabilities of the technology and consumer uptake was slow. As a result of resistance from the network operators, and conflicts of interest in the distribution channel, Wapworld closed in 2001. Jingo went on to develop Connect, a pioneering intranet platform, for Bayer, Saatchi & Saatchi, Thomas Cook and BBDO Worldwide and the vote aggregation services behind early reality TV shows including Big Brother.
