= Pako Caravan =

2020 video game

- Developer: Tree Men Games
- Publisher: Tree Men Games
- Platforms: Android iOS; Nintendo Switch
- Release: 8 September 2020
- Genre: Snake
- Mode: Single-player

Pako Caravan is a snake game published by Tree Men Games. It is the fourth game from the Pako series.

== Gameplay ==
The player must collect trailers that are attached to the end of a line, similar to Snake mechanics. The player must avoid hitting obstacles and falling from the scenario. Each level features specific cars depending on the mission the player must complete. As the game progresses, new mechanics are added, such as jumping, mowing the lawn, encountering UFOs or dealing with laboratory experiments. There are ten levels with 100 missions to complete. The Nintendo Switch version features 15 levels.

== Development and release ==
The game was developed in "three or four months" by a team of three developers from Tree Men Games. According to the developers, the idea for the game came from the airport level from Pako - Car Chase Simulator, where a car had to couple trailers behind it.

The game was released on 8 September 2020 for Android and iOS. On 2 March 2021, the game was released for Nintendo Switch.

== Reception ==
In 2021, Pako Caravan was a nominee for the Game Awards.

Pocket Gamer elected Pako Caravan as the second best Snake-like game and the 25th best free mobile game from 2025.

Gamezebo stated that "PAKO Caravan isn't high art, but it doesn't try to be. It offers up a simple concept, does all it can with it – and looks great while doing it".
