= Nokia 8810 =

Mobile phone model

- Manufacturer: Nokia
- First released: March 1998
- Predecessor: Nokia 8110 (8810); Nokia 8110i (8860)
- Successor: Nokia 8210 (8810); Nokia 8250 (8860); Nokia 8260 (8810); Nokia 8270 (8860); Nokia 8290 (8810); Nokia 8850 (8810); Nokia 8855 (8860); Nokia 8890 (8810)
- Compatible networks: GSM
- Form factor: Slider
- Dimensions: 107×46×18 mm (4.21×1.81×0.71 in)
- Weight: 118 g (4 oz) (600 Ni-Mh battery), 98g (400 lithium-ion battery)
- Battery: 600 mAh Ni-Mh or 400 mAh lithium
- Display: Monochrome graphic
- Connectivity: Infrared port

The Nokia 8810 is a discontinued slider-style mobile phone announced and manufactured by Nokia in 1998. It is notable for being among the first mainstream mobile devices to have an internal antenna.

== Design ==
Chrome plated and designed as Nokia's first premium phone, the 8810 weighed 118g with the standard Ni-Mh battery and 98g with the lithium-ion battery, with dimensions of 107×46×18mm. The phone contained a few extra features: a clock, an alarm, Snake, and could display any of 32 different languages.

It had no external whip or stub antenna- unusual for the time and a first for Nokia- and instead featured an internal antenna that enabled the phone to be stored comfortably in a pocket upside down. It was encased entirely in plastic parts, with the keypad concealed behind a slidable plastic interface. This new appearance, in particular the lack of an external antenna, meant the 8810 had a desirable advantage over its competitors and enjoyed moderate success. The choice to make the antenna internal had a negative effect on battery life, but Nokia felt this was an acceptable trade-off for getting rid of the external antenna.

== Features ==
=== Memory ===
The device's internal memory could store up to 250 names and numbers, up to 10 text messages, and a call history of 30 previous calls (10 dialled, 10 received, and 10 missed). The user could additionally store contacts on an external SIM card as a backup, but there were no options to expand the memory externally.

=== Calls ===
The device had 35 preloaded monophonic ringtones, with additional ringtones available for download at a cost. It could make conference calls, hold calls, and send DTMF tones. Unusual for mobile phones of the era, it did not feature a built-in loudspeaker.

=== Display and input ===
The Nokia 8810 has a five-line monochrome graphic display. Features include dynamic font size and soft key.

=== Connectivity ===
Besides the standard 2G network, the 8810 also features an infrared port which was also adopted into later Nokia devices.

=== Messaging ===
The phone used SMS with T9 predictive text input, and messages could be up to 160 characters long. Compatible phones could send and receive picture messages in Nokia standard Smart Messaging, but not in later (universal) EMS. The phone could receive up to five network operator logos and ringtones. Due to the lack of multimedia support for the phone, the Multimedia Messaging Service was not available. Similarly, email was also not supported.

=== Battery ===
The 8810 had two options for the battery: 600 MAh Ni-Mh as the standard offering that provided 30-60 minutes of calls and 15-60 hours standby, or 400 MAh Lithium-ion for 100-170 minutes of calls and 36-133 hours of standby. The standard battery provided 30 minutes to 1 hour talk time and 15 to 60 hours standby time, and the extended battery provided 1 hour 40 minutes to 2 hours 50 minutes talk time and 36 to 133 hours standby time.

=== Applications ===
The Nokia 8810 had a calculator, a rudimentary currency converter, and a calendar application.
