= Nokia tune =

Default ringtone of Nokia phones

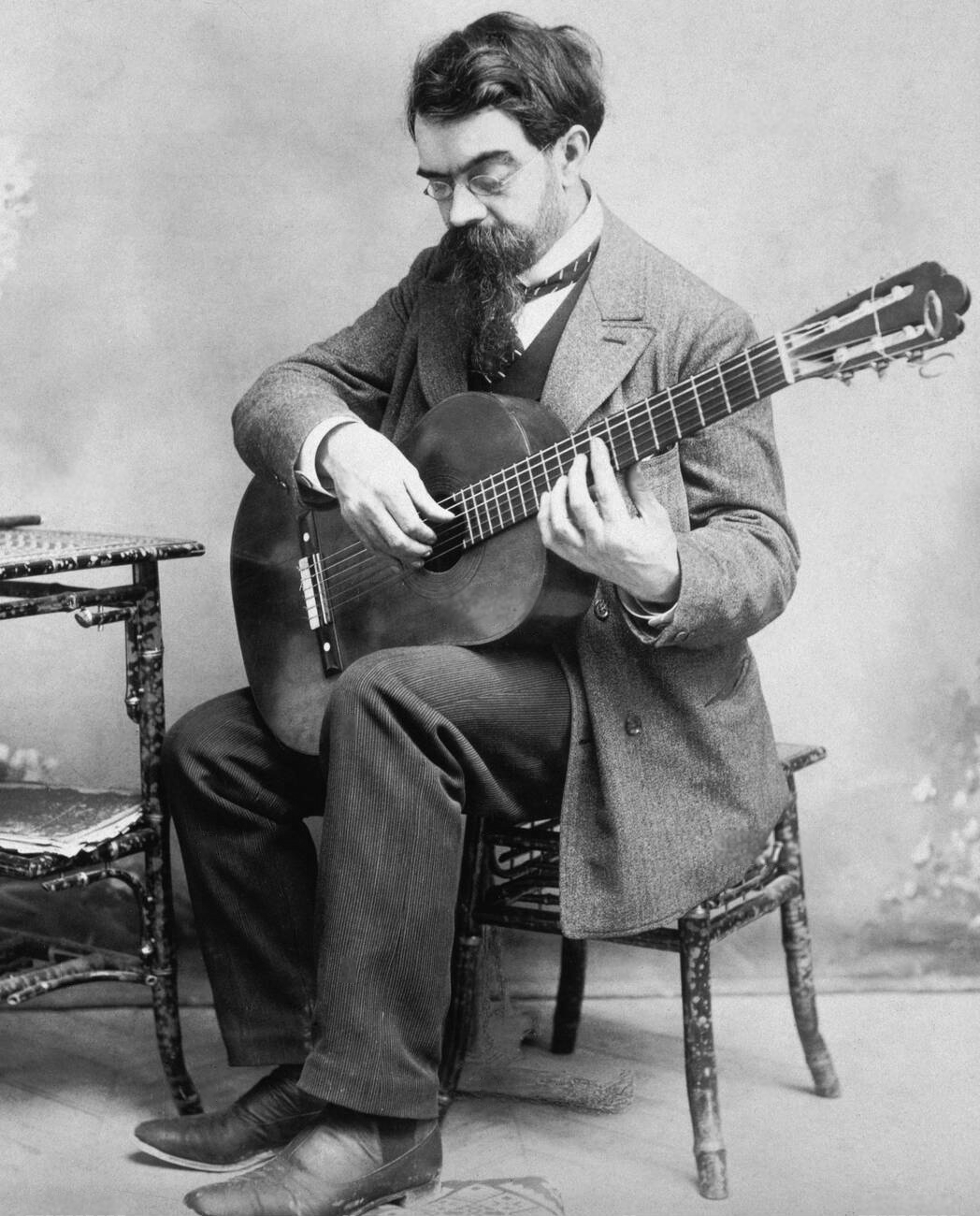
Francisco Tárrega c. 1900

"Nokia tune"; in Tárrega's Gran Vals, the phrase ends on an E instead of an A.

Piano version
Nokia tune on piano

The Nokia tune is a phrase from a composition for solo guitar, Gran Vals, composed in 1902 by the Spanish classical guitarist and composer Francisco Tárrega. It has been associated with Finnish corporation Nokia since the 1990s, becoming the first identifiable musical ringtone on a mobile phone; Nokia selected an excerpt to be used as its default ringtone.

While the ringtone initially shipped as monophonic, this was eventually replaced with polyphonic and audio versions, as a result of evolving mobile technology. It is written in the key of A major.

== History ==
Francisco Tárrega's Gran Vals

In 1992, Nokia used a 1989 rendition of Francisco Tárrega's Gran Vals by Czech guitarist Lubomír Brabec as the background music in a commercial for the Nokia 1011. The excerpt of Gran Vals used includes the phrase that would later be used for the Nokia tune ringtone. In 1993 Anssi Vanjoki, then-executive vice president of Nokia, showed the entirety of Gran Vals to Lauri Kivinen (then-head of corporate communications) and together they selected the excerpt that became "Nokia tune". The excerpt is taken from measures (bars) 13–16 of the piece.

The Nokia tune first appeared on the Nokia 2110 released in 1994, under the name ringtone Type 5, showing that it was just one of the normal ringtones. The tune's original name varied in the ringtone list, listed as Type 13 on some phones, or Type 8 on others. In December 1997 with the introduction of the Nokia 6110, ringtones were each given a specific name, and the tune received the name "Grande valse". Some later Nokia phones (e.g. some 3310s) still used Type 7 as the name of the Nokia tune. In 1998, "Grande valse" was renamed to "Nokia tune" and effectively became Nokia's flagship ringtone.

=== Later versions ===
The Nokia tune has been updated several times, either to take advantage of advancing technology or to reflect musical trends at the time. The first polyphonic MIDI version of the Nokia tune, created by composer Ian Livingstone (often mistaken as being Thomas Dolby's work), was introduced in 2001 with the release of two South Korea-exclusive devices, the Nokia 8877 and the Nokia 8887. The Nokia 3510, released in 2002, was the first globally released phone to include this version, using Beatnik's miniBAE technology. The Nokia 9500 Communicator in 2004 introduced a realtone recorded piano version. A guitar-based version was introduced with the Nokia N78 in 2008, reflecting the popularity of nu-folk at the time.

The Nokia N9 in late 2011 introduced a new version, which was created by in-house composer Henry Daw. This version uses a marimba for its melody, and was intended to be genre-neutral. The same year, a contest titled Nokia Tune Remake was held on the crowdsourcing website Audiodraft. The winning entry was a dubstep "Nokia tune remix" version, which was shipped on many Nokia phones from 2011 to 2013 alongside the regular Nokia tune. Another updated version of the Nokia tune was introduced in 2012 with Lumia 920, built on the same principles as the 2011 version. In 2018, a new version was introduced on HMD Global's Nokia 1 and Nokia 7 Plus, and remained in use until HMD's license of the Nokia brand ended. This was also created by Henry Daw; it was intended to be an evolution of the 2013 version while retaining similar instrumentation.

Other versions have been produced for specific models. These include a slow piano version for the Nokia 8800 by Ryuichi Sakamoto, and a slow guitar version for the Nokia 8800 Sirocco Edition by Brian Eno.

== Legacy ==
In December 1999, Jimmy Cauty, formerly of The KLF, and Guy Pratt released the mobile telephone-themed novelty-pop record "I Wanna 1-2-1 With You" under the name Solid Gold Chartbusters which heavily samples the theme. It was released as competition for the UK Christmas number one single but only got to number 62. The release of this song prevented the Super Furry Animals from releasing their song "Wherever I Lay My Phone (That's My Home)" from the album Guerrilla as a single, on the grounds that it was also based on a mobile phone theme.

The tune was prominently featured in a recurring sketch on the British hidden camera/practical joke reality television series Trigger Happy TV.

In 2009, it was reported that the tune was heard worldwide an estimated 1.8 billion times per day, about 20,000 times per second.

The tune has been registered by Nokia as a sound trademark in some countries.

Dutch cabaret duo Van der Laan & Woe had a 2017 comedy show Pesetas, revolving around Francisco Tárrega and how an excerpt of his Gran Vals became known as the Nokia Tune.

== Use in popular music ==
Canadian pianist Marc-André Hamelin wrote a short composition entitled Valse Irritation d'après Nokia based on the tune.

The Indonesian rock band The Changcuters included the segment of the Nokia tune on their song "Parampampam". The song was included on their 2011 album Tugas Akhir and was also featured on the Nokia X2-01 for the Indonesian market.

The American rock band Green Day included the Nokia tune in the demo of their song "Homecoming (Nobody Likes You)". The song was included on the 20th anniversary edition of the American Idiot album.

Canadian rapper Drake sampled the ringtone on his 2025 track "Nokia", on $ome $exy $ongs 4 U; his collaborative album with fellow Canadian singer PartyNextDoor.
