= Nokia 3210 =

1999 cell phone model

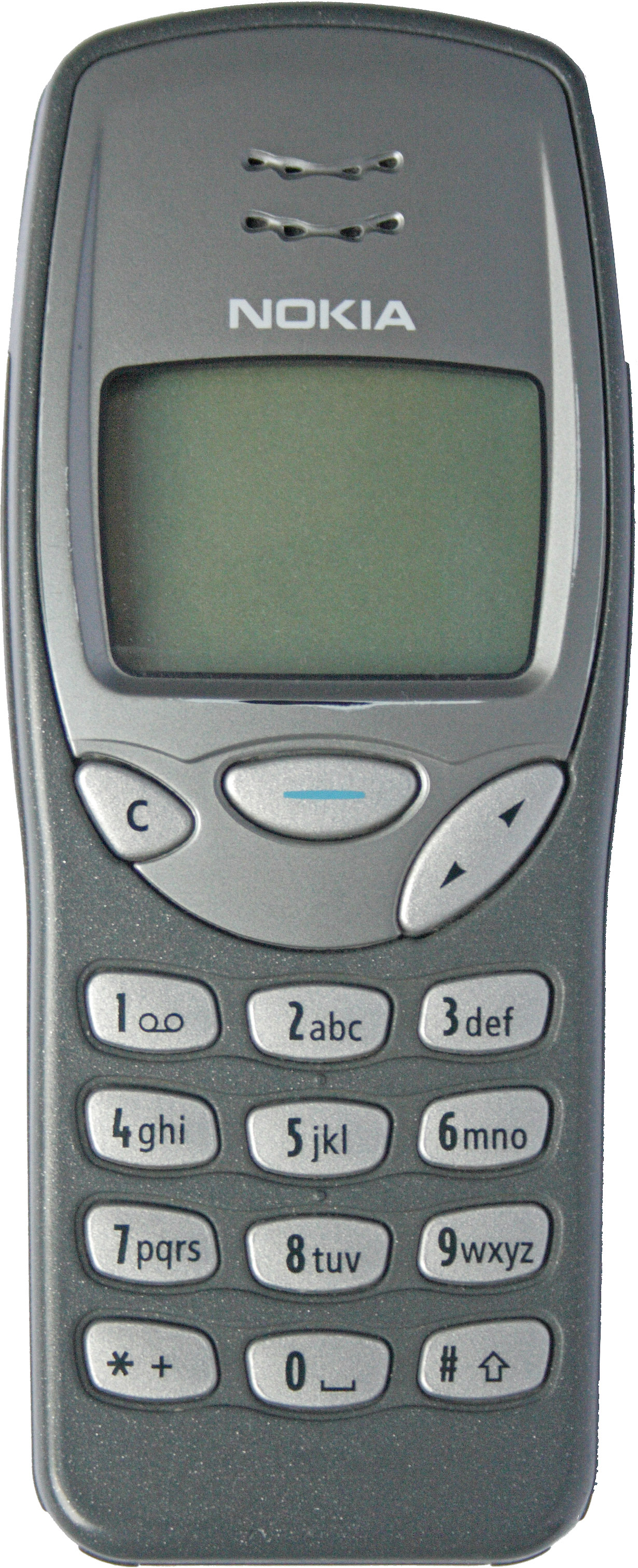
- Manufacturer: Nokia
- Series: Nokia 3000 series
- First released: Q2 1999
- Discontinued: 2001
- Units sold: 160 million
- Predecessor: Nokia 3110, Nokia 5110
- Successor: Nokia 3310, Nokia 5510, Nokia 210 (2019), Nokia 3210 (2024)
- Related: List of Nokia products
- Compatible networks: GSM 900 / 1800
- Form factor: Candy bar
- Dimensions: 123.8 mm × 50.5 mm × 22.5 mm (4.87 in × 1.99 in × 0.89 in)
- Weight: 151 g (5.3 oz)
- Operating system: Series 20 UI
- CPU: Texas Instruments MAD2PR1
- Memory: SIM card only – up to 250 names in phonebook
- Battery: Removable BML-3 (NiMH) 1250 mAh
- Display: 1.5-inch backlit monochrome graphic LCD (84×48 px, 64 ppi, 5 lines)
- Sound: Monophonic ringtones
- Data inputs: Alphanumeric keypad

The Nokia 3210 is a GSM cell phone, announced by Nokia at the CeBIT fair on March 18, 1999, alongside the Nokia 7110. Succeeding the Nokia 5110, the 3210 handset was competitively priced and targeted specifically at teenagers and young professionals, adding a number of capabilities such as T9 predictive text. It was notably the first consumer-grade mobile phone without a protruding external antenna.

== History ==
The 3210 was designed by Alastair Curtis at Nokia's Los Angeles Design Center. The development was led by Frank Nuovo, who had designed the sleek and curvy Nokia 8110 in 1996. The team aimed to create an "expressive" and customizable handset that went beyond the typical business-oriented mobile phone market, drawing inspiration from the Casio G-Shock and Sony Walkman designs. As a result, the phone became highly influential.

== Design ==
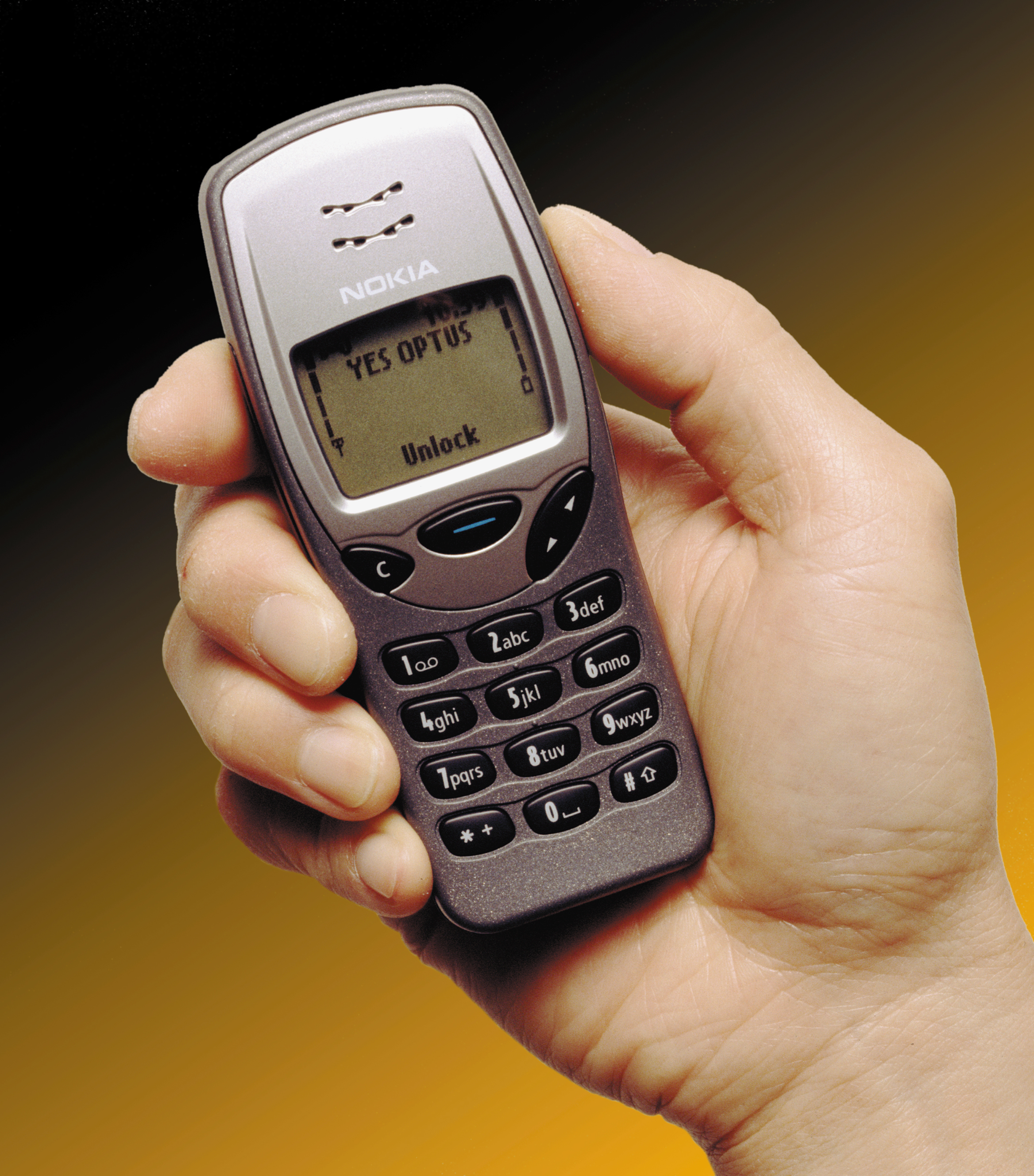
A Nokia 3210 with a black keypad

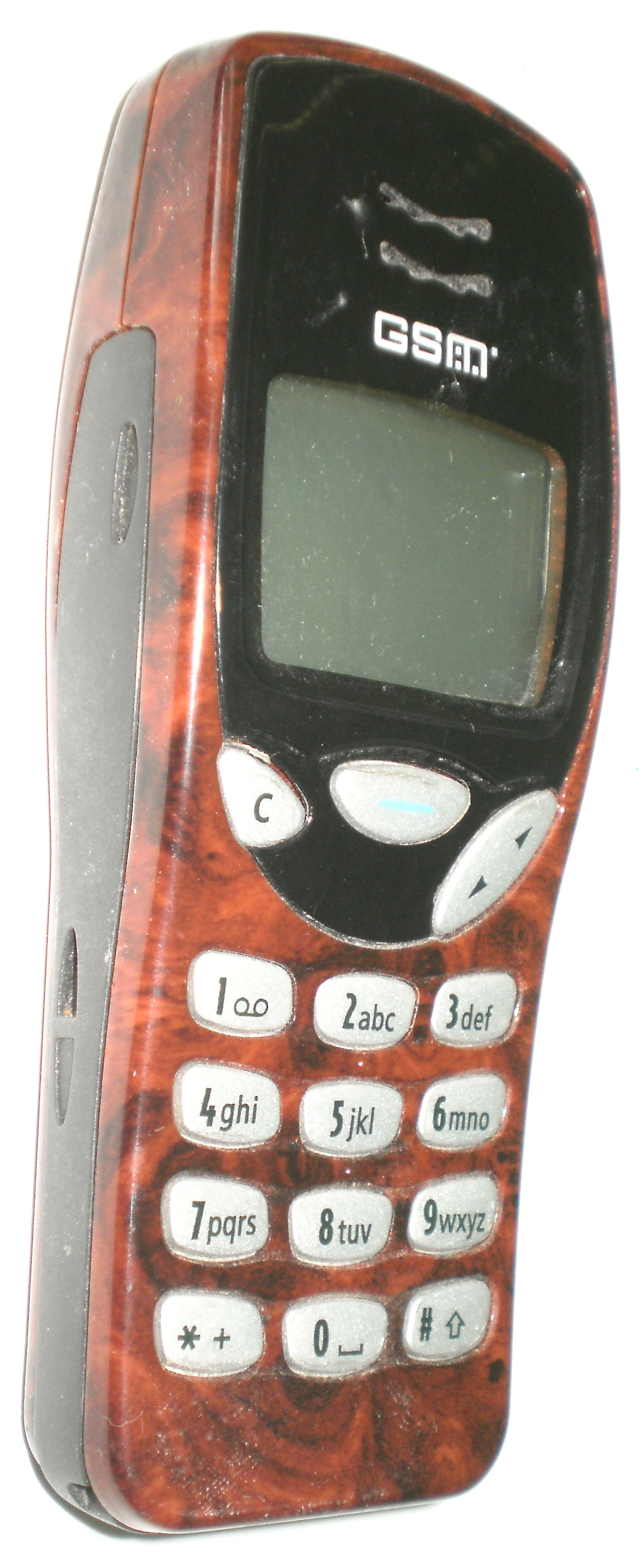
Nokia 3210 fitted with an aftermarket fascia

The Nokia 3210 has a total weight of 151 g and features customizable fascias that clip on. It was thinner than previous Nokia models.

It was the first mass market phone with an internal antenna, a feature that had been introduced by Nokia on the luxury phone Nokia 8810 in 1998.

== Features ==
Three games came builtin: Snake, Memory (pairs-memory game), and Rotation. The inclusion of these games contributed to high sales within a rapidly expanding youth market. Some versions of the 3210 included the "hidden" games React and Logic, which could be activated by special software using a data cable.

The 3210 was the first device to come with Nokia's Composer feature , allowing users to manually "compose" monotone ringtones. It was also possible to send ringtones to another Nokia phone.

The device came with the ability to send monotone images that were builtin to the phone to other Nokia phones with support of the same feature. An example would be the "happy birthday" image.

The 3210 was originally designed with a vibrate alert function. However, Nokia decided not to implement this feature on some handsets in certain jurisdictions. A few months after its UK release, some mobile phone repair shops offered customers an upgrade to the vibrate function for a small fee.

== Handset specifications ==
- Standby time (h): 55–260
- Talk time (min): 180–270
- Charge time (h): 4
- Ringtone composer
- Dual band: Yes
- Vibrating alert (optional)
- Speed dialing
- 3 games: Yes
- Internal antenna
- Green backlight
- Interchangeable fascias

== Reception ==
A combination of cutting-edge features, such as internal antennas and T9 text entry, ensured the 3210's huge commercial success. Much of the phone's success can also be attributed to an advertising campaign aimed predominantly at young people, a first in the mobile phone industry. The inclusion of three games, changeable "Xpress-on" covers (as seen on the previous Nokia 5110), an internal antenna, customizable ringtones, and competitive prices contributed to the handset's massive popularity among those aged 15–25.

With 160 million units sold, the 3210 is one of the most successful phones in history. It is considered one of the most significant handsets Nokia ever developed.

== Revival ==
In 2024, HMD Global released a new phone inspired by the Nokia 3210 as part of the Nokia Originals line.

== See also ==
- Nokia 3110
- Nokia 3310
