= Snake II =

- Developer: Nokia
- Series: Snake
- Platforms: Series 20; Series 30; J2ME (color version)
- Release: 1998 (Nokia 7110)
- Genre: Snake
- Modes: Single-player, multiplayer

Snake II is a mobile game released in 1998 for Nokia 7110. The game is a sequel of the 1998 Snake, for Nokia 6110.

== Gameplay ==
Snake II gameplay is similar to Snake. The player controls a snake through the numbers of the cellphone. The goal is to collect as many orbs as possible. Every time the snake eats an orb, it increases its length. If the snake collides with itself or with the scenery, the game is over.

Differently from its predecessor, the main level doesn't end if the player collides with the boundaries of the map. Instead, the snake will appear on the other side of the screen. It is also possible to eat more orbs beyond the existing snake length. The game also features five different mazes, improved graphics and higher speed. It was possible to play with two players using infrared connection.

== Release ==
Snake II was officially released in 1998 for Nokia 7110. In 2000, the game was re-released for Nokia 3310. In 2002, a enhanced color version of Snake II was released for some Nokia's J2ME devices.

In December 2020, Retro Widget released Snake II for iPhone and iPad home screen and Apple Watch. The game is also available for Android.

== Popularity ==
With the release of Snake II, Nokia reached about 350 million gamers. Nokia 3310 sold about 126 million units with the game installed, while Nokia 1100 sold about over 250 million units with the game installed.
