= Nokia 5110 =

Mobile phone model

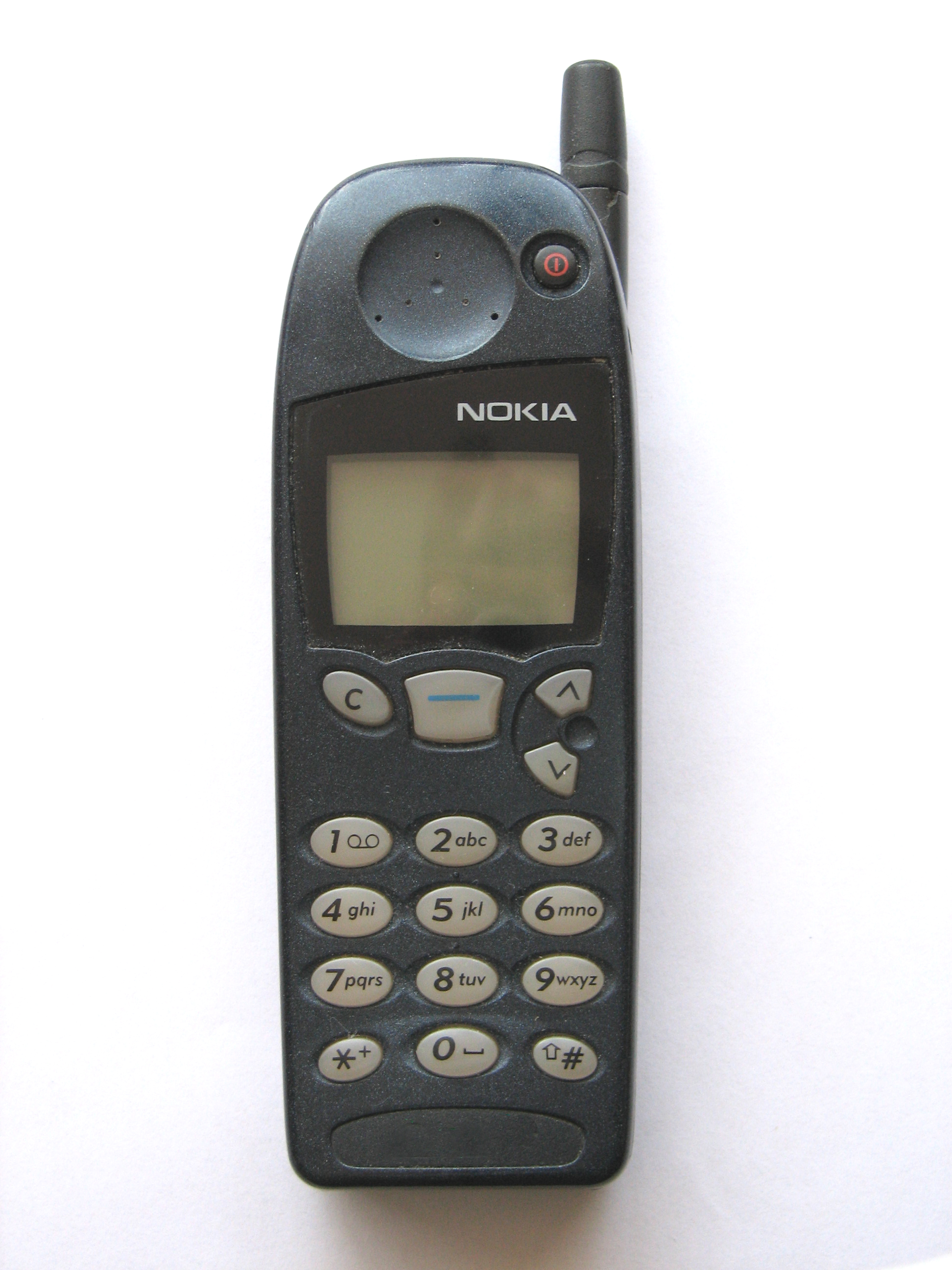
- Manufacturer: Nokia
- Availability by region: 1998
- Predecessor: Nokia 232; Nokia 252; Nokia 3110; Nokia 2170 (5170); Nokia 2180 (5180/5185)
- Successor: Nokia 3210 (5110); Nokia 3315 (5110i); Nokia 3320 (5120); Nokia 3321 (5125); Nokia 3330 (5130); Nokia 3360 (5160); Nokia 3361 (5165); Nokia 3350 (5170); Nokia 3280 (5180); Nokia 3285 (5185); Nokia 3390 (5190)
- Related: Nokia 6110
- Compatible networks: GSM
- Form factor: Bar
- Dimensions: 48×132×31 mm (1.9×5.2×1.2 in)
- Battery: 900 mAh NiMH
- Display: 84 x 48 B/W

The Nokia 5110 is a GSM mobile phone that was introduced by Nokia on 12 April 1998. The 5110 was intended for the consumer market, succeeding the Nokia 3110 (1997) and the analogue Nokia 232 (1994), and it based on the same platform (DCT3) as the business-oriented Nokia 6110, giving it additional features such as games and alarm clock. The Nokia 5110 was discontinued by the year 2000, having been fully replaced by the smaller Nokia 3210.

The 5110 is also known as the Nokia 5146 on One2One or the nk402 on Orange in the UK.

== Features ==
The Nokia 5110 features an 84×48-pixel monochrome LCD with four LED backlights, operated by the Philips PCD8544 display controller. Its design is based on the same platform as Nokia 6110 for the business market. It features a similar, simpler, revamped user interface called Series 20, but lacked the infrared data interface. It can, however, be interfaced with a computer via a cellular data card and a proprietary cable, enabling it to function like a modem to connect to remote computer systems through the Public switched telephone network (PSTN).

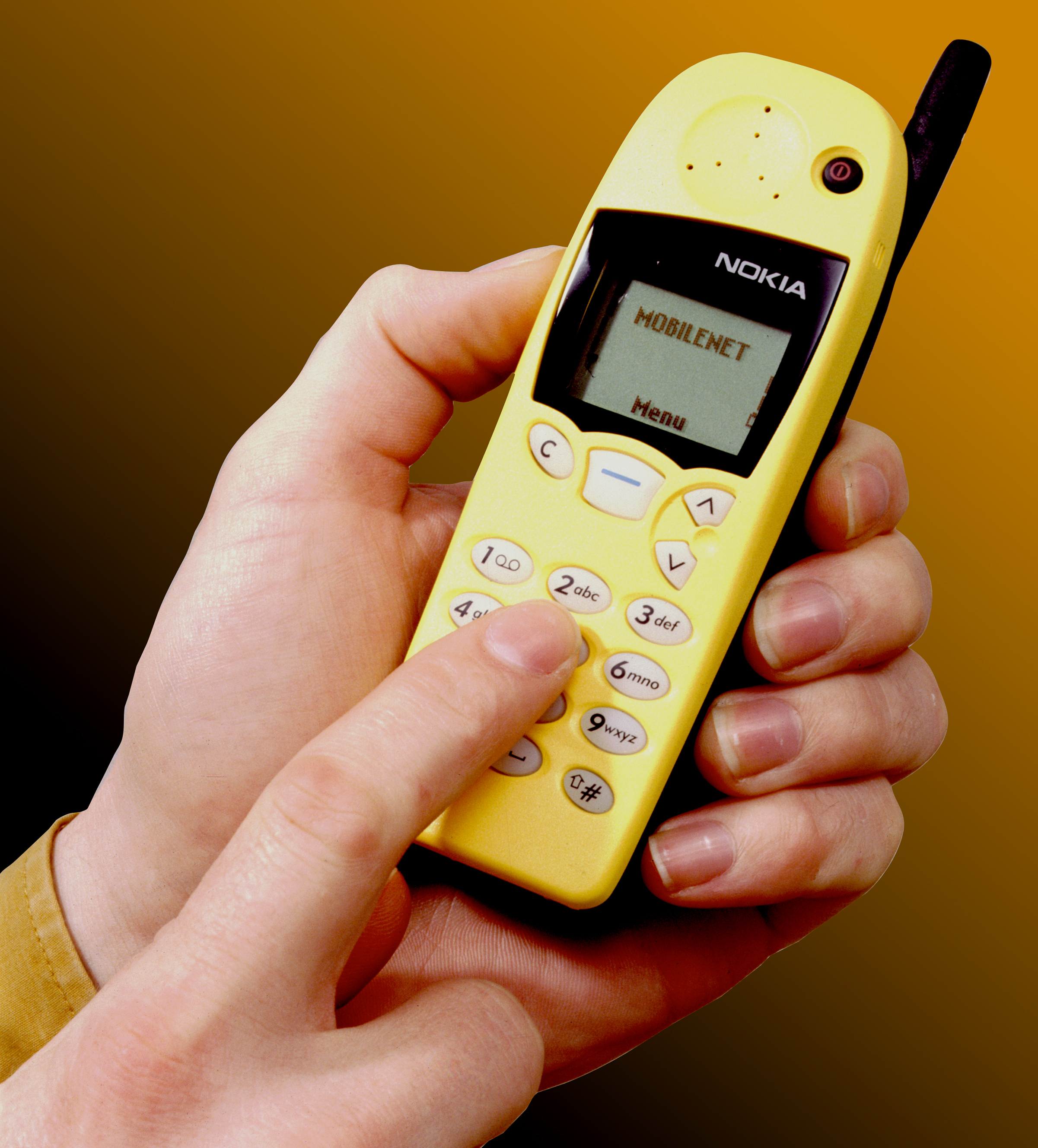
A yellow Nokia 5110

It is the first Nokia phone to come with replaceable faceplates, which Nokia branded "Xpress-on" covers; a concept Nokia incorporated into several other consumer-oriented cellphones aimed at the young adult market for years to come, allowing users to customize their device. "Xpress-on" was trademarked in the U.S. on 25 February 1998.

The Nokia 5110 is also one of the first mobile phones to feature the game Snake. It became one of the most popular phones of its era.

The Nokia model 5110 received some notoriety following the triple October 2002 Bali bombings that resulted in 202 deaths. A shard from the phone—which was used as the detonation device—was recovered outside the US consulate in Denpasar. The fragment included the phone's IMEI number and authorities were able to trace the phone's owner. With this information police & intelligence could then unravel the entire Jemaah Islamiyah terror cell's network.

== Variants ==
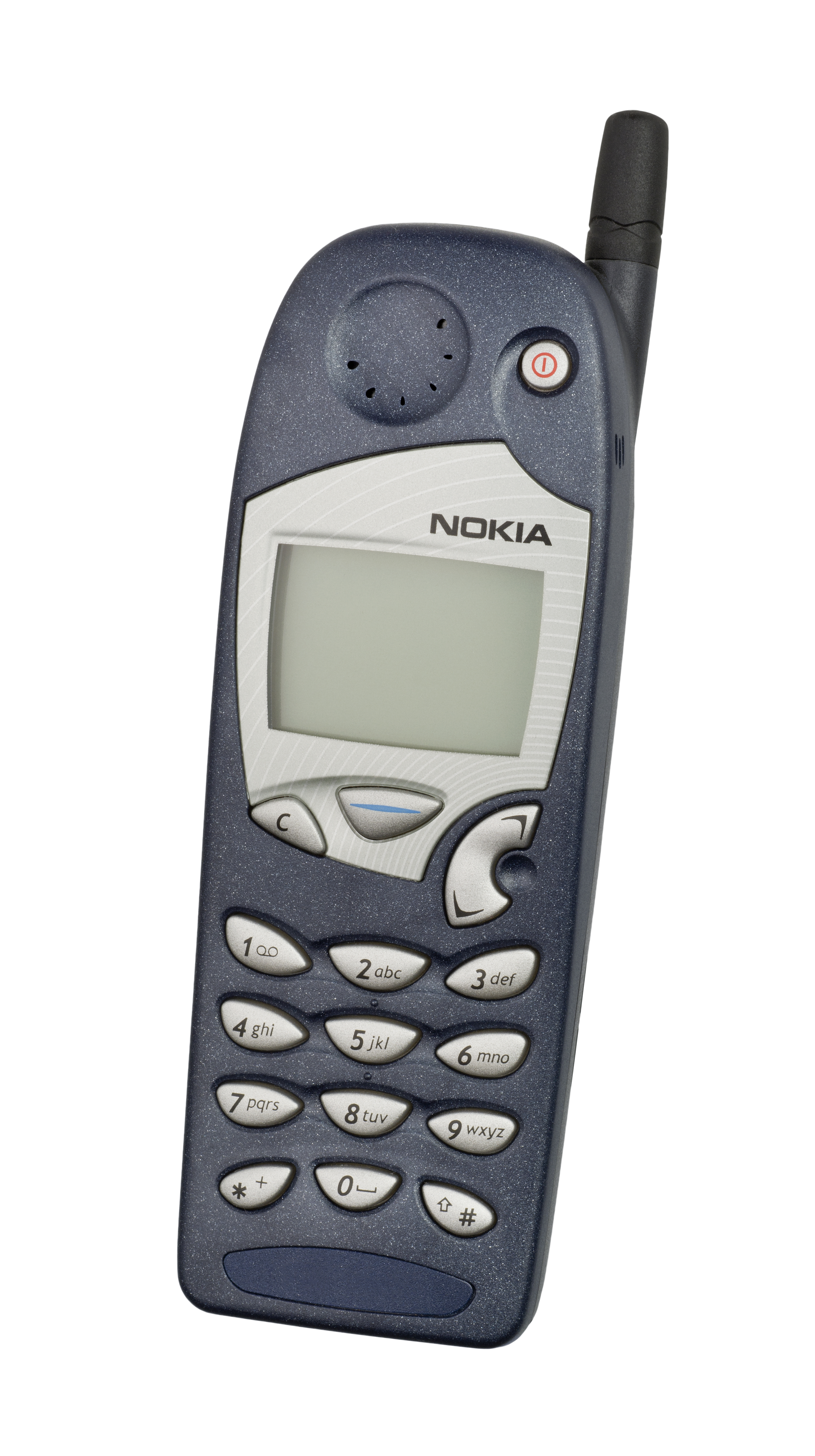
Nokia 5125 variant (USA)

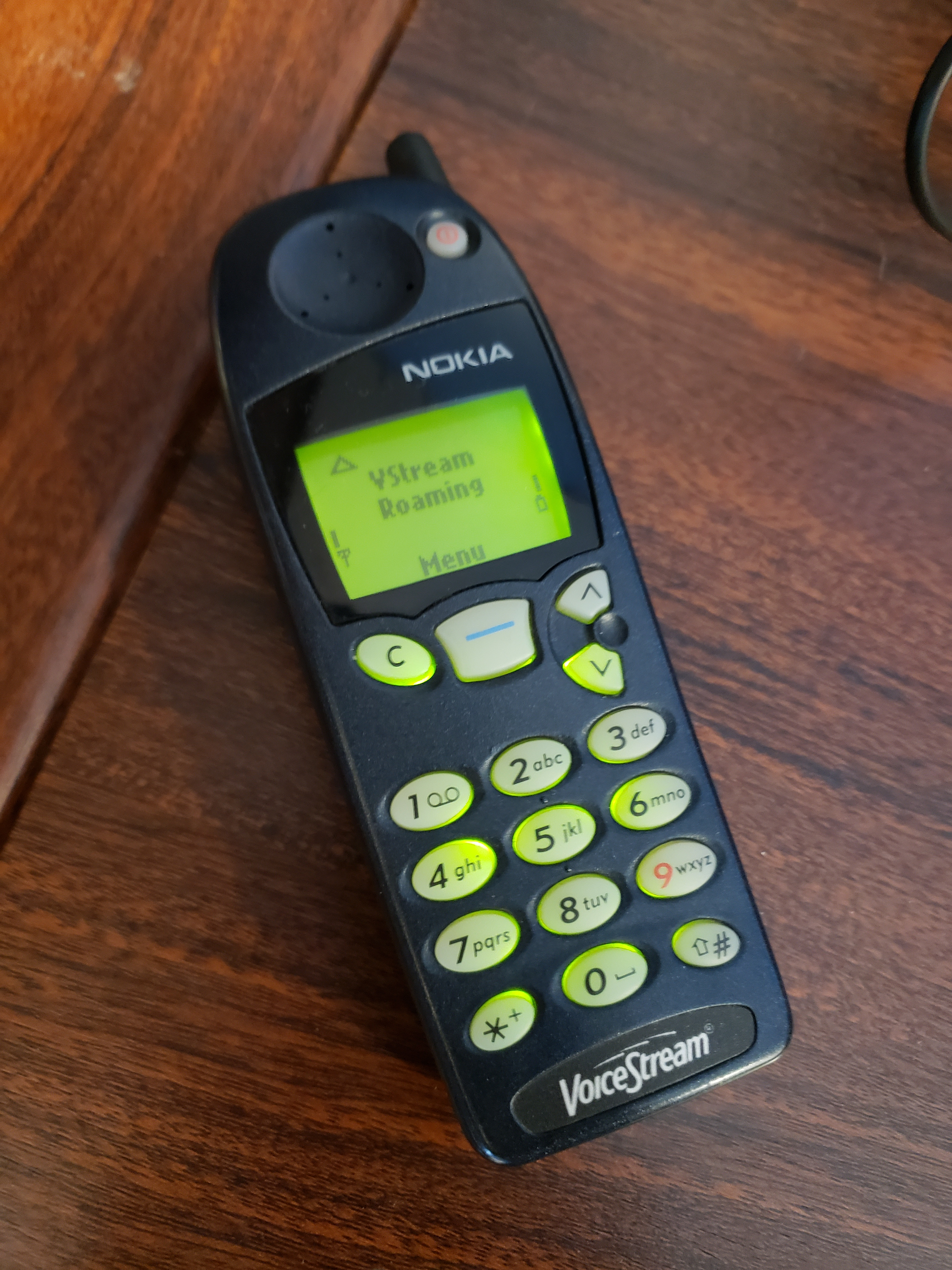
Nokia 5190 variant (USA)

In the Asia Pacific region, Nokia launched a successor to the 5110, the 5110i. The 5110i has longer talk and standby times, and had a more ergonomic, redesigned, silicone keypad.

While the Nokia 5110 operates only on 900MHz GSM networks, the 5130 operates on 1800MHz GSM networks instead. It was marketed by Orange UK as the nk402.

The North American variant of this handset is Nokia 5190, which is a 1900 MHz-only GSM handset. Nokia 5125 is the North American version of the 5110i.

Nokia 5160/Nokia 5165 with TDMA/IS-136 service on 800 MHz and 1900 MHz and analog AMPS service at 800 MHz is the same handset form. Nokia 5120/5125 is a TDMA/IS-136 handset that operates on 800 MHz, and also on AMPS at 800 MHz.

Nokia 5180i/Nokia 5185i are CDMA/AMPS handsets.

In Brazil, Gradiente manufactured a variant of the Nokia 5120 under license as the Gradiente Strike.

== See also ==
- List of Nokia products
