= Nokia 8850/8890 =

Mobile phone model

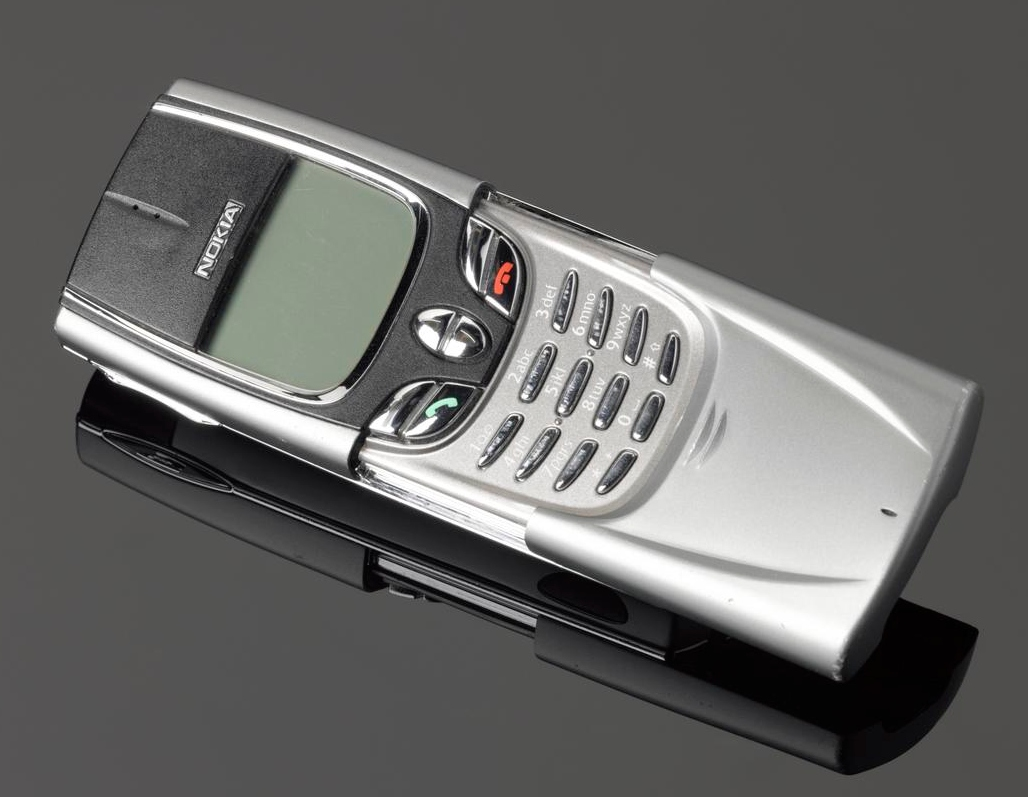
- Manufacturer: Nokia
- Availability by region: 1999
- Predecessor: Nokia 8810 (8850/8890); Nokia 8860 (8855)
- Successor: Nokia 8910 (8850/8890); Nokia 8910i (8855)
- Related: List of Nokia products
- Compatible networks: GSM 900/1800 (8850/8855); GSM 900/1900 (8890)
- Form factor: Slider
- Dimensions: 100 mm × 44 mm × 17 mm (3.94 in × 1.73 in × 0.67 in)
- Weight: 91 g (3.2 oz)
- Operating system: Series 20
- Memory: 250 names and numbers, 10 SMS.
- Removable storage: No
- Battery: 830 mAh lithium-ion
- Display: 84x48 Monochrome LCD
- Connectivity: Infrared port

The Nokia 8850 is a mobile phone handset manufactured by Nokia. It was a light alloy-bodied enhanced version of Nokia 8210 model with slider protection of the keypad and white lighting of the keypad and screen. The 8850 is considered to be an un-repairable phone, thus resulting in very few active handsets in the market. Today it remains a collector's item. It also came in gold. It was introduced as a successor of an earlier model, the Nokia 8810.

It was succeeded by the Nokia 8910, which was released in 2002.

== Memory ==
The phone's memory can store up to 250 names and 50 calendar notes. SMS messages can only be stored on the SIM card.

== Call management ==
The phone has a speed dial feature in which the user can assign a name to 8 of the keys of the keypad. Voice dialing can also be used by assigning up to 8 voice tags to names. Dialed, received and missed calls are all logged. Contacts can be added to one of five groups that can have different logos and ringtones.

== Messaging ==
The phone uses SMS (Short Message Service) with T9 predictive text input, with support for major European languages. Asian version firmware features PinYin text input which enables Chinese words to be typed and sent.

Messages can be up to 160 characters long. Compatible phones can send and receive picture messaging in Nokia standard Smart Messaging, not in later (universal) EMS. It could receive network operator logos and ringtones (up to five).

== Wireless transfer ==
The phone features an infrared port on the lower left side which can be used to communicate with a compatible PC. As well as this, the infrared port can also be used to transfer names and phone numbers between compatible phones an addition to business card sending and receiving. Data is transferred at 9.6 kilobits per second (CSD).

== Other specifications ==
The phone weighs 91 g (with a lithium battery) and had dimension of 100x44x17 mm. It has a white light blue tinted frontlit monochrome display (the keypad is also illuminated white) 96x64 pixels. The volume has 10 levels and is controlled via chrome button on the top left side of the phone. The base of the phone contains the charger and headset connector. The Nokia 8850 uses GSM 900/1800 and supports Extended GSM 900 band (EGSM) and can automatically switch between bands. The North American version, the Nokia 8890, had all the same features but a retractable antenna and GSM 900 and 1900 MHz bands. The phone has four games: Memory, Snake, Logic and Rotation.
