= Nimble Quest =

2013 video game

- Developer: NimbleBit
- Publisher: NimbleBit (iOS)
- Platforms: iOS, Android, Ouya, Steam
- Release: March 28, 2013 (iOS, Android); December 6, 2013 (Steam)
- Genre: Action role-playing game
- Mode: Single player

Nimble Quest is an action RPG video game which was originally released by NimbleBit on March 28, 2013. Originally a free-to-play game for iOS and Android, a Steam version was released on December 6, 2013 as a paid version. The game is a combination of an action RPG and the classic Snake concept. The player moves around and kills enemies using a combination of ranged attacks or melee attacks depending on the character. Once enough enemies are killed, the player advances to the next level. If the player hits a wall or an enemy, or runs out of health, the game ends.

The original version of the game no longer functions on the iPad after upgrading to iOS 11. In September 2024 new iOS and Android versions were released by Halfbrick Studios.

== Characters ==
The game has 16 main characters called "heroes" to play as. The player unlocks these heroes by beating a level. Heroes can be added to the "snake" when they are randomly dropped from an enemy the player killed. The player starts out with 3 characters.

== Reception ==
The game has received mostly positive reviews. It is rated 4.5 stars out of 5 on the App Store, where it received Editor's Choice upon its release. Gamezebo's 4.5 star review described it as "seriously potent fun."

On 2025, Tidepool Games released MageTrain, a snake game inspired by Nimble Quest.
