= Snake Rewind =

2015 video game

- Logo for Snake Rewind
- Developer: Rumilus Design
- Publisher: Rumilus Design
- Programmer: Taneli Armanto
- Platforms: iOS, Android, Windows Phone
- Release: 14 May 2015
- Genre: Snake
- Mode: Single player

Snake Rewind is a freemium mobile arcade video game developed and published by Rumilus Design and was released in May 2015 for iOS, Android and Windows Phone. Taneli Armanto, the developer behind the Snake game included by default in many Nokia phones that were produced 1997 and 1998, partnered with Rumilus Design to create this app. The game received positive and mixed reception from critics because of the glitchy control scheme.

== Gameplay ==
In Snake Rewind the player controls a snake-like dot or line and must try to collect the fruits that spawn around the playing field while trying to stay inside the boarded plane and not accidentally running into the snake itself. As the player moves forwards, the snake will leave a trail of where it has been thus the player must choose carefully where they want to go. The main area where Snake Rewind differs from the original Snake game is ability to rewind time when the snake dies. The rewind ability is used by spending fruit, the games currency. The game features power ups and 10 different areas to play in.

== Development ==
Taneli Armanto, the creator of the first snake game released onto Nokia phones in 1997 and 1998 paired with Rumilus Design in order to create the game. Armanto said in a press release that the game took the "iconic elements and intuitive gameplay from the original snake game" and combined it with special effects, sounds and "innovative new features" Although the price was never revealed until the day of release, people speculated using the information they had been given that it would be a free-to-play mobile game with microtransactions. When the game was released it proved these speculations right. The microtransactions were through the in-game shop called the "Fruit Store".

== Reception ==
Snake Rewind received mixed acclaim from critics because of the "broken" control scheme. Jennifer Allen, a 148Apps writer criticized the control scheme saying "there's a choice of swipes or taps but neither entirely succeeds" and can sometime result in failures that weren't entirely the players fault. The game was also called "nostalgic" by reviewers because it kept the original gameplay mechanics. WMPoweruser writer, Jay Asimhabr gave the game an 8/10 because of the poor controls but said the game was nostalgic in its own right. Jordan Devore, a writer at Destructoid said the original snake game did not need a modern-day sequel.
