= Nokia 6150 =

Cell phone model

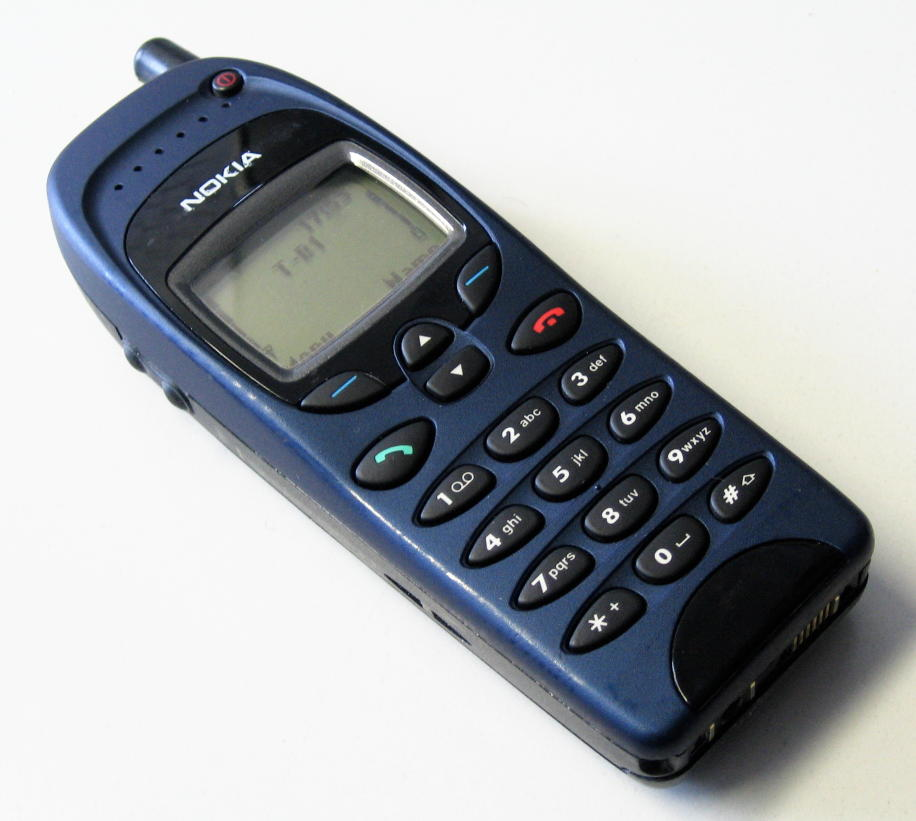
- Manufacturer: Nokia
- Series: 61xx
- Availability by region: 1998
- Predecessor: Nokia 6110
- Successor: Nokia 6210
- Compatible networks: GSM 900/1800 (Europe), GSM 1900 (US)
- Form factor: Feature phone
- Weight: 141 g (5 oz)
- Removable storage: No
- Battery: Extended NiMH Battery 900 mAh
- Rear camera: No
- Front camera: No
- Display: 80*40 dot matrix LCD, 5 lines capable
- Connectivity: Internal GSM switched mode modem

The Nokia 6150 was a mobile phone released in 1998. It was an enhanced version of the Nokia 6110 - 6130: it could support both 900 MHz and 1800-1900 MHz GSM bands. The extra hardware required for dual-band capability (something uncommon for the era as transceivers were single-band initially) made the top side thicker than the 6110. The phone was used in the Mercedes-Benz S-Class (W220) (1998-2006 model), where it was held in a cradle and connected to the car's integrated car phone and media system called COMAND.
