= Snakes Subsonic =

2007 video game

- Developer(s): Barking Lizards Technologies
- Publisher(s): Nokia
- Series: Snake
- Release: 2007 (N-Gage 2.0)
- Genre(s): Snake; puzzle
- Mode(s): Single-player; multiplayer

Snakes Subsonic is a game release in 2007 for N-Gage 2.0. The game is a sequel to Snakes and the last game in the Snake series to be produced.

== Gameplay ==
It is possible collect green pallets to get bigger, and if the player collides with his own tail, he dies. But, differently from Snake, colliding with the scenario doesn't result in game over. Instead, the life bar will go down. There are 40 levels themed with the four elements and 20 levels from N-Gage Arena. There are also secret levels that are unlocked by collecting the letters from "SNAKES". To advance a level, it is necessary to empty blue "evolver bar" by following the trail of glowing blue pellets, that appear after eating a certain number of green pallets. The soundtrack accelerates as the snake eat the pellets, and if one is missed, they are resetted. The player also has to solve several puzzles to advance in the game. The snake can run in a 3D ambient. It is also possible to collect power-ups, including shields and missiles, that are to be used in enemy snakes and other obstacles. Also, red squares in the floor slows the snake down, while blue squares have the opposite effect.

There is a multiplayer mode, where up to four players compete to get a set number of points. It is possible to post high scores in the platform.

== Development and release ==
The game was developed by Barking Lizards. Hannu Korhonen has worked on the playability of the game. The soundtrack was composed by DJ Champion.

Snakes Subsonic was released in 2007 for N-Gage 2.0. In June 2008, Nokia released the game for Symbian cellphones.

== Reception ==
Pocket Gamer gave a score of three from five stars, citing that "ultimately, though, Snakes Subsonic is fine. It's fine. But it's not as good as Snakes, or arguably even Snake".
