= Nokia 8910 =

2002 cell phone model

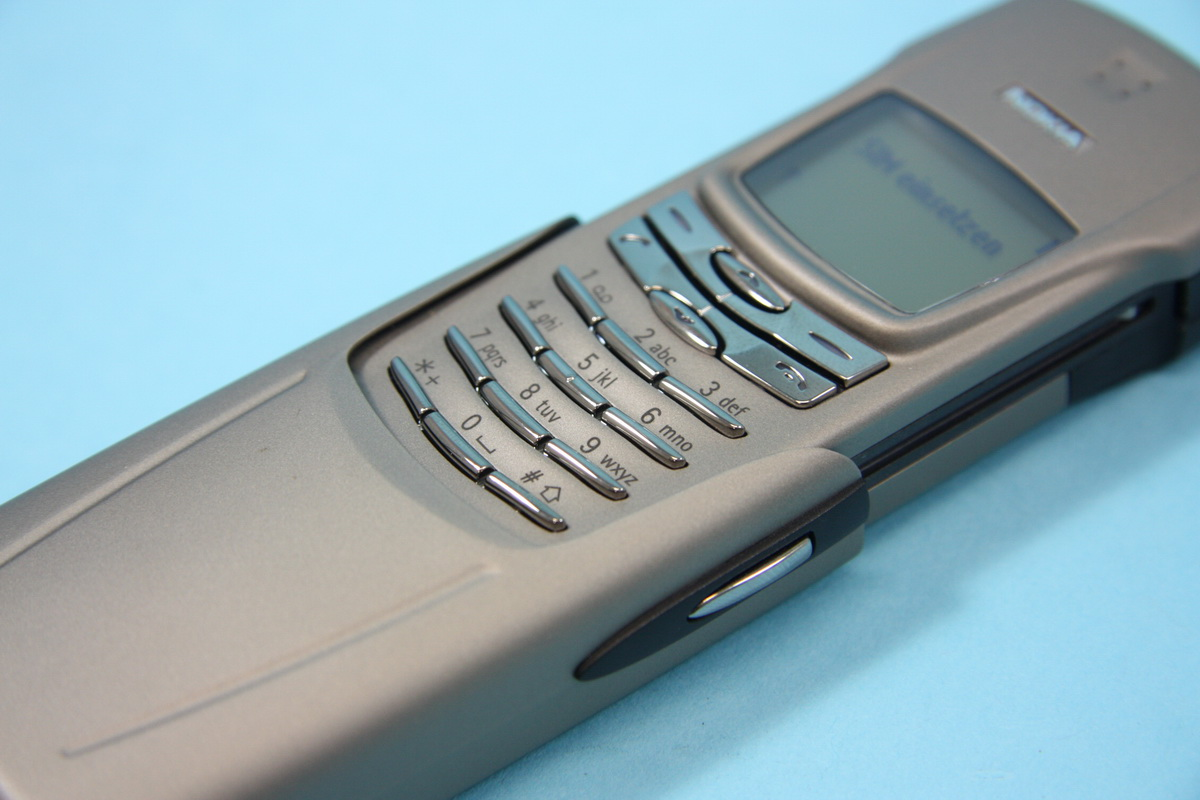
Nokia 8910 with titanium casing

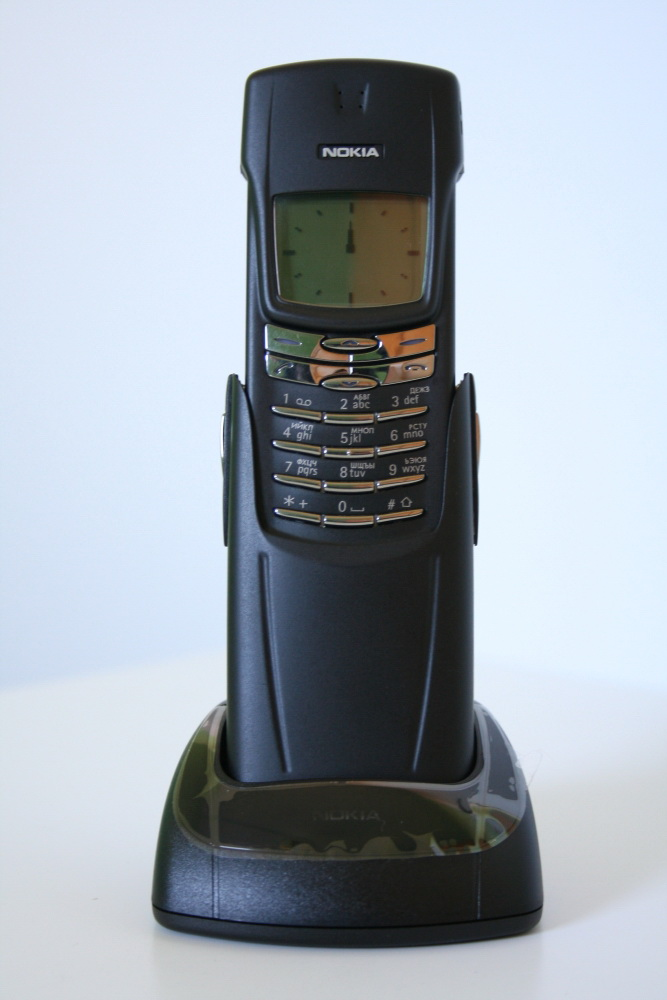
A Nokia 8910 on a desktop stand (DCV-4)

The Nokia 8910 is a mobile phone released in 2002 by Nokia, with a starting price of 1500$. Part of the luxury 8xxx series, it was introduced as a successor of the Nokia 8850/8890. It has a monochrome display in a 84x48 pixels of resolution and a white backlight, based in 8310, and features Bluetooth connectivity.

It was succeeded by the Nokia 8910i, which was released in 2003.

The monochrome model was discontinued in early 2005, while the color model, 8910i, was continued to be produced until 2007.

== Features ==
Premium Build The phone's protective casing is made from titanium, making it lightweight yet highly durable and scratch-resistant.

Sliding Mechanism It features a signature design where the phone rises from the handgrip cover when side buttons are pressed.Display: The original 8910 (pictured) has a monochrome graphic display with a resolution of 96 x 65 pixels and a bright white backlight.

Connectivity It was one of the early phones to include Bluetooth connectivity (for headsets and PC syncing) and also featured an infrared port.Battery: It uses a removable Li-Ion 830 mAh battery (BLB-2), offering a standby time of roughly 100 to 300 hours and talk time between 2 and 4 hours.

== See also ==
- Vertu
