= MageTrain =

2025 video game

- Developer: Tidepool Games
- Publisher: Tidepool Games
- Programmer: Benjamin Dressler
- Platforms: Android iOS
- Release: 8 April 2025
- Genres: roguelike, snake
- Mode: Single player

MageTrain is a roguelike snake game developed by Tidepool Games.

== Gameplay ==
The player must navigate a line of warriors through an arena and avoid obstacles and other dangers. There are 26 types of enemies to be defeated. There are nine heroes that attack automatically. There are also special abilities based on the position of the heroes in the line. There are also 30 skills that can be upgraded with gold and powerups that can be collected. There are a total of eight dungeons.

== Development and release ==
MageTrain was developed by Benjamin Dressler from Vancouver-based studio Tidepool Games and released for Android and iOS on 8 April 2025. The game uses a pixelated art style. It is inspired on Nimble Quest and its structure is similar to Slay the Spire and FTL: Faster Than Light.
