= Tree Men Games =

Finnish mobile game developer

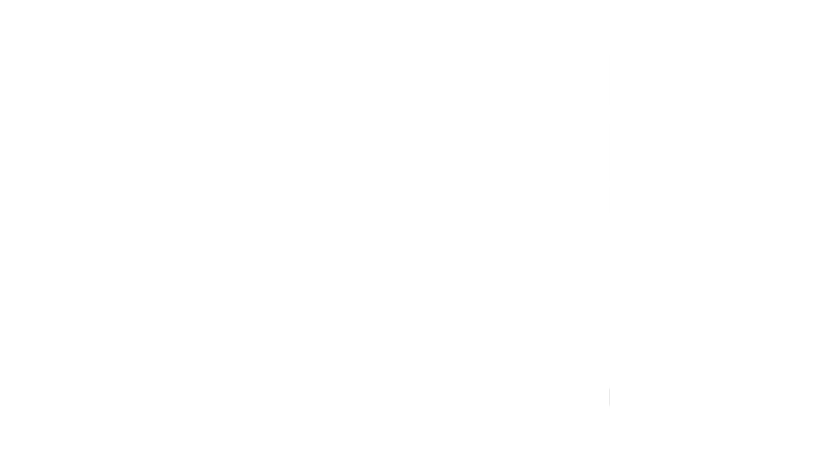
- Type: Private company
- Industry: video games
- Founded: 2014; 12 years ago
- Founder: Jussi Pullinen; Toni Enström; Heikki Sillanpääm
- Headquarters: Helsinki, Finland
- Products: Pako series
- Website: www.treemengames.com

Tree Men Games is a mobile game developer studio based on Helsinki, Finland. It is known for developing the Pako series.

== History ==
Tree Man Games was created in 2013 by Jussi Pullinen, Toni Enström and Heikki Sillanpää, Aalto University students when they developed Picnic Rumble as a summer project. They got funds from Microsoft and Nokia for the game and officially founded the company in 2014 on Helsinki.

== Games ==
- Picnic Rumble (2013)
- PAKO - Car Chase Simulator (2014)
- PAKO Lite (2015)
- PAKO 2 (2017)
- PAKO Forever (2018)
- HELI 100 (2019)
- Astalo (2020)
- PAKO Caravan (2020)
- PAKO Rumble (2021)
- PAKO 3 (2021)
- PAKO Highway (2022)
- PAKO 4 (2025)

== Awards ==
- Small Screen Game of the Year (2022, Pako Highway)
- Small Screen Game of the Year (2021, Pako 3)
