= Pako 2 =

2017 video game

PAKO 2
- Developer: Tree Men Games
- Publisher: Tree Men Games
- Series: PAKO
- Engine: Unity
- Platforms: Microsoft Windows, Linux, macOS, iOS, Android
- Release: Windows,macOS: WW: November 16, 2017; iOS: WW: January 31, 2018; Android: WW: April 4, 2018; Linux: WW: June 25, 2024
- Genres: Action, Racing
- Mode: Single-player

Pako 2 is a car chase driving and shooting game developed and published by Tree Men Games.

Pako 2 was released on November 16, 2017, for Microsoft Windows and macOS in Steam and later released on Android and iOS on January 31, 2018. In summer 2024, there was an unexpected game update and Linux support was added on Steam, along with other features.

== Gameplay ==
In Pako 2, the player drives a range of cars in selected levels. The objective of the player is to deliver different groups of robbers to their designated locations. This grants player various bonus items (perks) that make player more powerful during a game run. The longer the player survives, the tougher the cops will be, and more of them will appear. The player also has the option of performing a drive-by shooting at police cars while on the run. Once the player's car bumps into any obstacle or is shot, they will loose health. Once that hits zero, the player dies. The game can be played in top-down bird's eye view or alternatively in the 3rd person chase view.

Gameplay varies on different versions of the game. Such as the PC version, where the player has the goal of completing a certain amount of objectives, but has the option to escape. Escaping gives the player the full money reward, while dying results in a penalty on the overall money. The PC version also includes a "deck building" mechanic, where by the player can choose the order of power ups to appear, as well as the ability to upgrade your car and the option to aim your weapon, giving the game "Tank controls".

There are no in-app-purchases on Windows/Mac/Linux/iOS versions. In the Android version of game, in-game credits or real money (through in-app purchases) can be used to buy a variety of different vehicles, maps and power-ups in one's garage.

== Reception ==
Reception

Aggregate score
Aggregator	Score
Metacritic	iOS: 80/100

Pako 2 has received a score of 80 out of 100 on Metacritic,

== Pako - Car Chase Simulator ==
Pako - Car Chase Simulator
- Developer: Tree Men Games
- Publisher: Tree Men Games
- Series: PAKO
- Engine: Unity
- Platforms: Windows Phone, iOS, Android, Microsoft Windows
- Release: WW: May 2014
- Genres: Action, Racing
- Mode: Single-player

Pako 2 is a sequel of Pako - Car Chase Simulator, released in May 2014. In the first game the vehicle is only controllable by steering left or right without the gas pedal or brakes.

== Sequel ==
A sequel, Pako 3, was released for Android, iOS and PC, on December 2, 2021.
