= Nokia 2110 =

1994 cell phone model

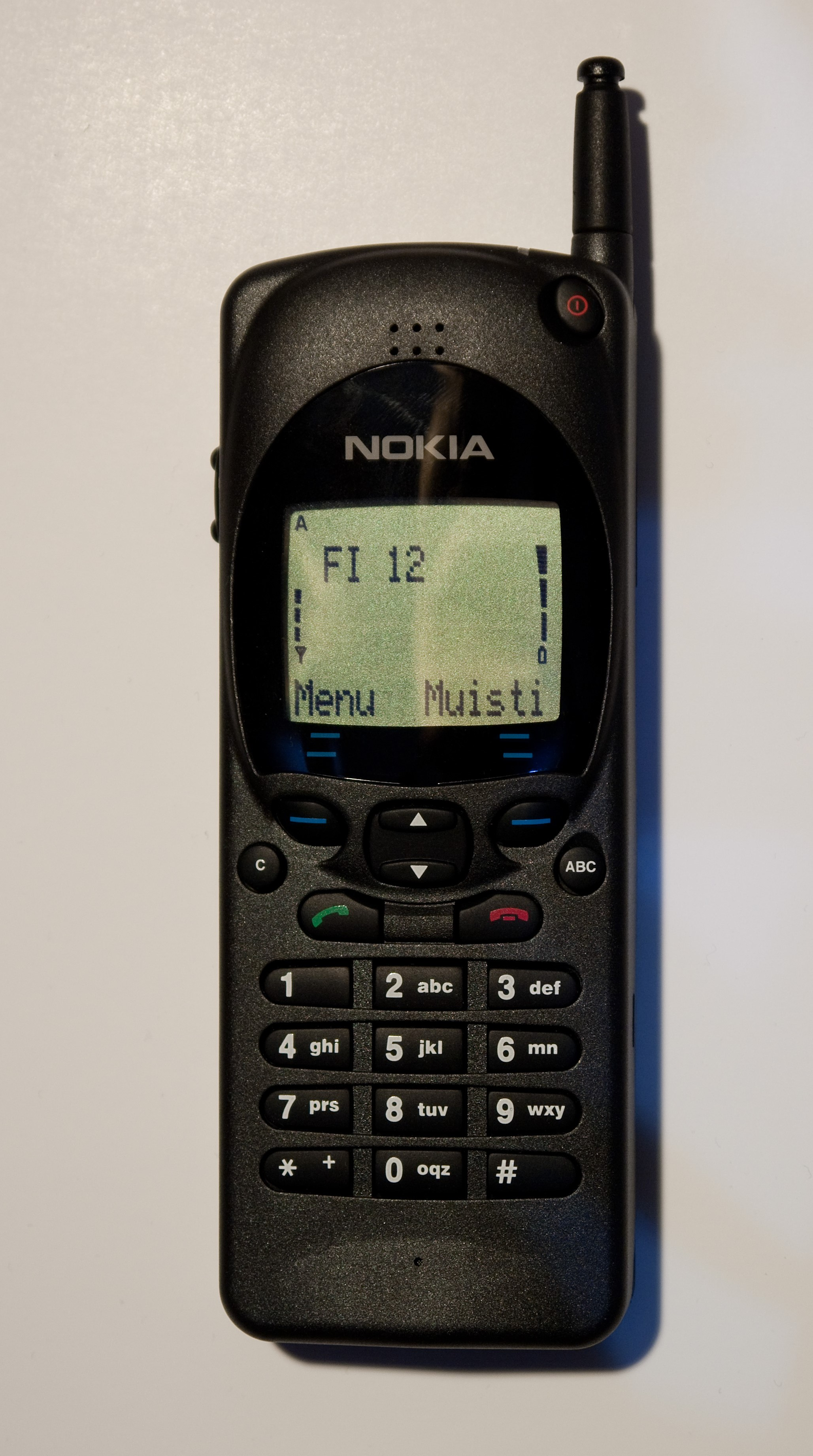
- Manufacturer: Nokia
- Availability by region: January 1994
- Discontinued: Yes
- Predecessor: Nokia 1011
- Successor: Nokia 6110 (2110/2110i); Nokia 6120 (2120); Nokia 6120i (2120 Plus); Nokia 6160 (2160); Nokia 6180 (2180); Nokia 6190 (2190); Nokia 8110 (2140); Nokia 8110i (2140i); Nokia 8146 (2146); Nokia 8148 (2148); Nokia 8148i (2148i); Nokia 9000 Communicator (2170)
- Compatible networks: GSM 900/1800/1900 (2110/2140/2190)
- Rear camera: No
- Display: Monochrome graphic

The Nokia 2110 is a cellular phone made by the Finnish telecommunications firm Nokia, first announced and released in January 1994. It is the first Nokia phone with the famous Nokia tune ringtone. The phone can send and receive SMS messages; and lists 10 outgoing calls, 10 incoming calls and 10 missed calls. At the time of the phone's release, it was smaller than others of its price and had a bigger display, so it became very popular. It also features a "revolutionary" new user interface featuring with two dynamic softkeys, which would later lead to the development of the Navi-key on its successor, the Nokia 6110, as well as the Series 20 interface.

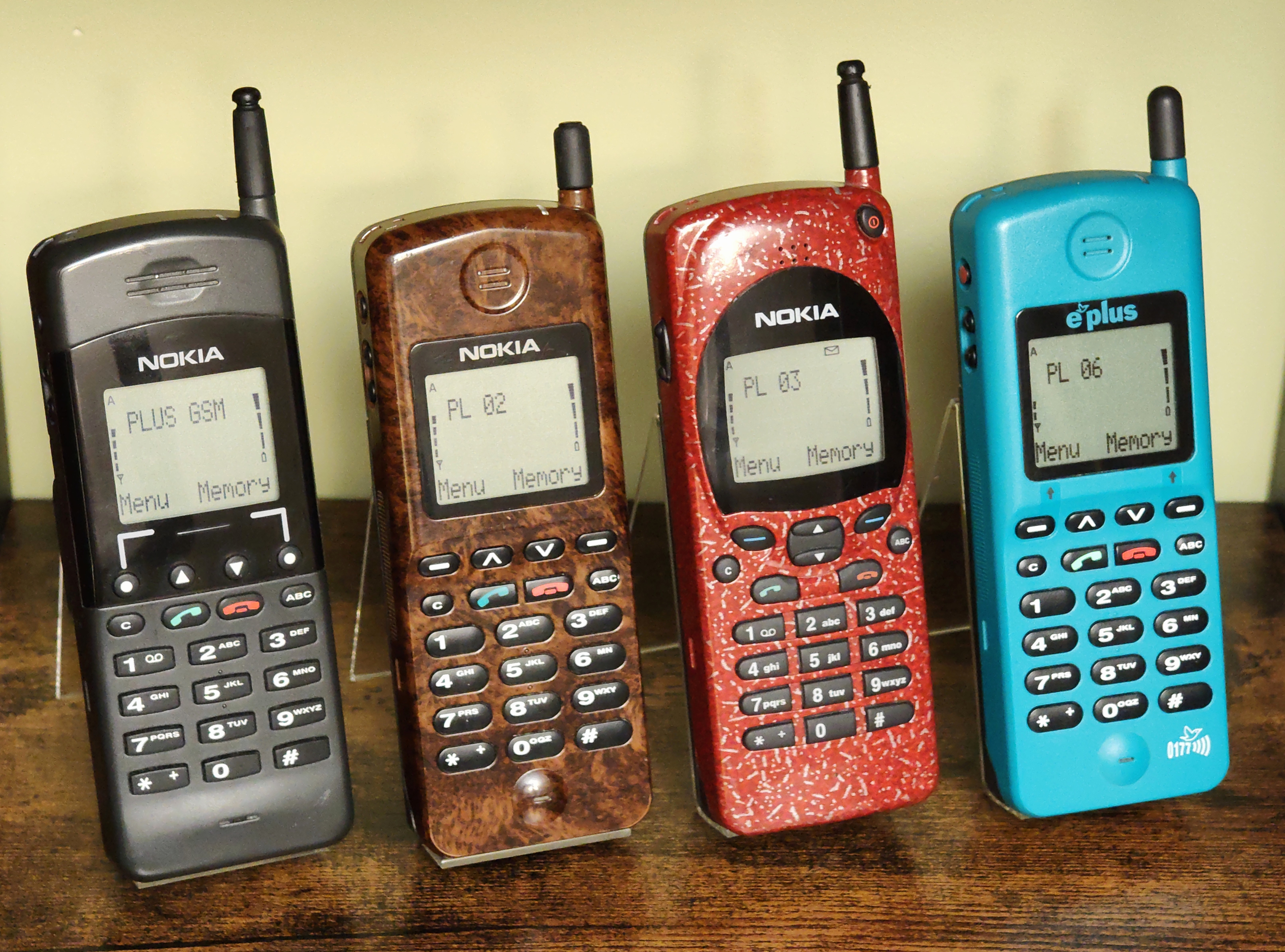
Four Nokia phones from the 2110 family. From the left: Nokia 880, Nokia-Technophone 880, Nokia 2110i, Nokia 2148i

A later version, the Nokia 2110i, released in 1996, comes with more memory and a protruding antenna knob.

A variant model, the Nokia 2140 (more popularly called the Nokia Orange), is the launch handset on the Orange network (now EE). It differed in that it was designed to work on the 1800 MHz frequency then utilised by Orange, and had a slightly less bulbous design.

A North American model, the Nokia 2190, was also available. It is one of the earlier phones available on the Pacific Bell Mobile Services and Powertel's newly launched GSM 1900 network in 1995. A version for Digital AMPS was produced as the Nokia 2120.

Another variant, the Nokia C6, was introduced in 1997 for Germany's analog C-Netz.

== See also ==
- HP OmniGo 700LX, a palmtop PC with built-in Nokia 2110
