= Nokia 8110 =

1996 cell phone model

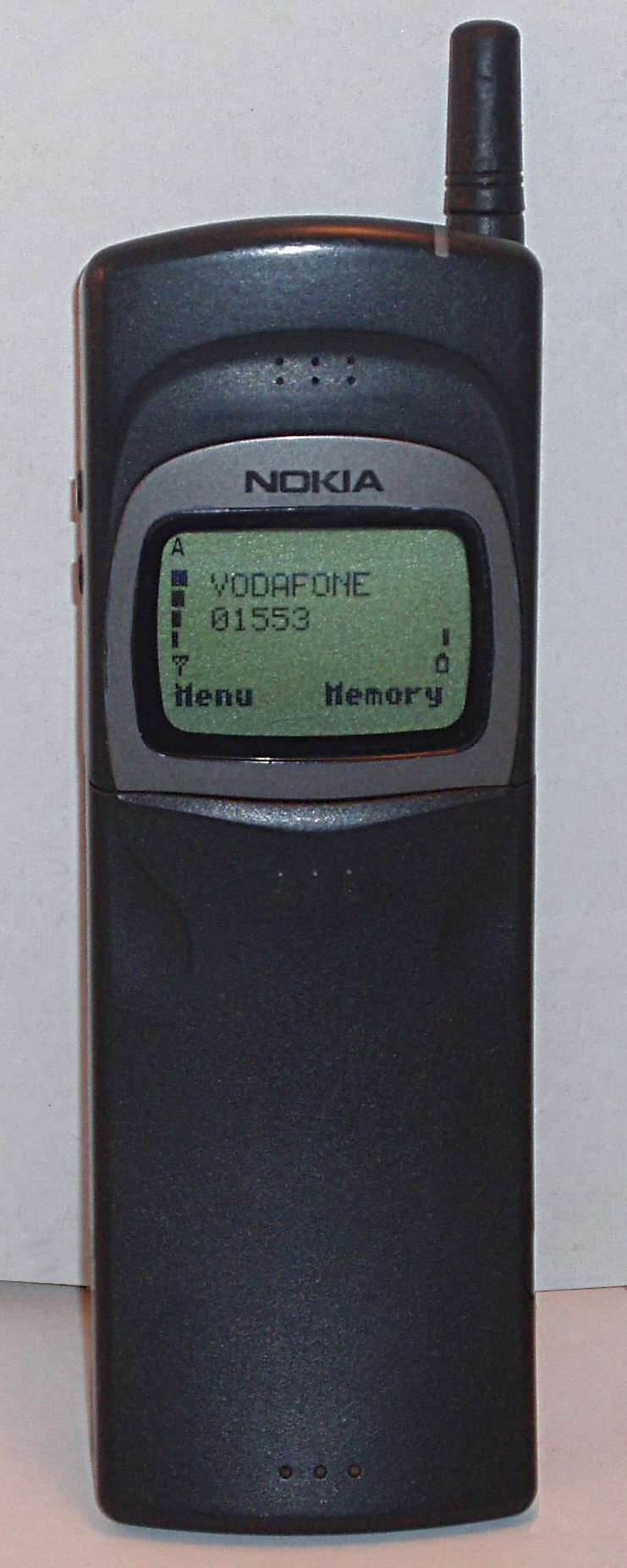
- The Nokia 8110i, with its distinctive slide cover closed.
- Manufacturer: Nokia
- Availability by region: Discontinued
- Predecessor: Nokia 2140 (8110); Nokia 2140i (8110i); Nokia 2146 (8146); Nokia 2148 (8148); Nokia 2148i (8148i)
- Successor: Nokia 7110 (8146); Nokia 7160 (8148); Nokia 7190 (8148i); Nokia 8110 4G (revival); Nokia 8810 (8110); Nokia 8860 (8110i)
- Related: Nokia 3110
- Compatible networks: GSM-900
- Form factor: Slider
- Dimensions: 141×48×25 mm (5.55×1.89×0.98 in)
- Weight: 145 g (5 oz)
- CPU: 16bit Hitachi H8
- Memory: No
- Removable storage: No
- Battery: Slim 400 mAh Li-Ion, Extended 900 mAh Li-Ion
- Display: Monochrome partly-graphic LCD

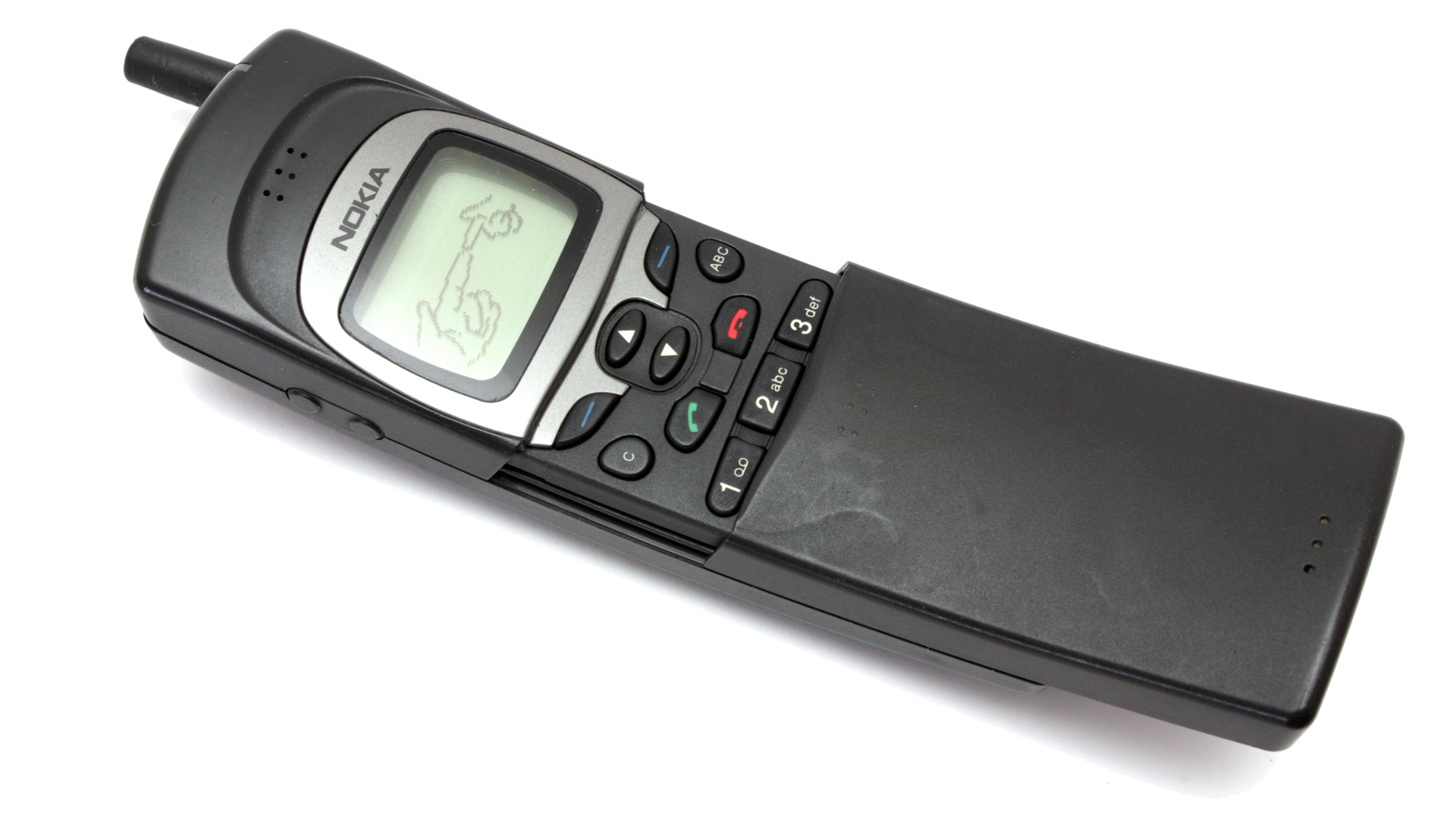
The Nokia 8110i with half-opened sliding cover.

Nokia 8110 is a mobile phone released in 1996. It was announced on 9 September 1996, as the first of Nokia's high-end 8000 series of phones. Its distinctive styling was the first example of a 'slider' form factor. A sliding cover protected the keypad when being carried in the pocket and extended downwards in use, bringing the microphone closer to the mouth. The action of opening the cover also answered an incoming call. The prominent curvature of the case, particularly when open, earned it the nickname "banana phone". It was also the first Nokia phone with monochrome graphic LCD.

The phone was designed for the business market and was one of the smallest and lightest (152 grams) phones on the market, but still had better battery life than its predecessor Nokia 2110.

The improved 8110i model, announced in March 1997, was the first phone with the SSMS (Smart SMS) engine. The handsets could be updated OTA (Over The Air) with an intelligent menu structure, which allowed simple information input, input which was sent through a simple structured text message to an MT receiver. This station could interpret information and send a structured text message back to the handset. Ring tone receiving by SMS was also part of the smart messaging protocol, so 8110i was also the first mobile phone to support it. Nokia later stopped marketing Smart messaging and concentrated on the upcoming WAP standard, but has not dropped smart messaging support from later phones. The 8110 is visually the same as the 8110i, apart from on the earlier model, the Nokia logo appears in white. 8110 and 8110i models were succeeded by Nokia 8810 in 1998, while the 8146 and 8148 models were succeeded by Nokia 7110 in 1999. In 1997 the phone cost approximately 465 GPB.

Nokia 8110, connected to a network in 2026

== Cultural references ==
An altered version of this phone was famously featured in the science fiction action film The Matrix (1999), for which it was modified featuring a spring-loaded mechanism (this actually appeared on the Nokia 7110).

== Variants ==
- The Nokia 8146/8148 for the GSM-1800 band.
- The Nokia 3110 shared the same engine.

== See also ==
- Nokia 8110 4G
- Samsung SPH-N270, the phone from The Matrix Reloaded
