= Snakes (N-Gage game) =

2005 video game

- Developer: IOMO
- Publisher: Nokia
- Designers: J. Dan Scott, IOMO
- Platforms: N-Gage, S60 platform
- Release: WW: January 25, 2005
- Genre: Arcade
- Modes: Single-player, multiplayer

Snakes is an update to the classic Snake game from Nokia, developed by IOMO. It was released as a freely downloadable game compatible with the N-Gage phone.

== Features ==
- Viral distribution would allow the game to copy itself to another N-Gage using Bluetooth as the carrier.
- Single player game has 42 levels (37 on N-Series), with both square and hex grids available in the playfield. Higher levels allow the player to climb around the edges and play on both surfaces of the playfield.
- Up to four players can play in a multiplayer game using four N-Gage devices and bluetooth as the carrier.
- Nokia maintained a worldwide leaderboard of scores, once accessible through the N-Gage Arena service. Any N-Gage with a valid data plan could upload the high score from within the game. N-Gage Arena was closed in 2010.

== Compatibility ==
Although Snakes was primarily designed for the Nokia N-Gage platform, it was also once available for Nokia N95. Several other devices supported the optimized file mention earlier as well, one example was Nokia E65 which could support and run the game at a near-full framerate as on Nokia N95. However, there had been cases in which a phone which could support the game, which crashed promptly after launching the application.

== Reception ==
Reception

Aggregate score
Aggregator	Score
Metacritic	85/100

Review scores
Publication	Score
GamesMaster	90%
GameSpot	8.6/10
GameSpy	4/5
IGN	8.7/10

The game received "favorable" reviews according to the review aggregation website Metacritic.

== Sequel ==
A sequel titled Snakes Subsonic was released on May 22, 2008 for the second generation N-Gage platform. It was developed by Barking Lizards.
