= Nokia 8910i =

Mobile phone model

The Nokia 8910i is a luxury mobile phone by Nokia announced on 4 November 2002 and released in early 2003. It had a metal titanium casing and a chromium-plated keypad. It was a minor improvement over the Nokia 8910, with a new color screen (CSTN 4096 colors) and MMS capability. Both were succeeded by Nokia 8800. It is Nokia's only feature phone to include both monophonic ringtones and a color display.

The 8910i was one of the last Nokia models being sold with a monophonic playback of ringtones, among the 1100, despite having a polyphonic startup with a muffled sound, in ADPCM format.

The 8910i was discontinued in 2007.
