= Nokia 7110 =

1999 mobile phone by Nokia

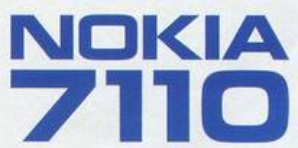

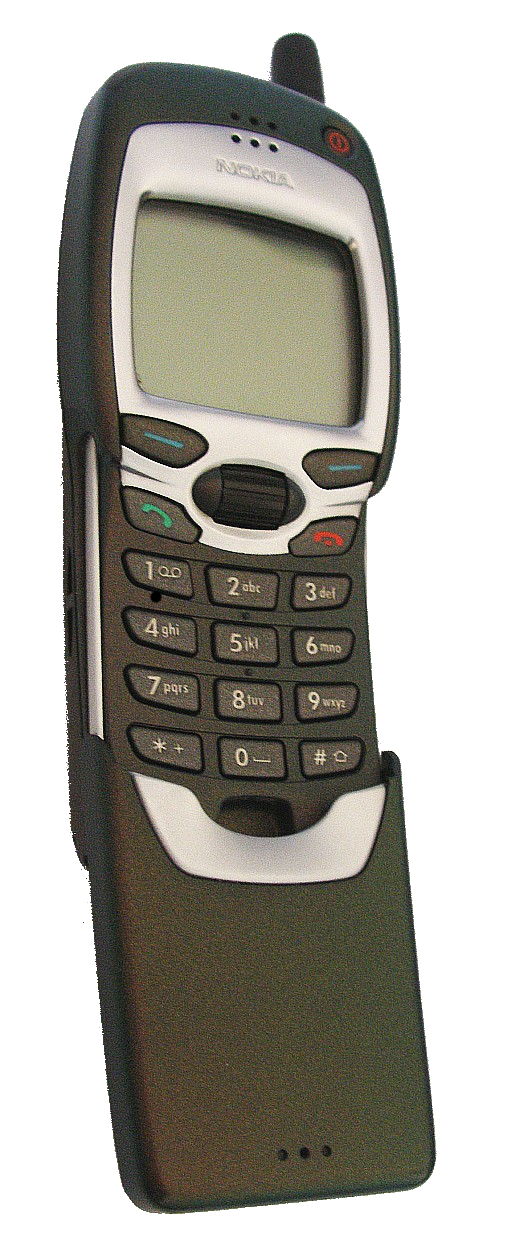
- A Nokia 7110 opened to expose its keypad
- Manufacturer: Nokia
- First released: July 1999
- Predecessor: Nokia 8146 (7110); Nokia 8148 (7160); Nokia 8148i (7190)
- Successor: Nokia 7650 (7110); Nokia 3660 (7160); Nokia 3600 (7190); Nokia 3620 (7190)
- Related: Nokia 8850; Nokia 8890
- Compatible networks: GSM 900/1800 (7110); TDMA 850/1900, AMPS 850 (7160); GSM 1900 (7190)
- Form factor: Slider
- Dimensions: 125 mm × 53 mm × 24 mm (4.92 in × 2.09 in × 0.94 in)
- Weight: 140 g (4.9 oz)
- Memory: No
- Removable storage: No
- SIM: Mini-SIM
- Battery: BPS-1, 600 mAh
- Display: 96x65 Monochrome graphic

The Nokia 7110 is a GSM mobile phone announced in February 1999 and released in October 1999. It was the first mobile phone to come with a WAP browser.

== Variants ==
=== Nokia 7110 (NSE-5) ===
The basic version, intended to be used in European GSM networks. It works in GSM 900/1800.

=== Nokia 7160 (NSW-5) ===
This version intended to be used in TDMA/AMPS networks. It works in TDMA 850/1900 and AMPS 850.

=== Nokia 7190 (NSB-5) ===
This version intended to be used in American GSM networks. It works in GSM 1900.

== Features ==
The 7110 was Nokia's second handset with a sliding cover that could be used to answer and terminate voice calls. As with the 8110 before, with the cover deployed, the microphone was brought closer to the user's mouth, improving the clarity of the voice reception. New to the 7110 was a spring-powered release mechanism, which would release the cover when a small metal catch on the rear of the handset was depressed. The cover could also be opened manually.

Connectivity is provided via a standard IrDA transceiver on the top edge of the handset. A serial cable can also be attached to the handset's expansion terminal, to allow synchronization of the phone's contents, and to allow the phone to function as a Modem. Data capabilities are limited to circuit switched data; GPRS was not available on this handset. The WAP mini-browser established a connection to the internet using CSD.

The navi-roller was used in place of the familiar up and down buttons, allowing the user to rapidly scroll through lists of options; depressing the roller selected the currently highlighted option.

The 7110 was the first cellular phone to implement the T9 Predictive text input method for composing SMS messages, but the 3210 was the first phone to combine both T9 and internal antenna.

Contrary to popular myth, although the Nokia 7110 does feature a spring-loaded cover concealing the keypad; this is not the model featured in the first Matrix movie, which is the Nokia 8110 (made three years prior), which was adapted with a spring mechanism to feature in the 1999 film.

Nokia 7110 came with Snake II installed.
