= Nokia 6110 =

Cell phone model

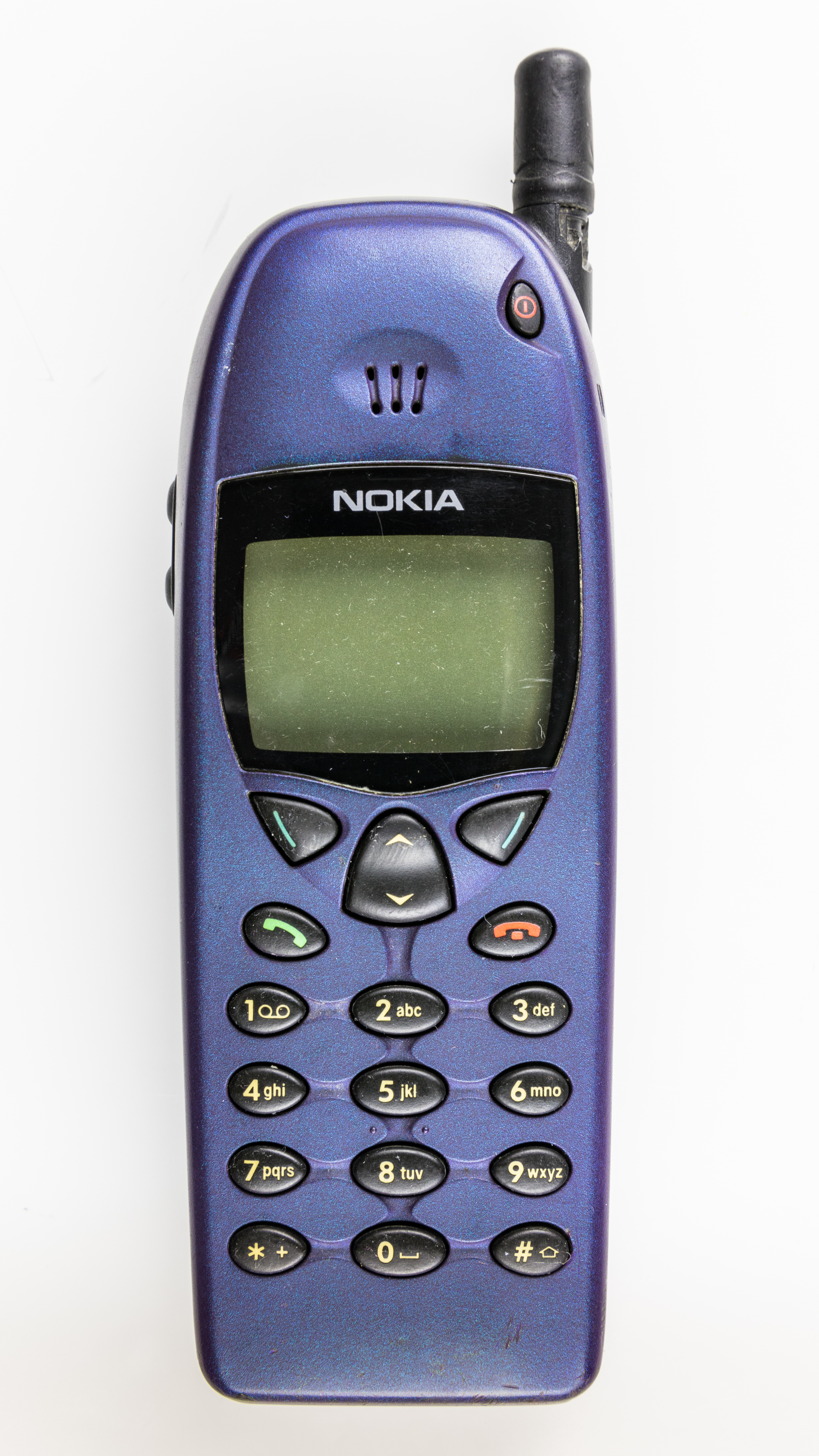
- Manufacturer: Nokia
- Availability by region: 1998
- Predecessor: Nokia 2110 (6110); Nokia 2120 (6120); Nokia 2120 Plus (6120i); Nokia 2160 (6160); Nokia 2160i (6160i); Nokia 2180 (6180); Nokia 2190 (6190)
- Successor: Nokia 6150 (6110); Nokia 6340 (6120); Nokia 6340i (6120i); Nokia 6360 (6160); Nokia 6370 (6180); Nokia 6385 (6185)
- Related: Nokia 5110
- Compatible networks: GSM 900 (Europe), GSM 1900 (US)
- Battery: Extended NiMH Battery 900 mAh

The Nokia 6110 is a GSM mobile phone from Nokia announced on 18 December 1997 and released in 1998. It was a hugely popular follower of the Nokia 2110 (1994), and the first of the many Nokia 6xxx series business-targeted phones. Main improvements over the 2110 were reduced size and improved talk time. It was built on the new third generation, Nokia DCT3 hardware platform, and was the first GSM phone to use an ARM processor and the first running on Nokia's Series 20 user interface.

The phone shared the same platform as the Nokia 5110 targeted at the consumer market; unlike the 5110, however, it had the advanced user interface with menu icons (it was the first phone with this new interface that would become the future standard), and featured an infra-red port (once again being Nokia's first phone with it). It was also the first phone from Nokia to have the popular Snake game pre-installed.

It was succeeded/complemented by the similar but enhanced 6150.

== Variants ==
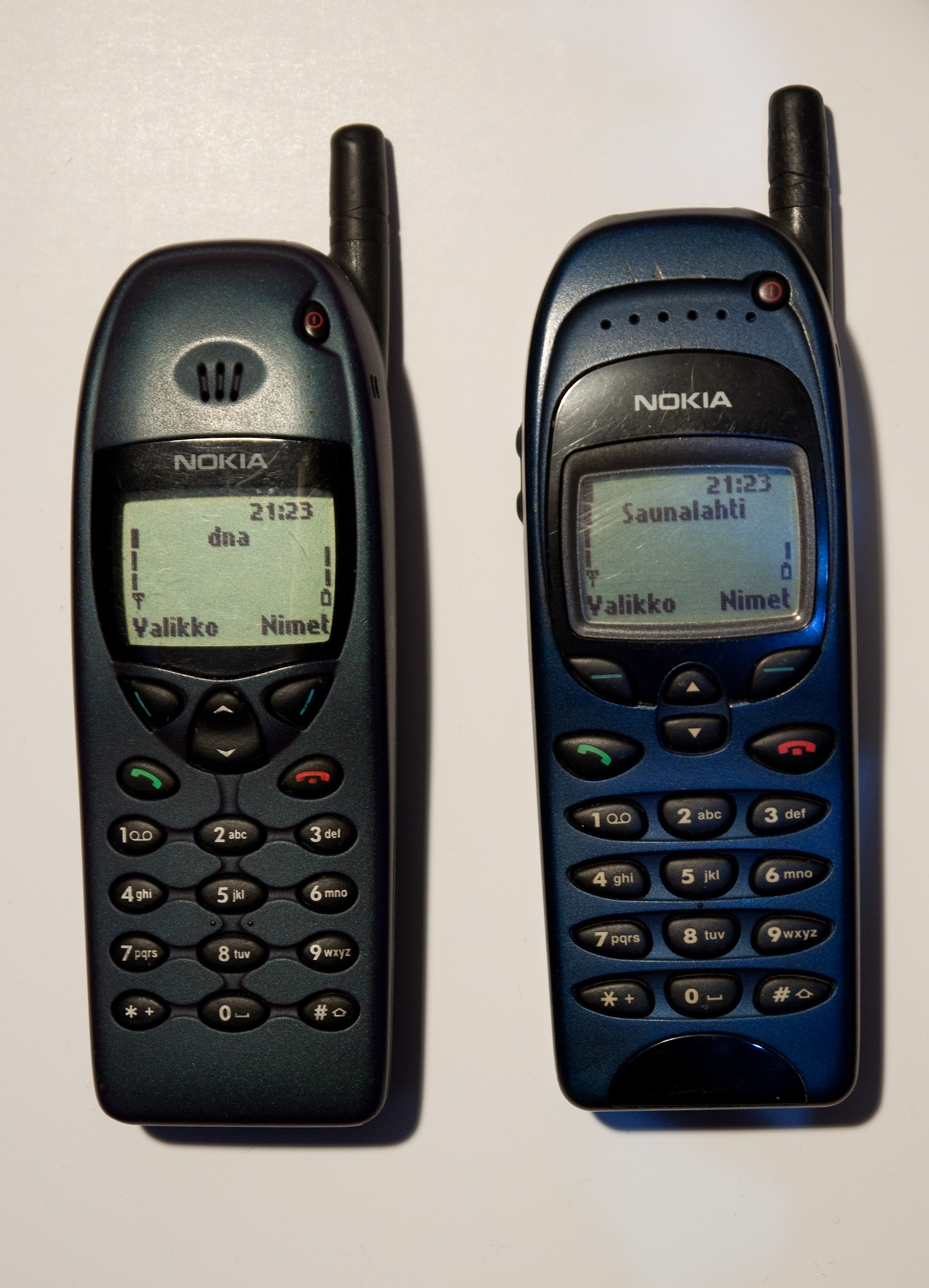
Nokia 6110 and 6150

Nokia 6190 is a version of the phone for the North American market, although the infra-red port was removed. Several non-GSM variants were also released aimed at the North American market, including the 800 MHz D-AMPS 6120 (not to be confused with the Nokia 6120 classic), the 800/1900 MHz D-AMPS 6160, and the 800/1900 MHz CDMA 6185. This was also known as the NK702 on the Orange UK network with a slightly different fascia, however the inside was identical. The GSM 1800 MHz variant was labeled 6130 and had the same exterior design changes, as the dual band GSM 900/1800 MHz 6150 model.

A license-built variant of the 6120 was manufactured and marketed by Gradiente in Brazil as the Gradiente Concept.

=== Phone features ===
- Three games: Memory, Snake (with two-player mode using two phones and IR connection), Logic
- Calculator, clock and calendar
- Currency converter
- Works as a pager
- Profile settings
- 4 colours
- LINK

==== Service ====
- GSM 900 (P-GSM only, not E-GSM) (Europe)
- GSM 1900 (US) (6190)
- D-AMPS 800 MHz (US) (6120)
- D-AMPS 800/1900 MHz (US) (6160)
- IS-95/AMPS 800/1900 MHz (US) (6185)

=== Battery life ===
- Extended NiMH Battery 900 mAh
- Digital Talk Time up to 3.25 hours
- Digital Standby Time up to 200 hours
- Analog Talk Time up to 2 hours
- Analog Standby Time up to 50 hours

== See also ==
- List of Nokia products
