= Snake (1998 video game) =

Mobile video game

- Developer: Nokia
- Programmer: Taneli Armanto
- Series: Snake
- Release: 1998 (Nokia 6110)
- Genre: Snake
- Mode: Single-player

Snake (Finnish: Matopeli) is a 1998 mobile video game created by Taneli Armanto as one of the three games included in the Nokia 6110 cellular phone. In the game, the player controls a snake in a playing field, collecting orbs which give the player points and make the snake grow in size while avoiding the walls and the snake's own longer body.

The game was developed by Armanto after the marketing team at Nokia wanted to include more custom options on their new phone. After initially trying to develop a Tetris-like game, Armanto began developing a game in the snake video game genre, which he was familiar with from older computer games.

Along with the other included games with the phone, Snake was the first video game released with sound for cellular phones. The game grew to a large popularity, with tournaments for the game being held in Finland and Australia. It is frequently cited as one of the greatest mobile games of all time. In November 2012, The Museum of Modern Art in New York announced that it would add Snake to its collection of 40 notable electronic games.

== Gameplay ==
The player controls the snake to collect orbs which appear.

In Snake, the player controls a snake via the number pad on the phone. It can be moved in four directions within a box the size of the screen. The goal is to collect the periodically spawning orbs that increase the score and also the length of the snake. Colliding with a wall or the body of the snake ends the game.

== Development ==
Snake was programmed by Taneli Armanto, who was part of a group responsible for the interface design at Nokia near his hometown in Finland. The marketing team at Nokia told Armanto's team to develop new applications for the phone as they wanted customers to have more things to do with their device. Armanto received the job to develop a game, as his colleagues believed he had experience in game development, which he did not.

Armanto initially thought of developing a Tetris-like game, but could not do it due to rights issues. Snake games were a long established concept at the time, dating to the 1976 arcade video game Blockade and home games such as Snake Byte (1982). Armanto decided to create a variation of them, stating he "respectfully borrowed some ideas from existing titles". The final choice to make Snake involved the infrared connection to allow for wireless data between devices, as Armanto felt this could be applied for a multiplayer version of the game. As the new Nokia phone was in the prototype stage, Armanto developed the game for a previous generation device. The two-player mode did not get tested as the previous phone lacked the infrared link.

Armanto had no restrictions outside the size of the game and visuals, as the whole operating system for the phone could only have one megabyte of memory and the screen was a low-resolution monochrome display. The graphics in the game were directly programmed in machine code.

=== Release ===
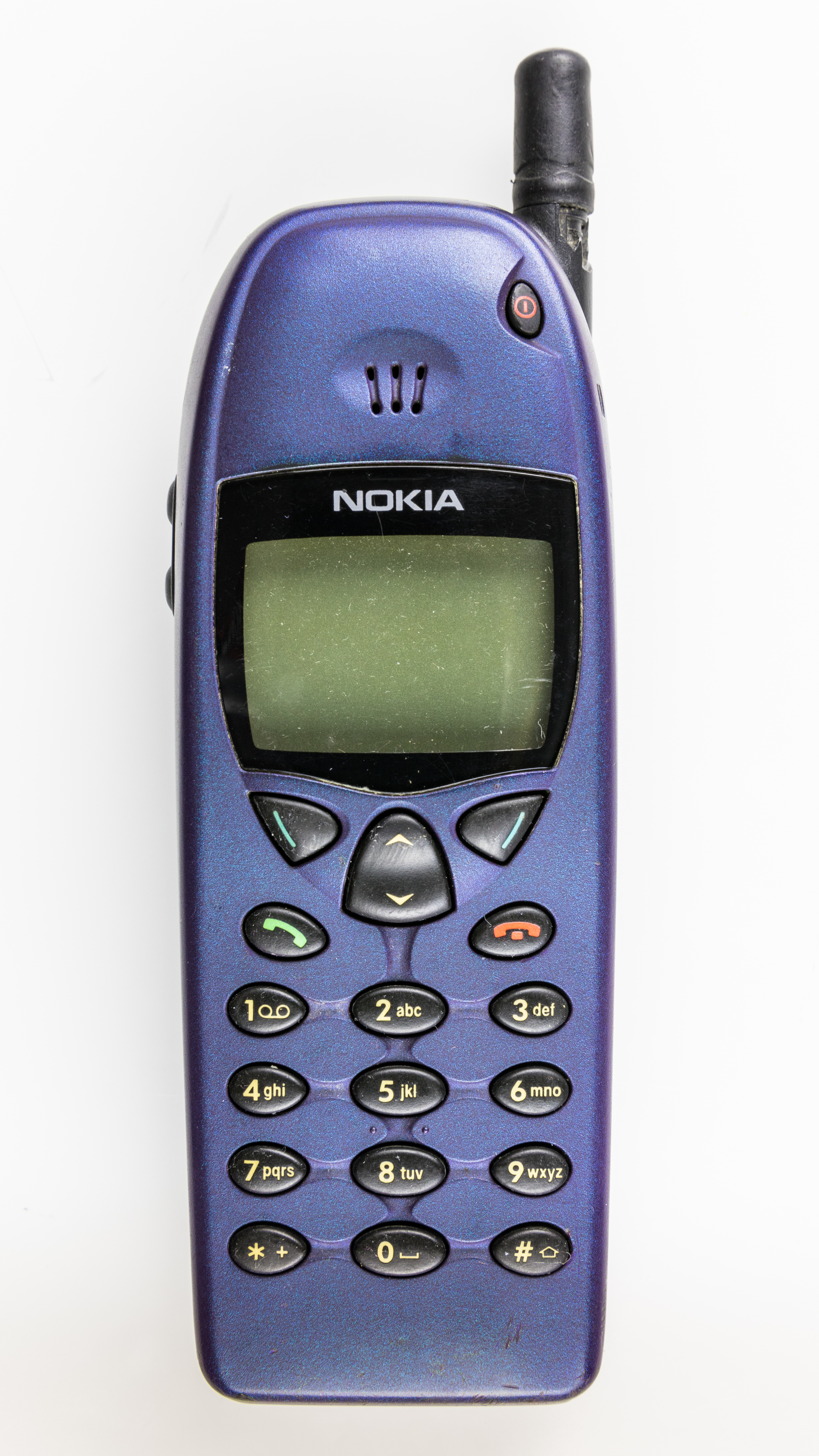
Snake was first included on the Nokia 6110 (pictured) and Nokia 5110 cellular phones.

Snake was released for the Nokia 6110 and Nokia 5110 in 1998. The title Snake translated to Käärme for Finnish audiences which Armanto felt was "a bit awkward for Finns", and had it titled Matopeli, which loosely translated to "A Game of Worms". Along with Snake, the phone also included a simple logic game (Logic) and a memory game (Memory).

=== Successors ===
Gameplay of Snakes Subsonic, a modern 3D iteration, released in 2008 on N-Gage 2.0

Several reiterations of the game were released before the final version in 2007. The sequels were made without Armanto's involvement by bigger teams. Snake II was included on the Nokia 7110. Snake EX was released in 2002 for Nokia 9290 and Snake EX2 was released in 2003 for Nokia 3300. Snake III was also released in 2005 for Series 40 J2ME phones. Snakes was released in 2005 on the N-Gage. In the same year, Snake Xenzia was released for Nokia 1600 and other Nokia Series 30 and Series 30+ (based on MediaTek MAUI) devices. The final title was Snakes Subsonic, released in 2007 for N-Gage 2.0.

In 2017, Gameloft developed and released the 2017 version of Snake as the pre-installed game for several Nokia's Series 30+ and KaiOS devices, such as Nokia 3310 (2017), Nokia 8110 4G, Nokia 2720 Flip and Nokia 5310 (2020). The company has also launched a new version of Snake Xenzia in the same year. Since 2019, HMD Global developed and released a port of 2017 Gameloft version for some Series 30+ devices based on Mocor RTOS developed by Unisoc, which uses the similar design, but the animation and gameplay was very similar to the Snake II.

Since 2024, HMD Global and Gameloft released some special themes for 2017 version of Snake:

- In 2024, HMD Global and Gameloft released Barbie's theme of the 2017 version of Snake, called Malibu Snake for HMD Barbie Phone.
- In 2025, HMD Global released FC Barcelona's theme of the 2017 version of Snake, called FC Barcelona Snake for HMD Barça 3210.

In 2024, HMD Global released Quick Snake for Heineken's The Boring Phone, which looks like some Snake variants in Nokia devices with monochrome screens, but made the game much shorter to promote "digital detox" as a marketing point.

== Reception and legacy ==
According to Nokia, 350 million copies of the game exist globally in some form, though Armanto believes that the number is likely much higher. At the turn of the millennium, Nokia organized two Snake Finnish Championships. Similar events were held globally, such as in Australia where 30 players managed to get the highest score possible, 2,008 points on the highest difficulty setting. In his book Replay: The History of Video Games, Tristan Donovan stated the game was simple and compelling designed to be played in short sessions, declaring that mobile games took over the niche once held by arcades by providing short moments of gaming with the advantage of communication features and mobility.

Some sources state Snake to be the first mobile phone game, though there was a Tetris-like game for the Hagenuk MT-2000 in 1994, four years earlier. Quinn Myers of MEL Magazine described Snake as the first major mobile game. It was the first mobile phone to include a game with sound. In November 2012, The Museum of Modern Art in New York announced that it wanted to add Snake to its collection of notable electronic games.

In 2015, Armanto released a spiritual successor to Snake in partnership with Rumilus Design called Snake Rewind.

== See also ==
- History of mobile games
- Snake (video game genre)
- Space Impact
