= 2600 =

2600 may refer to:

- 2600 hertz, the audio tone used in phreaking to gain control of telephone networks
- 2600: The Hacker Quarterly, a magazine named after the aforementioned 2,600 Hz tone
- Atari 2600 video game console
- ATI's Radeon R600 Radeon HD 2xxx series graphics card
- ARP 2600 analog synthesizer
- Alfa Romeo 2600, an executive car
- Nokia 2600, a mobile phone released in 2004
- Nokia 2600 classic, a mobile phone released in 2008
- The last year of the 26th century
- The number 2600
- RTM build number of Microsoft's Windows XP operating system

== See also ==
- 2600 series (disambiguation)
