= Nokia 5210 =

Cell phone model

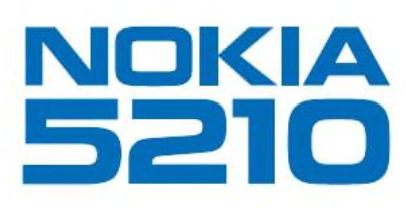

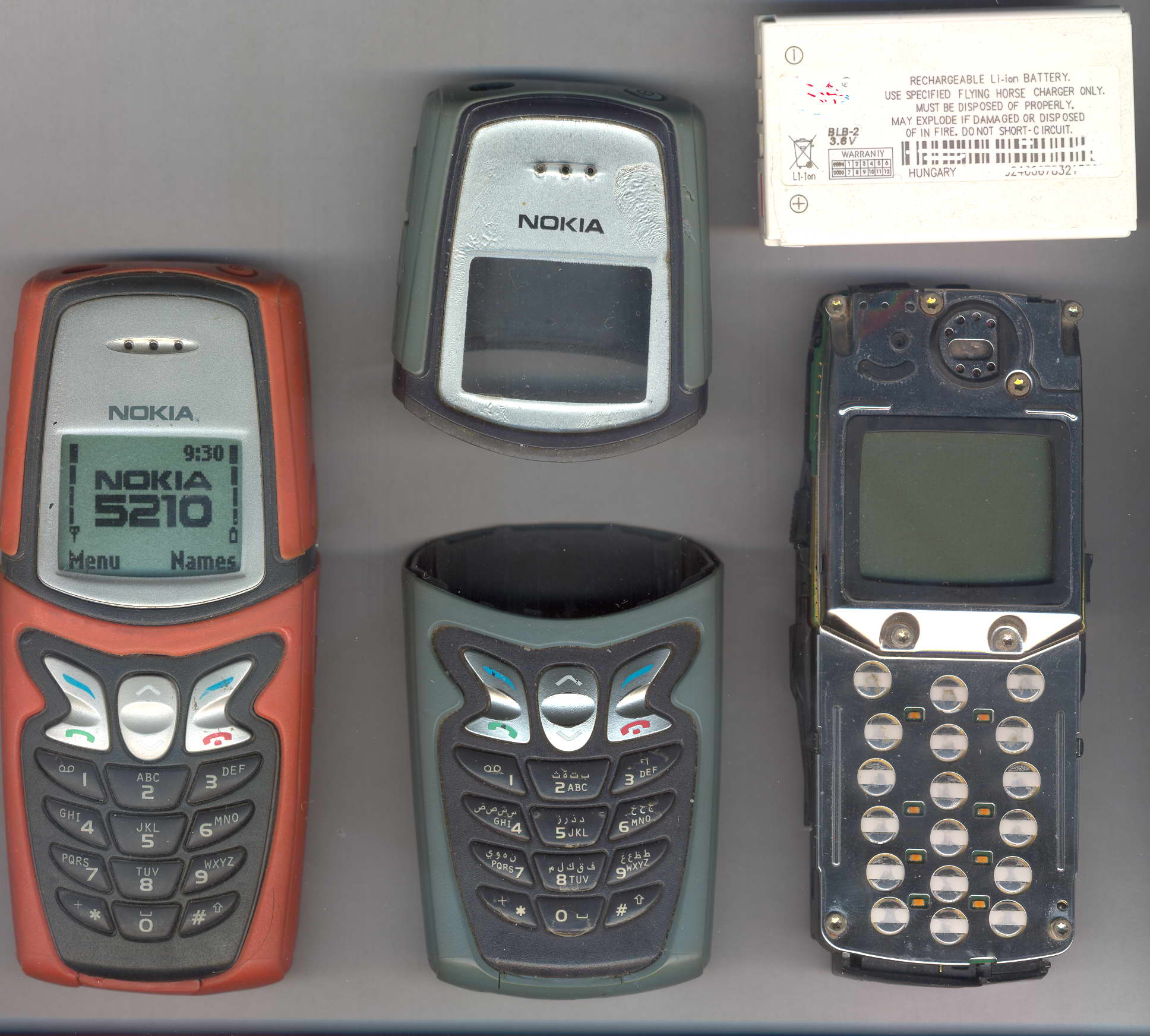
- Nokia 5210 and its removable Xpress-On covers.
- Manufacturer: Nokia
- Availability by region: 2002
- Predecessor: Nokia 6250
- Successor: Nokia 5100
- Related: Nokia 3410
- Compatible networks: GSM 900 1800
- Form factor: candy bar
- Dimensions: 105.5 mm (4.15 in) H 47.5 mm (1.87 in) W 22.5 mm (0.89 in) D
- Weight: 92 g (3.2 oz)
- Operating system: Series 20
- Battery: 750 mAh li-ion
- Rear camera: No
- Display: 5 lines
- Connectivity: Infrared
- Data inputs: Keypad

The Nokia 5210 is a mobile phone manufactured by Nokia. Announced on 19 November 2001, it was released in early 2002. The 5210 is designed for use in tough conditions and is dust, shock and water resistant. Many of the features are similar to the Nokia 3330/3350 (2001), which include WAP access over its CSD network. It features rubber Xpress-On covers, and a built-in thermometer. The thermometer displays the internal temperature of the phone's battery. This feature is also present on other phones that have "netmonitor" enabled.

Like most Nokia's phones, users can customize the case easily from its original colors: blue or orange mixed with silver and black. The 5210 is notably also the only Nokia phone with an orange backlight, unlike the green or blue ones on other Nokia models with a monochrome display.

The device runs on Series 20 and its calling features include Last Number Redial, Speed Dial, Conference Call, and Call Waiting. The basic calling features such as Hold, Un-hold, End all calls, Mute and Transfer are available as well. Productivity tools and utilities are available such as Calculator, Countdown Timer, Stopwatch, Thermometer, and Calendar. It shares the same pre-loaded games as the Nokia 3330, which include Snake II, Space Impact, Bantumi, Pairs II and Bumper.

Moreover, the phone has a built-in infrared interface which allows data transfers to any device that is equipped with an infrared interface. Nokia supplies free software to allow the phone book to be edited and text messages to be typed, sent and read from the PC.

The phone supports 17 languages for the menu interface and 11 languages for the T9 dictionary.

== Bugs ==
Some versions of the Nokia 5210 firmware, particularly the Arabic models, contains a bug with the Arabic language text, that occurs when user tries to type SMS, the space between words in Arabic becomes a small rectangular symbol instead of a space.

== Successor ==
The 5210 was superseded by the Nokia 5100.
