= 5100 =

5100 may refer to:

== Time ==
- A.D. 5100, a year in the 6th millennium CE
- 5100 BC, a year in the 6th millennium BCE

== Products ==
- Atari 5100, a home videogame console
- GWR 5100 Class, a class of side tank steam locomotive
- Hankyu 5100 series, an electric multiple unit train class
- IBM 5100 (IBM Portable Computer), one of the first portable computers
- Jabiru 5100, an aircraft engine
- JGR Class 5100, a class of steam locomotive
- Nokia 5100, a GSM cellphone

== Other uses ==
- 5100 Pasachoff, an asteroid in the Asteroid Belt, the 5100th asteroid registered
- 5100, a number in the 5000 (number) range
