= 3320 =

3320 may refer to:

- A.D. 3320, a year in the 4th millennium CE
- 3320 BC, a year in the 4th millennium BCE
- 3320, a number in the 3000 (number) range

== Other uses ==
- 3320 Namba, an asteroid in the Asteroid Belt, the 3320th asteroid registered
- ALFA-PROJ Model 3320, a handgun
- Nokia 3320, a cellphone
- Texas Farm to Market Road 3320, a state highway
