= Nokia 5510 =

2001 cell phone model

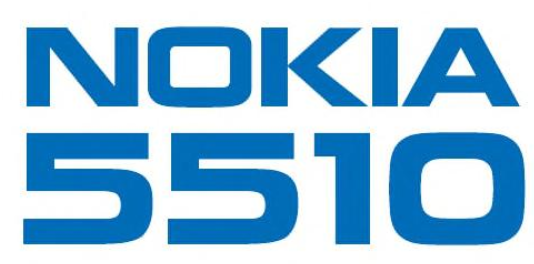

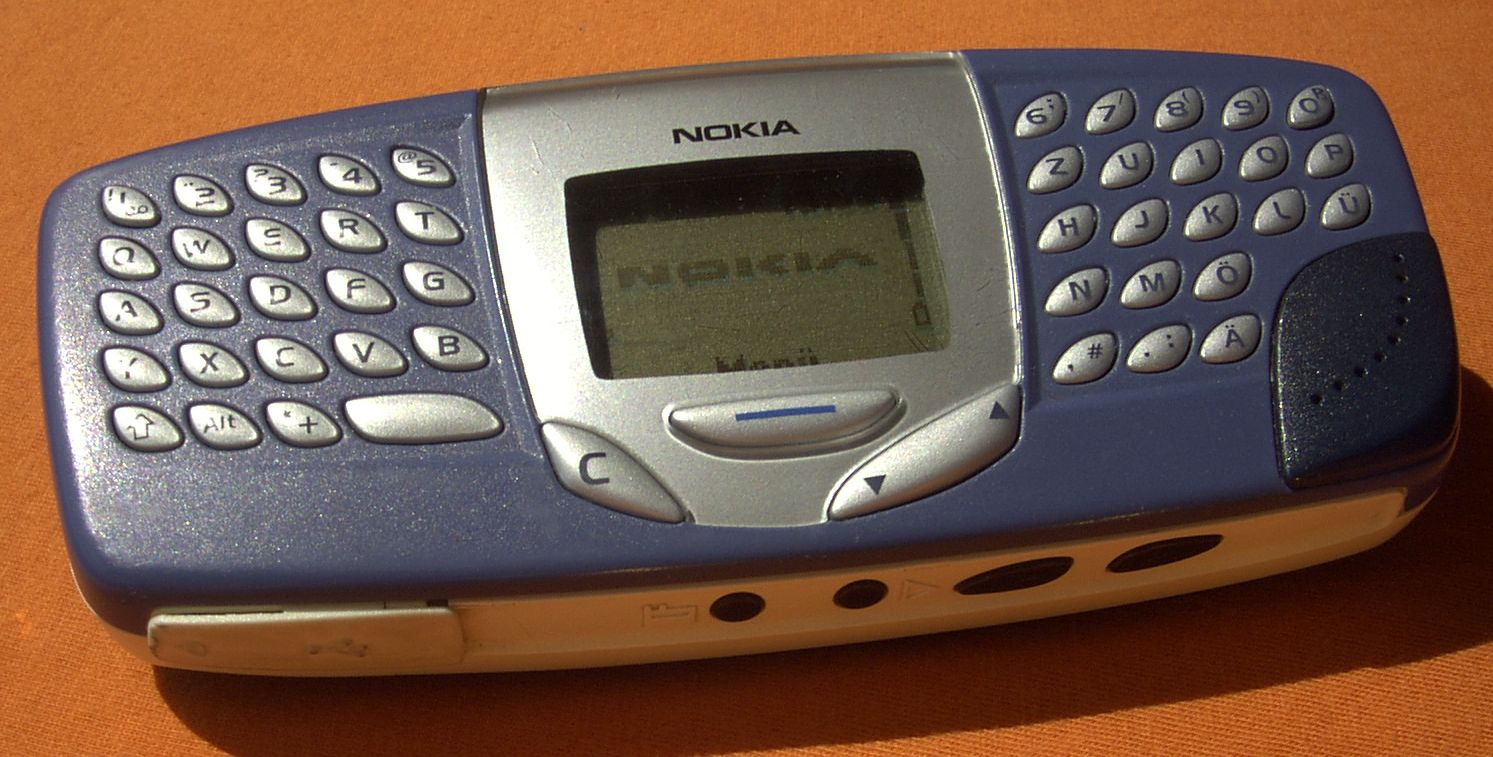
- Nokia 5510's UI menu icon.
- Manufacturer: Nokia
- Predecessor: Nokia 3210
- Successor: Nokia 3300; Nokia 6800 series Nokia N-Gage; Nokia C3-00
- Compatible networks: 2G GSM900 / GSM1800
- Form factor: Block
- Dimensions: 134×58×28 mm (5.3×2.3×1.1 in)
- Weight: 155 g (5 oz)
- Storage: 64 MB
- Battery: Li-Ion 950 mAh
- Display: 5 lines Monochrome
- Media: MP3, WAV, FM radio
- Connectivity: Mini USB / ADE-2 Audio Line in / DKE-2

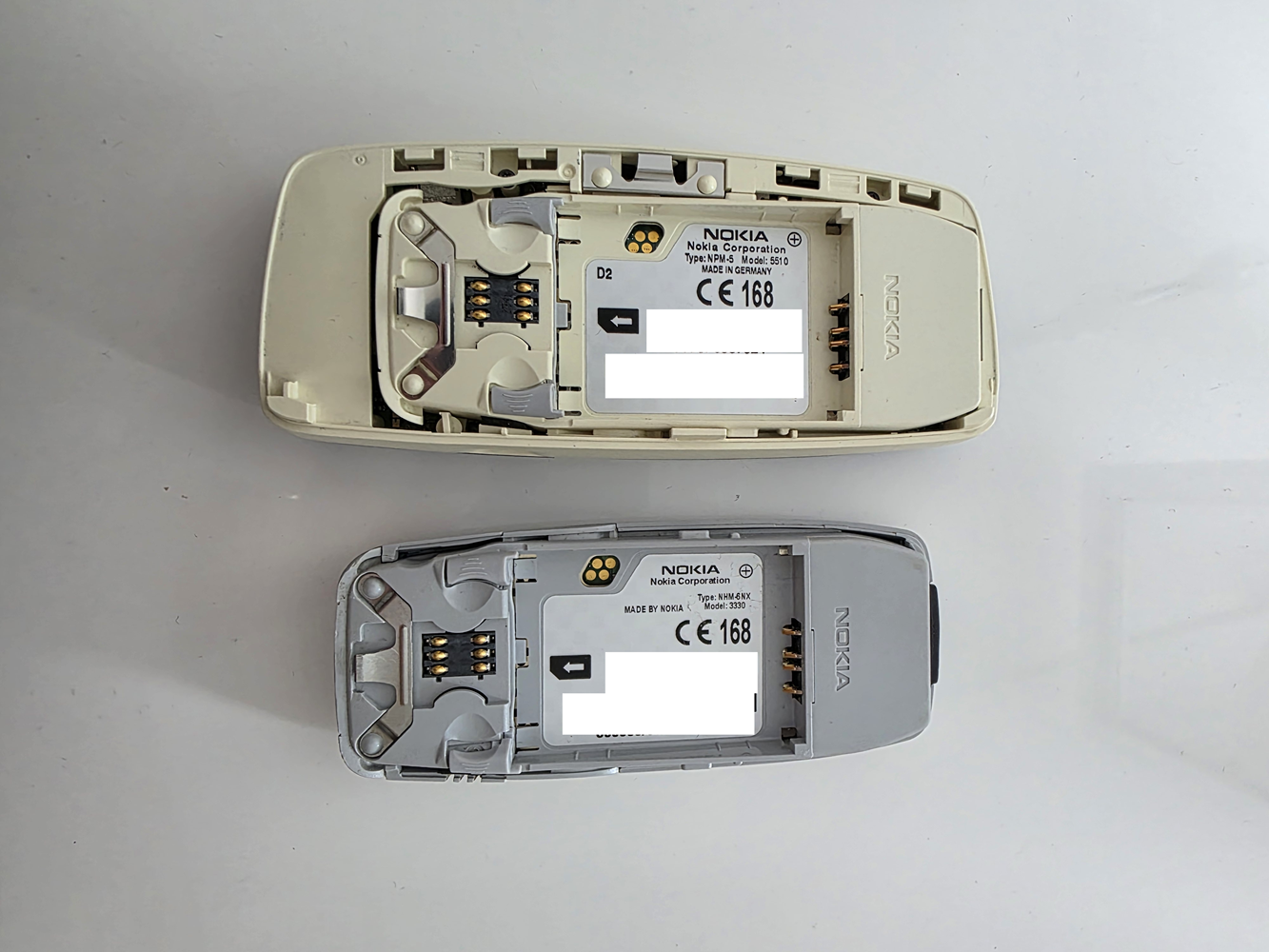
The open back of a Nokia 5510 and a Nokia 3330, showing their similarities.

The Nokia 5510 is a mobile phone announced on October 11, 2001 and released in December of that year. The Nokia 5510 features a full QWERTY keyboard, an 84 x 48 monochrome display, and is notable for its digital music player, the company's first mobile phone with music player capabilities. It has a 64 MB memory for storing audio files.

== Features ==
The 5510 shared many of the features of the Nokia 3310 due to both phones sharing components with each other, such as a built-in calculator, stopwatch and a reminder function. It also includes the same five games that came with the Nokia 3330: Snake II, Space Impact, Bumper, Bantumi, and Pairs II. However, the 5510 also had the ability to play digital music files transferred onto its 64 MB internal flash memory via USB encoded in LSE format via the included Nokia software (from either MP3 or WAV format); as well as being able to receive FM radio.

== Design ==
Compared to other mobile phones of its generation, the 5510 is unusual in that it has an almost complete QWERTY keyboard, rather than the conventional telephone keypad. This keyboard is divided on the left and right sides of the front panel, with the 84 x 48 monochrome display at the center, and the navigational buttons below it (the display and navigational buttons are almost identical to those found on the 3310). Also, four black buttons are located on the side of the phone to allow quick access to the music player, FM radio, and the volume controls.

The removable backplate on the handset was designed in such a way that pressure on the middle of the plastic could easily cause the plate to crack; this was highlighted in many reviews of the model at the time of release.

== Music ==
The 5510 could play both MP3 and AAC audio files but not in their usual formats, instead the files must be encrypted and packaged into a Lockstream Embedded (.lse) files, which was a DRM technology that ensured that the encrypted files could only be played on the device. This encryption could be achieved using the bundled Nokia PC Suite software. Additionally it could record AAC audio directly from its internal FM radio, or through its built-in 2.5 mm (3/32 in) audio jack to another format with the extension .rel which only the phone could play back. The music player on the phone also has a built-in equalizer with several pre-sets to fine-tune the music being played.

== Software ==
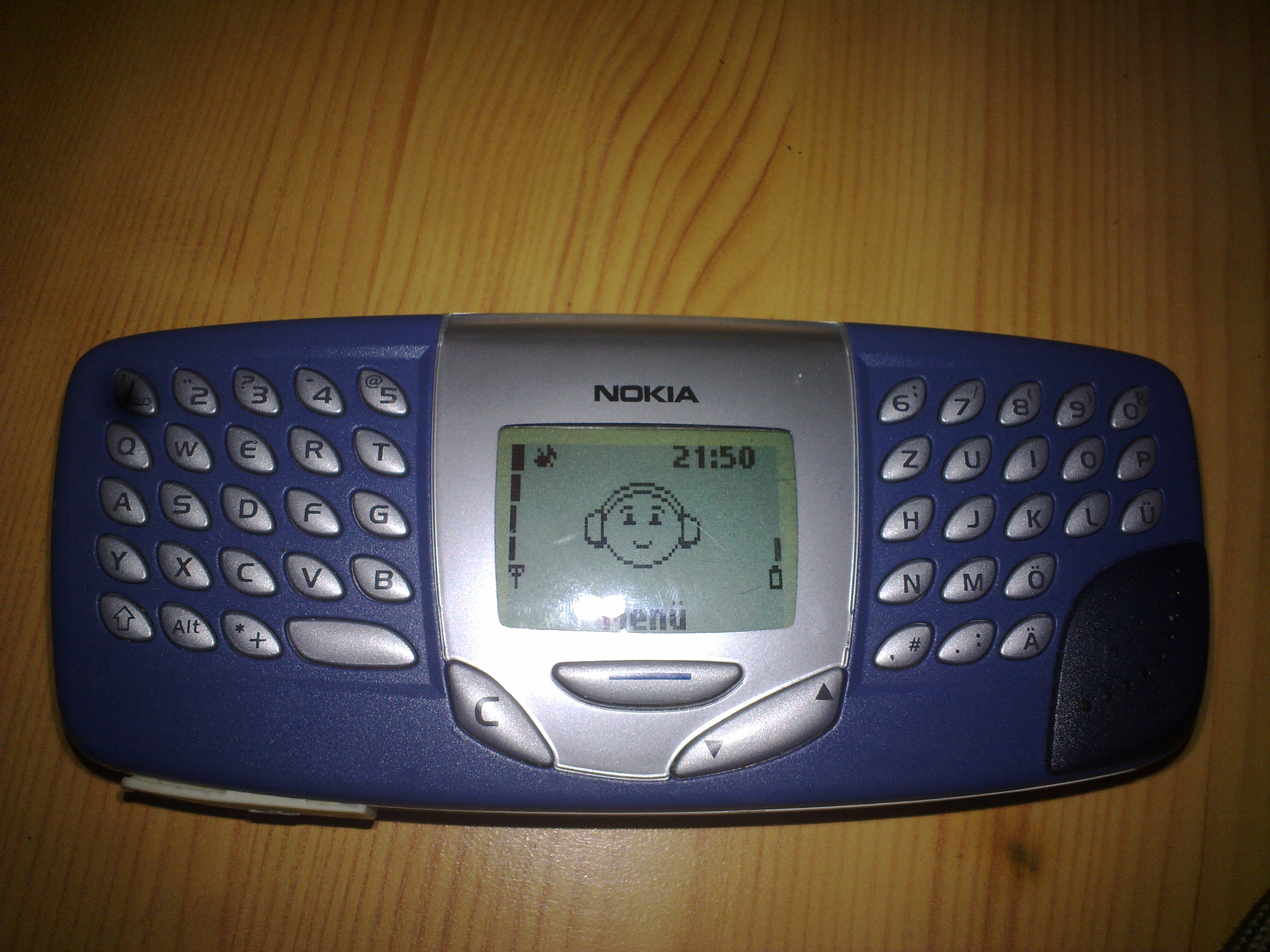
The Nokia 5510 bears heavy design similarities to the 3310.

The bundled version of the Nokia Audio Manager software was designed to encode music and transfer it to the phone via USB, but encoding would typically take several minutes per song and the software only ran under Windows. The design was that files encoded and transferred to the device could not be converted back to their original formats for playing on other devices.

However alternatives to the Nokia Audio Manager did exist, such as Nokryptia, a cross-platform command line tool distributed as source code which by exploiting a special case of the Lockstream Embedded file format could convert MP3 audio files almost instantly to the 5510 playable Lockstream Embedded format. Nokryptia worked by prefixing the MP3 file with a special header that then allowed the MP3 to follow unencrypted (the tool also supported the reverse, removing the header to restore the original MP3 file, however this was only possible on files encoded by the technique and the tool could not restore a file encoded by the Nokia Audio Manager).
