= 3410 =

3410 may refer to:

- A.D. 3410, a year in the 4th millennium CE
- 3410 BC, a year in the 4th millennium BCE
- 3410, a number in the 3000 (number) range

== Other uses ==
- 3410 Vereshchagin, an asteroid in the Asteroid Belt, the 3410th asteroid registered
- Nokia 3410, a cellphone
- Hawaii Route 3410, a state highway
- Texas Farm to Market Road 3410, a state highway
