= 5100 class =

5100 class or Class 5100 may refer to:

- GWR 5100 Class, 2-6-2T steam locomotives
- JGR Class 5100, 4-4-0 steam locomotives
