= 5140 =

5140 may refer to:

- A.D. 5140, a year in the 6th millennium CE
- 5140 BCE, a year in the 6th millennium BC
- 5140, a number in the 5000 (number) range

== Products ==
- Nokia 5140, a cellphone
- IBM 5140, the IBM PC Convertible, one of the first laptop computers
- SIG GL 5140, a variant of the SIG GL 5040, a grenade launcher

== Other uses ==
- 5140 Kida, an asteroid in the Asteroid Belt, the 5140th asteroid registered
