= Nokia 6250 =

Mobile phone

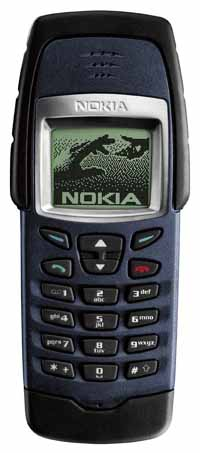
- Manufacturer: Nokia
- Successor: Nokia 5210
- Related: Nokia 6210
- Form factor: Candybar
- Dimensions: 142×50–58×23–27 mm (5.59×1.97–2.28×0.91–1.06 in)
- Weight: 167 g (5.89 oz)
- Display: 95 x 65 pixels, Monochrome LCD

The Nokia 6250 is a mobile phone made by Nokia. It has been available since 2000. It is a more rugged version of the Nokia 6210 phone. It has a monochrome graphic LCD of resolution 96 x 60 pixels. Its memory can hold up to 500 phone book records with up to three numbers per name, and up to 150 text messages (SMS). It was being sold mainly in Asia-Pacific markets.

Nokia 6250 specifications
General characteristics
Market release date	2001
Frequency ranges	GSM 900, GSM 1800
SAR	0.55 W/kg
Dimensions and weight
Weight	174
Size	142×58×27 mm
Volume	159 cm^{3}
Construction
Body type	tube
Antenna	built-in
Changeable panels	no
Dust, moisture, impact resistance	full protection (withstands heavy impacts and immersion in water)
Body color options	Dark Blue, Army Green, Sun Burnt Red, Broken Yellow
Body material	rubber (high strength plastic)
Calls
Type of melodies	tonal
The number of melodies	35
Vibrating bell	there are
Communication
Interfaces	IRDA
Internet access	WAP 1.1
Synchronization with a computer	there are
Messages
Additional functions of SMS	text input with a dictionary ( T9 Text Input®), message templates
MMS	no
Other functions
Speakerphone (built-in speaker)	no
Management	voice dial (10)
Sound coding modes HR, FR, EFR	there are
Screen
Screen type	monochrome screen
Screen size	96×60 (5 lines)
Illumination	green LED
Belarusianization	no
Multimedia capabilities
Built-in camera	no
Dictaphone	no
Games	yes
Memory card type	no
Battery
Battery type	Li-Ion (BLL-2)
Battery capacity	1200 mAh
Talk time	3 hours, 15 minutes – 5 hours, 50 minutes
Waiting time	72 hours – 336 hours
Charging time	2 hours, 45 minutes (using ACP-8)
Notebook and organizer
Notebook in the device	250 rooms
Organizer	alarm clock, calculator

== See also ==
- List of Nokia products
- Nokia 6210
