= Nokia 3300 =

Mobile phone model

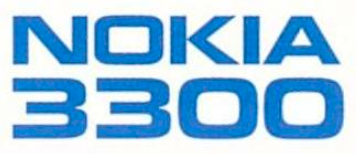

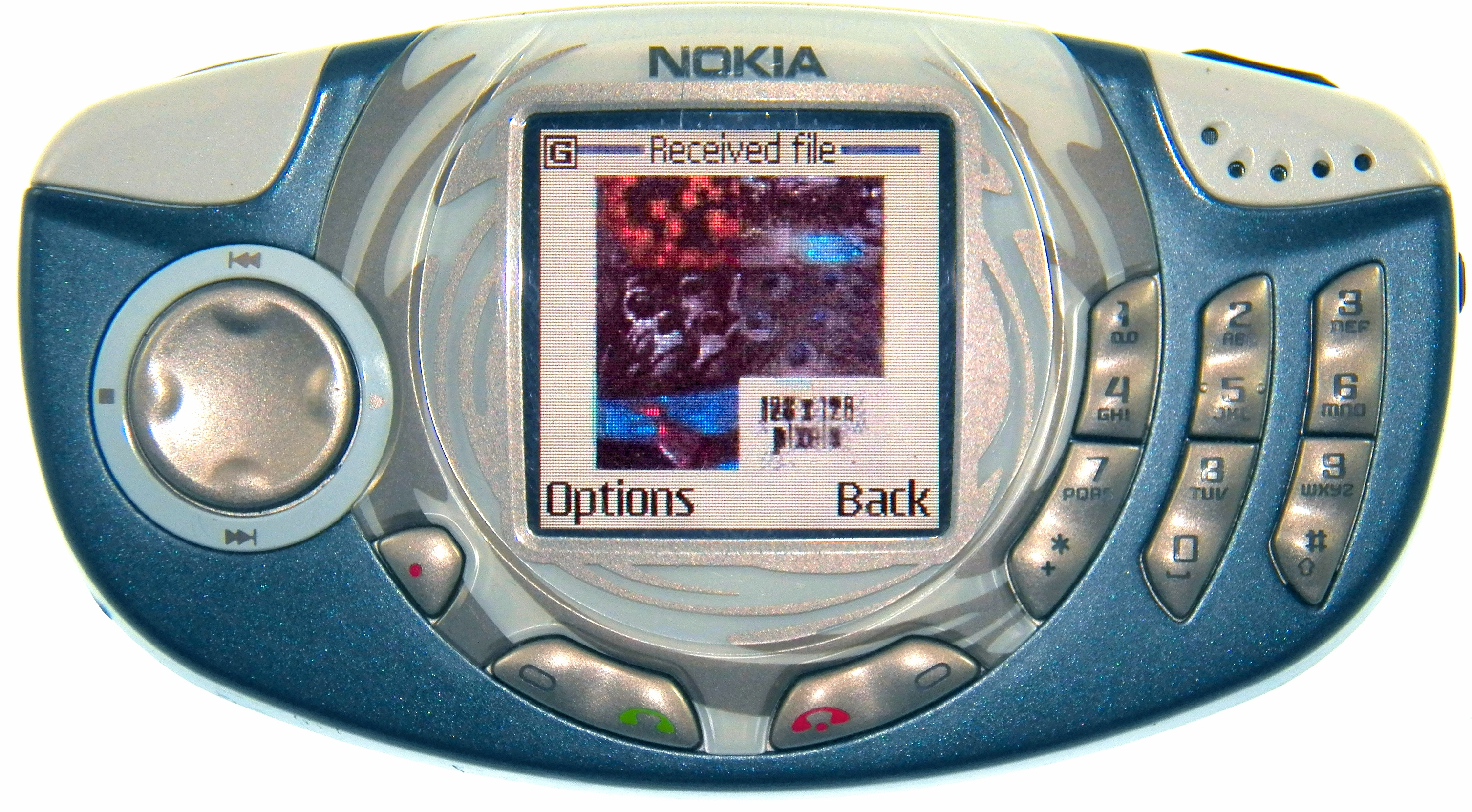
- Manufacturer: Nokia
- Predecessor: Nokia 5510 (3300/3300b)
- Successor: Nokia 7600 (3300b); Nokia 7700 (3300)
- Compatible networks: GSM 900/1800 (3300); GSM 850/1900 (3300b)
- Form factor: Monoblock
- Dimensions: 114×63×20 mm (4.49×2.48×0.79 in)
- Weight: 125 g (4 oz)
- Storage: 64MB
- Removable storage: MMC
- Battery: Li-Ion 780 mAh
- Display: 128 x 128 pixels

The Nokia 3300 is a mobile phone announced on March 11, 2003 as the successor of Nokia 5510. It was marketed primarily as a music playing phone.

== Design ==
Unlike most traditional designs, the 3300 has a display roughly in the center of the front panel with a numeric keypad to the right, a controller pad to the left and the call/end and selection keys to the bottom. The covers are interchangeable, allowing the handset to be personalised to some extent. The 3300 bears strong design similarities to the Nokia N-Gage which was introduced before it, but released long after the 3300.

Nokia also made a variant of the phone for the North American market. Compared to the Eurasian version, the 3300b utilizes a QWERTY keyboard and runs on GSM 850/1900 networks.

== Features ==
The Nokia 3300 supports MP3 and AAC audio and comes with an FM radio, and it can also be used as a digital voice recorder. Included in the standard package is a 64MB MMC memory card for storing data. GPRS data is supported, the display is a 128 x 128 pixel CSTN panel.

== See also ==
- Nokia 5510
