= Nokia 5500 Sport =

Smartphone model

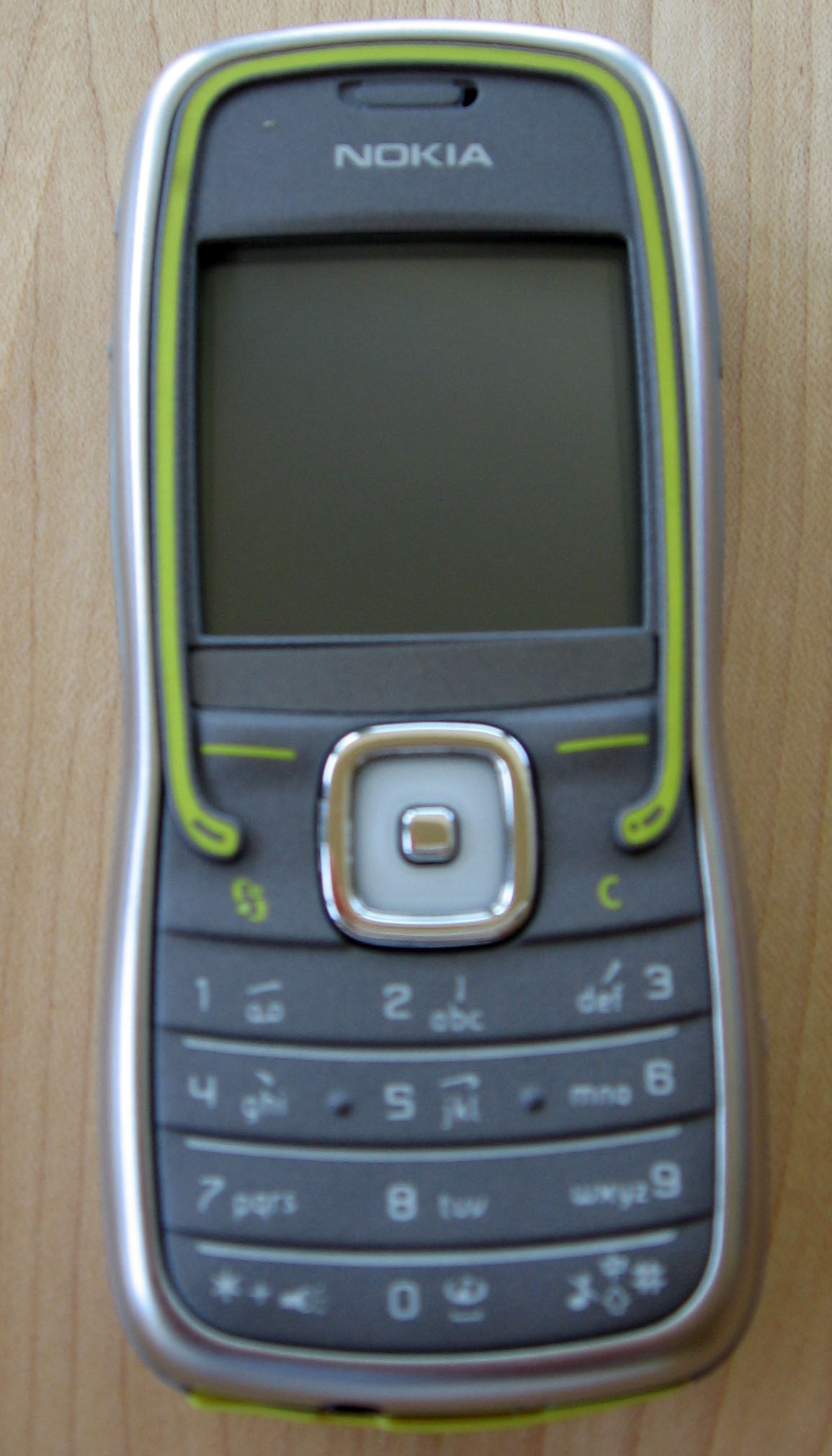
- Availability by region: Q3 2006
- Discontinued: Yes
- Predecessor: Nokia 5140
- Successor: Nokia 3720 classic
- Compatible networks: GSM 900/1800/1900 MHz
- Dimensions: 107×45×18 mm (4.21×1.77×0.71 in) (L * W * T)
- Weight: 103 g (4 oz) (including battery)
- Memory: 8 MB (internal) + MicroSD Memory Card
- Display: 31 x 31 mm / 3.1 x 3.1 cm, 18 bit 208 x 208 pixels
- Connectivity: USB Mass Storage via Pop-Port, Bluetooth 2.0, Infrared

Nokia 5500 Sport is a smartphone running Symbian v9.1 operating system and the S60 3rd Edition user interface, announced on 10 May 2006. This was the first Nokia handset ever to feature text to speech and motion sensor features.

Features include:

- Built-in 3D accelerometer: allows phone to act as pedometer/step counter.
- Swap key for quick one-key switching between phone, music, and sports modes.
- Stainless steel body: Built to resist knocks, dust and water splashes.
- Text to speech: Software to read aloud SMS and exercise data.
- Sports tracking: plans, records, and schedules workout sessions.
- Music: Unique tap commands for playing MP3 files.
- Integrated 2-megapixel camera with 4x digital zoom.

== Nokia 5500 Sport Music Edition ==
Nokia 5500 Sport Music Edition or XpressMusic announced in October 2006 is the music variant model of the Nokia 5500 Sport Model in different color scheme. Its sales package includes added accessories, such as a higher capacity memory card, bike mount and shoulder bag. Apart from that its identical hardware wise to the Nokia 5500 Sport Edition.

== Specifications sheet ==
Feature	Specification
Form factor	Bar / monoblock
Weight	103 grams (including battery)
Dimensions	107 mm x 45 mm x 18 mm (L x W x T)
Volume	77 cc
Talk time	4 hours
Standby time	270 hours (Up to 10 days)
Battery	Li-Ion BL-5B 860 mAh
Operating System	Symbian OS (9.1) + Series 60 v3
GSM frequencies	GSM 900/1800/1900 MHz
GPRS	Yes, GPRS multislot class 10, up to 62.4 kbit/s
EDGE (EGPRS)	Yes, EDGE multislot class 10, up to 236.8 kbit/s
3G	No
UMTS/WCDMA	No
WLAN/WiFi	No
Screen Size	31 x 31 mm / 3.1 x 3.1 cm
Screen Resolution	208 x 208 pixels
Flash Light Torch	Yes
Camera	2.0-megapixel, 4x digital zoom (1600 x 1200, 1152 x 864, 640 x 480 pixels)
Video recording	Yes, QCIF (176 x 144 pixels), sub-QCIF (128 x 96 pixels)
Voice recording	Yes
Text to Speech	Yes, SMS and exercise data read out loud
Multimedia Messaging	Yes
Video calls	No
Push to talk	Yes (Push to Talk over Cellular - PoC)
Java support	Yes, MIDP 2.0
Built-in memory	8 MB
Memory card slot	Yes, microSD (Expandable up to 2 GB)
Hot Swappable Memory card slot	No
Bluetooth	Yes, Bluetooth 2.0 + EDR (Enhanced Data Rate)
Infrared	Yes
USB Mass Storage class support	Yes, via Pop-Port
Data cable support	Yes
Browser	WAP 2.0 XHTML / HTML. Comes standard with a full Web browser
Email	Yes
Music player	Yes, stereo, MP3, AAC, AAC, eAAC and WMA playback support
Radio	Yes, FM Stereo with Visual Radio client
Video Player	Yes
Stereo Speakers	Yes
Ringtones	Yes, Monophonic, Polyphonic, True Tones and MP3
Vibrate	Yes
Handsfree Speaker	Yes
Offline/Flight mode	Yes
Released	Q3 2006
Synchronization	PC: Nokia PC Suite, Over the Air: SyncML

== Known issues ==
Some users have complained on the Nokia Support Discussions Board that the Nokia 5500 keypad gets unglued only after a few weeks of light usage, however later release models appear to have had this problem fixed.

== See also ==
- List of Nokia products
- Nokia Series 60
- Smartphone
- Symbian
