= Space Impact =

Mobile video game series

- Space Impact logo as used in Light, Kappa Base and Meteor Shield
- Genre: Shoot 'em up
- Developer: Various
- Publisher: Nokia
- Platforms: Mobile phone, J2ME, Symbian (S60), N-Gage Classic/QD, N-Gage 2.0
- First release: Space Impact; September 2000
- Latest release: Space Impact: Meteor Shield; 24 February 2010

Space Impact is a shoot 'em up mobile game series from Nokia. The earliest games were bundled with several of Nokia's mobile phones, whereas later titles were available for download on compatible devices. The latest instalment came in 2010.

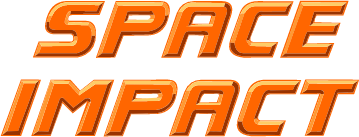
Original Space Impact logo

The first Space Impact appeared on the Nokia 3310 in 2000 and later included in various other models with a monochrome display. WAP enhanced phones gave the possibility to download extra Space Impact chapters via the WAP connection, using the Club Nokia service. Club Nokia also had a global scoreboard of all players. In 2001, a downloadable game pack from Club Nokia was also accompanied with a Flash-based web cartoon, which revolves around a plot of a Neon Force character pilot named Geneva. Later Space Impact titles had advanced graphics and capabilities and it also was released on Nokia's N-Gage 2.0 platform with online battles.

Over 150 million copies of Space Impact games were sold as a preloaded product as of 2006. More recently, various clones and remakes of the game have been made for the PC and platforms like iOS, WatchOS or Android, many of which are modeled after the original Nokia 3310 version, often with some gimmicks added.

== Gameplay ==
Gameplay of the original Space Impact, showing the player in a boss battle

Space Impact is a shoot 'em up game and the player has the ability to freely move horizontally and vertically (in the majority of its games) but cannot increase the speed of the screen's auto-scrolling feature. The player can collect power-ups throughout the levels, such as rockets and energy beams, to use as special weapons, and some pick-ups award extra lives.

In each level, the player is confronted by different enemy ships, some of which fly directly, others follow the player, and some even shoot at the player. The first game had eight levels set on different planets and underground areas, with a boss at the end of each.

In Space Impact Light, the player earns money and uses it to upgrade various parts of their spaceship, named Skyblade. Space Impact: Kappa Base, also has a plot with characters: the plot revolves around the Earth having become so polluted that humans have mechanically altered themselves into creatures named MEKS, and starts to wage war against normal unaltered humans. In this game, dodging enemy fire also rewards the player with extra firepower.

Space Impact: Meteor Shield, uses the hardware digital compass to control the ship's gun turret by rotating the phone on its vertical axis. It also makes use of the touchscreen to fend off enemies.

== Series ==
The complete series of Space Impact games is listed below; all are published by Nokia:

Title	Developer	Year	Platform	Notes
Space Impact	Nokia	2000	S40	Preloaded on Nokia 3310/3320/3360/3390, 3410, 5510, 5210, 2100, 6310, 8855. A Space Impact-themed Xpress-on cover was also released for devices including Nokia 3410.
Space Impact II	Nokia	2002	S40	Space Impact II, which debuted on Nokia 3510 and later appeared in Nokia's CDMA models. Identical gameplay to the original, with new levels and enemies as well as optional background music in some versions.
Space Impact +	Nokia	2003		Included in Nokia 1100 and Nokia 2300. Features platform-style levels.
Space Impact 303	Nokia	c. 2003	J2ME	Not preloaded but downloadable as a Java applet from the Nokia website, redesigned gameplay layout for 128 x 128 color screen devices: Nokia 7210, 3220, 3100, 6100, 6610/6610i. A version for 176 x 208 display devices was also available, such as for Nokia 3650, 6600 and 6630.
Space Impact Evolution	Kuju Entertainment	c. 2003	S60v1	Designed for Nokia 7650, first version in vertical gameplay form.
Space Impact Evolution X	Kuju Entertainment	2003	N-Gage, S60v2	Bundled exclusively with the N-Gage as a .SIS file on the CD-ROM. Physical copies were made for pre-launch testing purposes.
Space Impact Light	Method Solutions	2007	S60v3	Originally announced for N-Gage 2.0 in 2006 as Space Impact repackaged as 'light'. A demo also came bundled with the Nokia N81 8GB released in October 2007 as part of the N-Gage 2.0 preview.
Space Impact: Kappa Base	Method Solutions	2008	N-Gage 2.0	Included online multiplayer capability. Using N-Gage Arena, players would challenge different levels and upload their high scores to the public.
Space Impact: Meteor Shield	Rovio	2010	S60v5	Distributed on the Ovi Store and released for Nokia N97, taking advantage of the phone's digital compass. First game in the series set in a 3D environment.

== Reception ==
The original Space Impact is well remembered as one of the games of the popular Nokia 3310 handset. In 2010, CNET put it in its top 10 'greatest mobile games of all time', and said that it pushed the boundaries in what was possible on a mobile device.

Space Impact: Kappa Base on N-Gage 2.0, in a Pocket Gamer review, was given 8 out of 10 by Stuart Dredge. He thought that the game was very difficult, but after the learning curve becomes "rewarding". It was also given Pocket Gamer's Silver Award.

== See also ==
- Shoot 'em up
- Snake
- Bounce
- N-Gage
- Angry Birds
