= Nokia 6210 =

Mobile phone

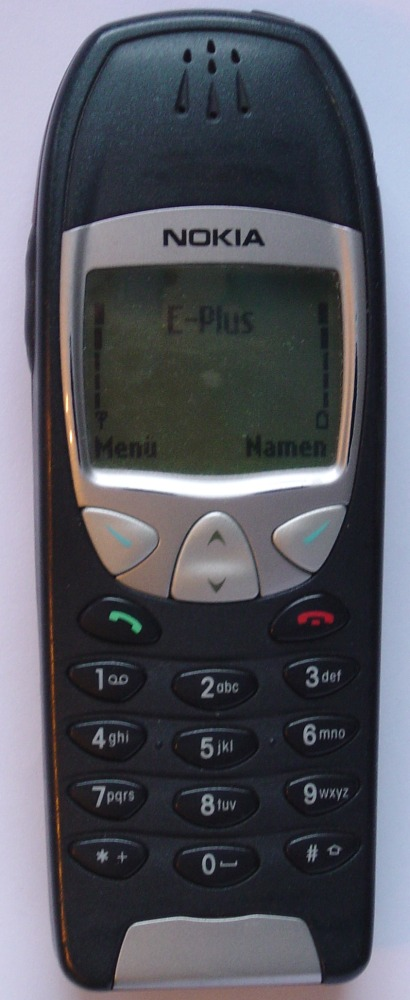
- Idle screen on a Nokia 6210
- Manufacturer: Nokia
- First released: September 2000
- Predecessor: Nokia 6150
- Successor: Nokia 6310
- Related: Nokia 6250
- Form factor: Candybar
- Dimensions: 130×47×19 mm (5.12×1.85×0.75 in)
- Weight: 114 g (4 oz)
- Operating system: Series 20 UI
- Display: 95 x 60 pixels, Monochrome LCD
- Made in: Finland

The Nokia 6210 is a GSM mobile phone made by Nokia. It was introduced at the CeBIT fair in Hanover in February 2000, targeting mobile "professionals" and succeeding the Nokia 6110, and began shipping on 7 September 2000. In addition to calling and SMS messaging, it has many other features, including an alarm clock, HSCSD modem, WAP web client, three games (Snake 2, Pairs II and Opposite), calculator, to-do list, calendar, infrared connectivity, voice recorder, and stopwatch. The plastic detail below the keypad, which Nokia called the Personal Badge, is removable; for a time, Nokia sent free promotional replacements, screen-printed with text of the customer's choosing. At launch, the 6210 was plagued by a number of software bugs.

== Bluetooth functionality ==
The 6210 could have Bluetooth functionality added via the Nokia Connectivity Pack, which included a replacement battery incorporating a Bluetooth adaptor and antenna, interfacing with the phone via normally unused electrical contacts in the battery compartment and a connectivity card with a PCMCIA adaptor, for Bluetooth connections to a portable computer. In December 2000, Bluetooth was not yet widespread. Connectivity batteries were available separately. The pack also allowed the 6210 to be turned into a GSM modem for use with a laptop up to 10 metres away (handier than using infrared) for Internet access with speeds of up to 43.2 kbps through HSCSD and multiple time slots.

A software upgrade was required for existing 6210 owners. In this way, upgraded 6210s were the earliest cellular phones with Bluetooth connectivity. The upgrade pack was ready several months before the launch of the first phones with built-in Bluetooth but was not released until sometime after that launch.

== Popular culture ==
Speaking in 2014, human-rights activist and former punk rock star Bob Geldof said that he still used a Nokia 6210, 14 years after its release. Citing its robust nature, he referred to it as "the AK-47 of mobile phones."

== Nokia 6210e ==
There was a special version of the 6210 specific to Orange, named the 6210e, released also in 2000, only sold in grey. The Personal Badge always had the Orange logo on it, with the model name of the phone. There is no hardware difference whatsoever.

== See also ==
- List of Nokia products
- Nokia 6210 Navigator
