= Nokia 2600 =

2004 cell phone model

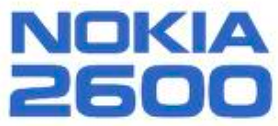

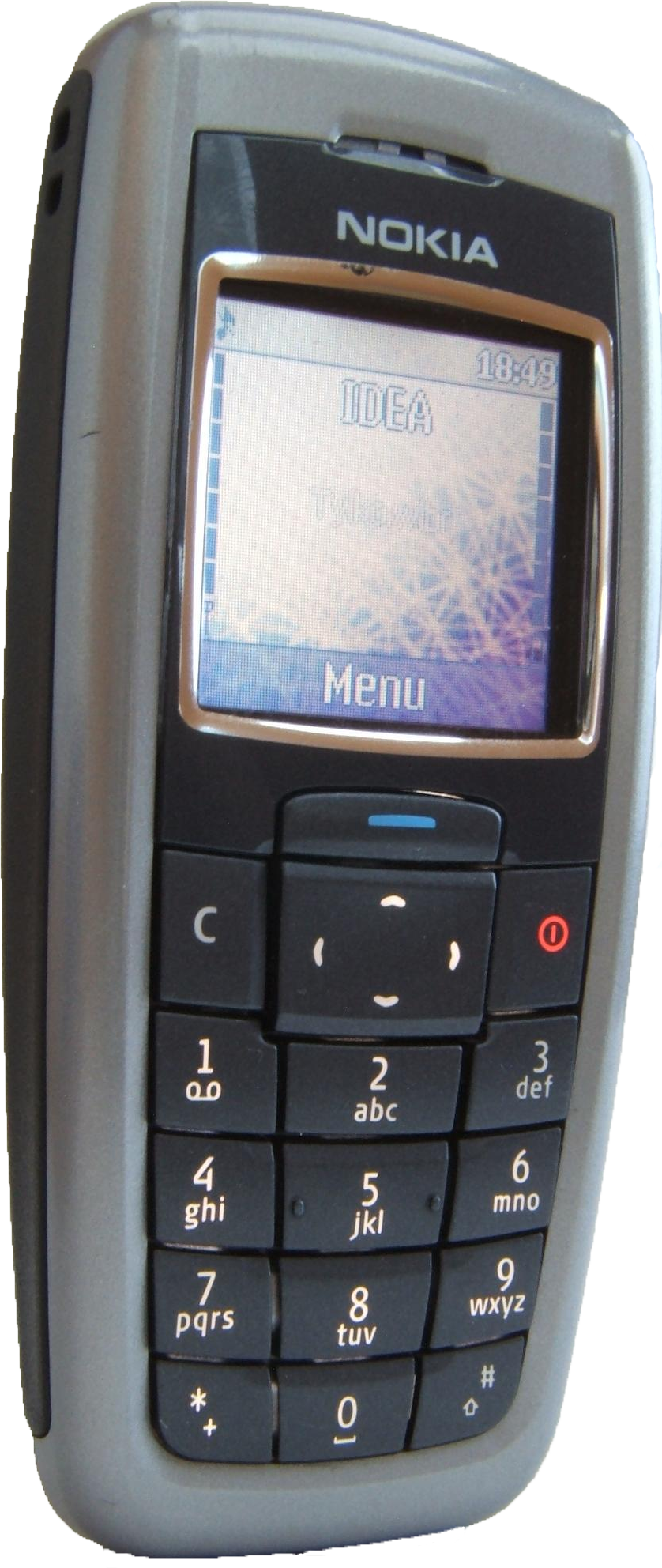
- Manufacturer: Nokia
- Availability by region: Q2 2004
- Predecessor: Nokia 2300
- Successor: Nokia 1650
- Related: Nokia 2600 classic
- Form factor: Candybar
- Dimensions: 108×46×201 mm (4.3×1.8×7.9 in), 80 cc
- Weight: 96 g (3 oz)
- Operating system: Series 30
- Removable storage: No
- Battery: Nokia BL-5C; Li-Ion 850 mAh
- Rear camera: No
- Front camera: No
- Display: 128 x 128 pixels

The Nokia 2600 is an entry-level mobile phone by Nokia. It was announced first in April 2004 in Asia, and at the Nokia Connection Conference in Singapore and Helsinki on 14 June 2004. The 2600, along with the 2650 flip phone announced along with it, brought colour displays and polyphonic ringtones for the first time to the Nokia entry-level offerings.

It was marketed as an easy-to-use phone running Series 30 with a 128x128 colour display and lacking a camera, Bluetooth or a radio. It sold 135 million units, being one of the best selling phones to date. The 2600 comes preloaded with the Bounce, Mobile Soccer and Nature Park games. (Some models included the game Millennium Mission instead of Nature Park.) It also has a spreadsheet functionality despite lacking second functional button and its low resolution display.

== See also ==
- List of Nokia products
