= JGR Class 7010 =

Japanese 0-6-0 type steam locomotive class

Class 7010
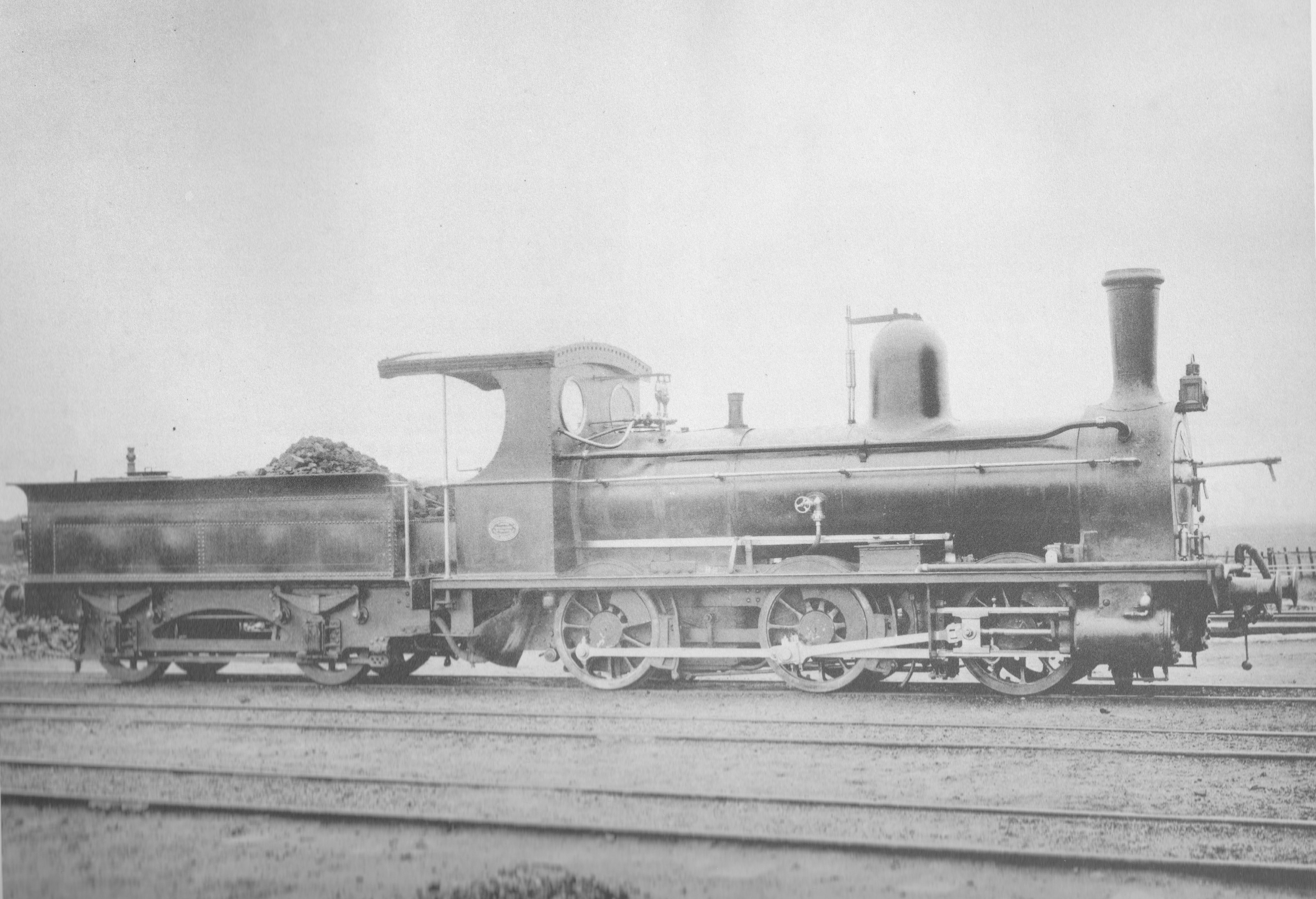
- JGR 7010 steam locomotive
Type and origin
- Power type: Steam
Specifications
- Configuration
  - Whyte: 0-6-0
- Gauge: 1,067 mm (3 ft 6 in)
- Driver dia.: 1,092 mm (3 ft 7.0 in)

The JGR Class 7010 (7010形) is a 0-6-0 steam locomotive formerly operated in Japan by Japanese Government Railways.

== Specifications ==
The driving wheel diameter was 1,092 millimetres (3 ft 7.0 in) and the tender has two axles. The valve gear is an Allan type with Salter safety valves on a domed boiler. It originally had a rapid ejection (pop) safety valves and the locomotive itself had no brakes, those being only on the tender.

This class was little changed compared to the 2-4-0 tank locomotive imported at the same time, aside from having brakes on the locomotive body and an improved safety valve. Some engines were given larger cylinders.

== See also ==
- Japan Railways locomotive numbering and classification
