= Nokia 5140 =

Mobile phone model

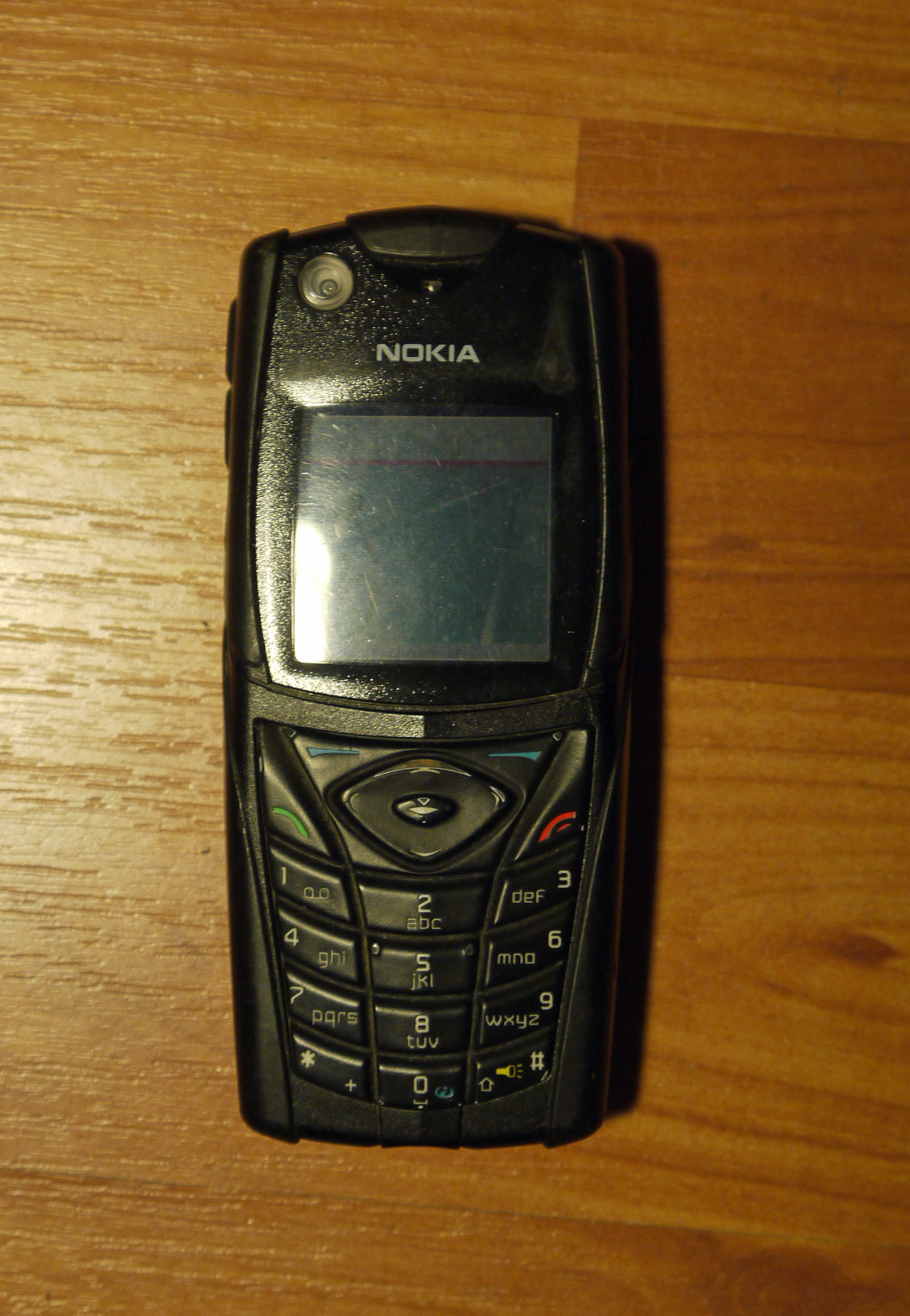
- Manufacturer: Nokia
- Availability by region: Q1 2004
- Discontinued: 2007
- Predecessor: Nokia 5100
- Successor: Nokia 5500 Sport
- Compatible networks: GSM 900 1800
- Connectivity: Infrared
- Data inputs: Keypad

The Nokia 5140 is a mobile phone manufactured by Nokia. Released in 2003, it has a white backlit screen, FM radio, VGA display, and a USB pop-port operating on the GSM Network. The Nokia 5140 was the successor to the Nokia 5100, but has since been discontinued.

The 5140 and 5140i were Nokia's first phones that could be NFC-enabled, via NFC shells that could be attached to the phones.
