= Nokia 3310 =

GSM mobile phone by Nokia

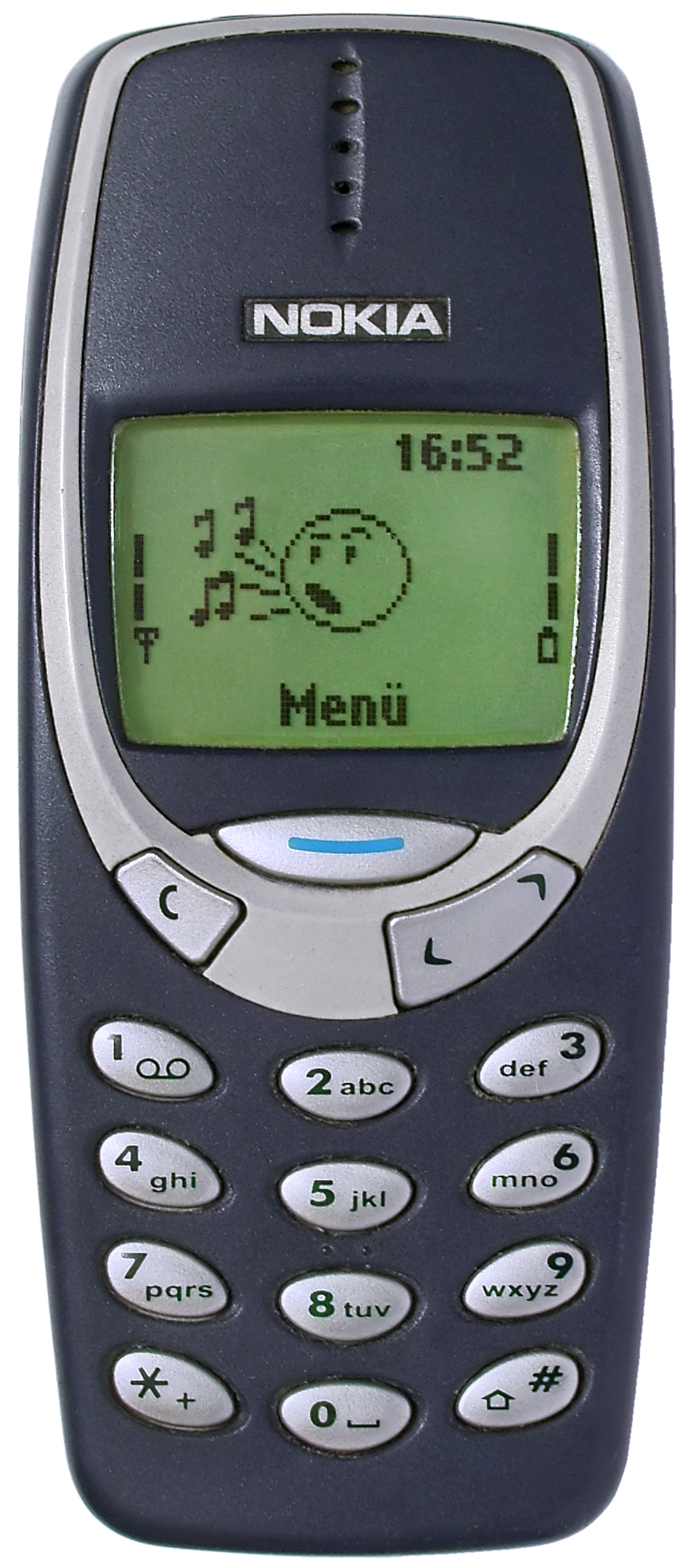
- A Nokia 3310 in Blue with the menu displayed in German language
- Manufacturer: Nokia
- Type: Mobile phone
- Series: Nokia 3000 series
- First released: 1 September 2000; 26 years ago (3310); 2002 (3315, 3360, 3395)
- Discontinued: December 2005
- Units sold: 126 million
- Predecessor: Nokia 3210 (3310); Nokia 5110 (3310); Nokia 5110i (3315); Nokia 5120 (3320); Nokia 5125 (3321); Nokia 5130 NK402 (3330); Nokia 5160 (3360); Nokia 5165 (3361); Nokia 5170 (3350); Nokia 5190 (3390 and 3395)
- Successor: Nokia 3410 (3310 and 3315); Nokia 3510 (3310); Nokia 3510i (3330); Nokia 3530 (3350); Nokia 3560 (3360); Nokia 3590 (3390); Nokia 3595 (3395); Nokia 2220 (3320); Nokia 2260 (3360); Nokia 2300 (3315); Nokia 2600 (3310); Nokia 1100 (3310 and 3315); Nokia 3310 (2017) (revival); Nokia 800 Tough (spiritual)
- Related: List of Nokia products
- Compatible networks: GSM (3310, 3315, 3350, 3390, and 3395); TDMA (3320 and 3360)
- Form factor: Candy bar
- Dimensions: 113 mm × 48 mm × 22 mm (4.45 in × 1.89 in × 0.87 in)
- Weight: 133 g (4.7 oz)
- Operating system: Series 20
- CPU: Texas Instruments MAD2WD1 (based on ARM7TDMI)
- Memory: Built-in 1.5 KB
- Battery: Removable; BMC-3 (NiMH) 900 mAh, or BLC-2 (Li-ion) 1000 mAh
- Display: 1.5-inch backlit monochrome graphic LCD; 84x48 px, 64 ppi, 5 lines
- Sound: Monophonic ringtones
- Data inputs: Alphanumeric keypad
- SAR: 0.96 W/kg (head)
- Made in: Finland: Espoo; Germany: Bochum; South Korea: Masan (3390, 3315 and 3310 for Asia-Pacific Market); Hungary: Komárom; Brazil: Manaus (Gradiente)

The Nokia 3310 is a discontinued GSM mobile phone by Nokia. It was announced on the 1st of September 2000, and released in the fourth quarter of the year, replacing the popular Nokia 3210. It is one of the most successful phones ever made, with 126 million units sold worldwide, and being one of Nokia's most iconic devices. The phone is still widely acclaimed and has gained a cult status due to its reputation for durability and long battery life. The phone was stopped from mass production in December 2005, being one of the longest-produced Nokia model to date, with remaining stock being sold by spring 2006.

The Nokia 3310 was produced at factories in Finland and Hungary. Several variants of the 3310 have been released, including the Nokia 3315, 3320, 3330, 3350, 3360, 3390 and 3395. The 3315s were produced in South Korea for the Asia-Pacific market.

The phone was succeeded by the Nokia 3410 and Nokia 3510. A new mobile phone based on the 3310 design was launched in 2017; this new Nokia 3310 model comes with a comprehensive update over its predecessor, with a 2.4" color display, a 2 Megapixel rear camera, and a microSD slot.

== Design ==
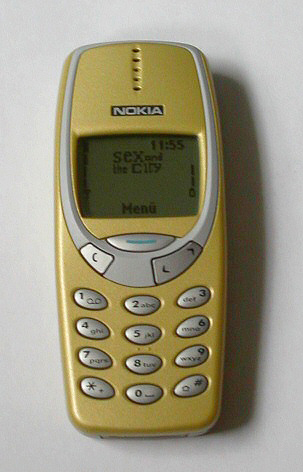
Nokia 3310 with an official "Sahara Yellow" color Xpress-on cover

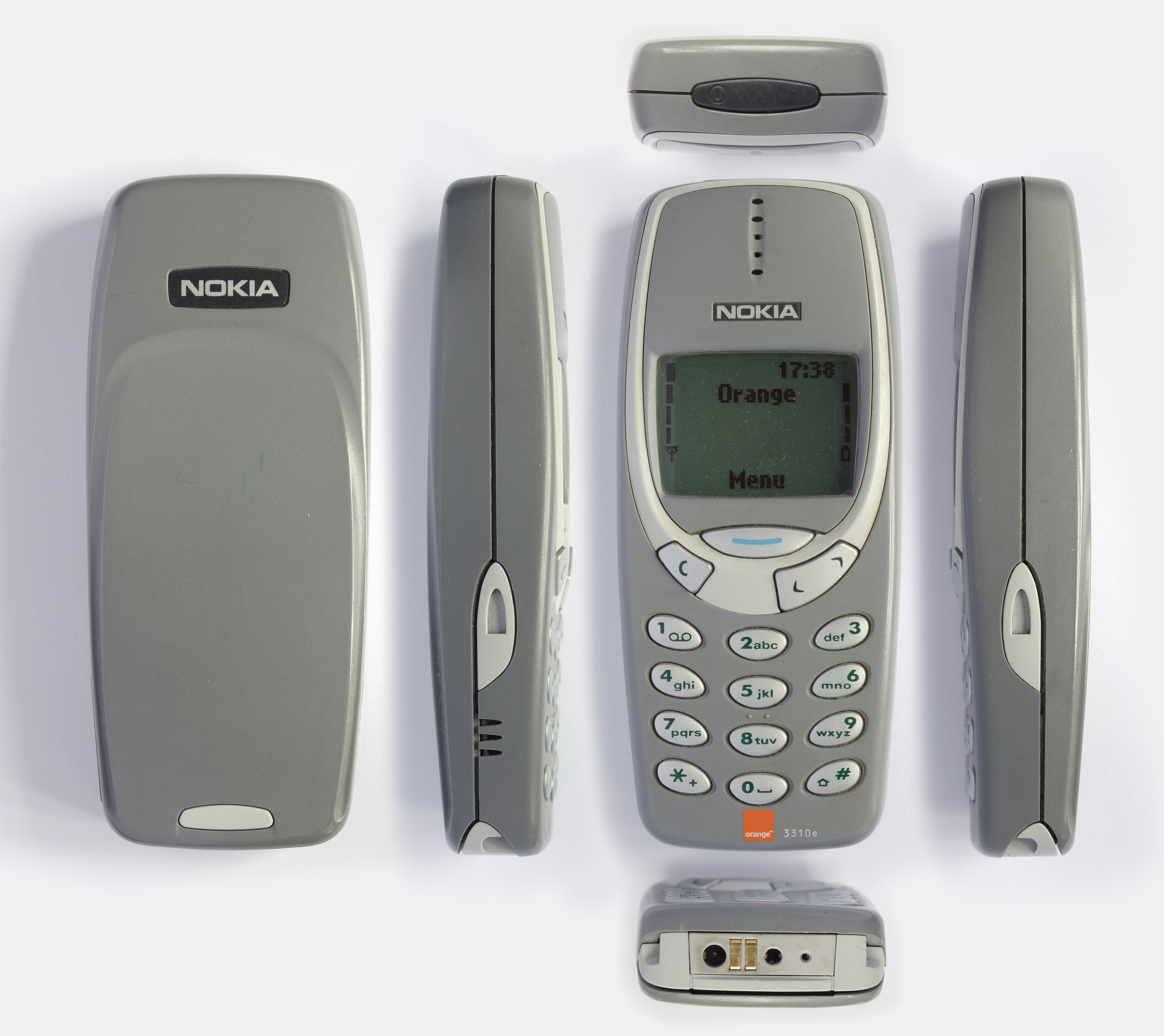
A grey, Orange-branded 3310 seen from multiple angles

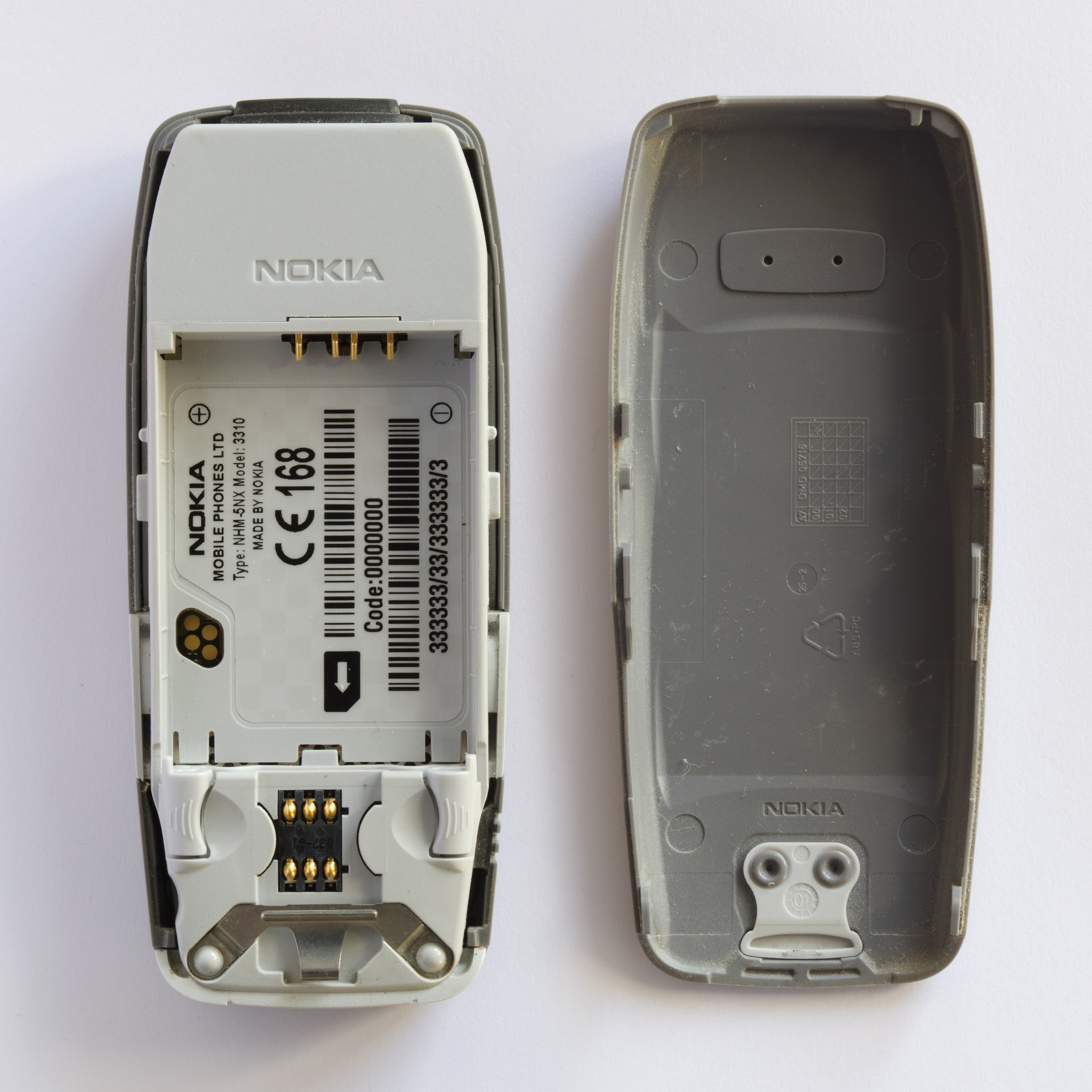
Inside a Nokia 3310 with the battery removed

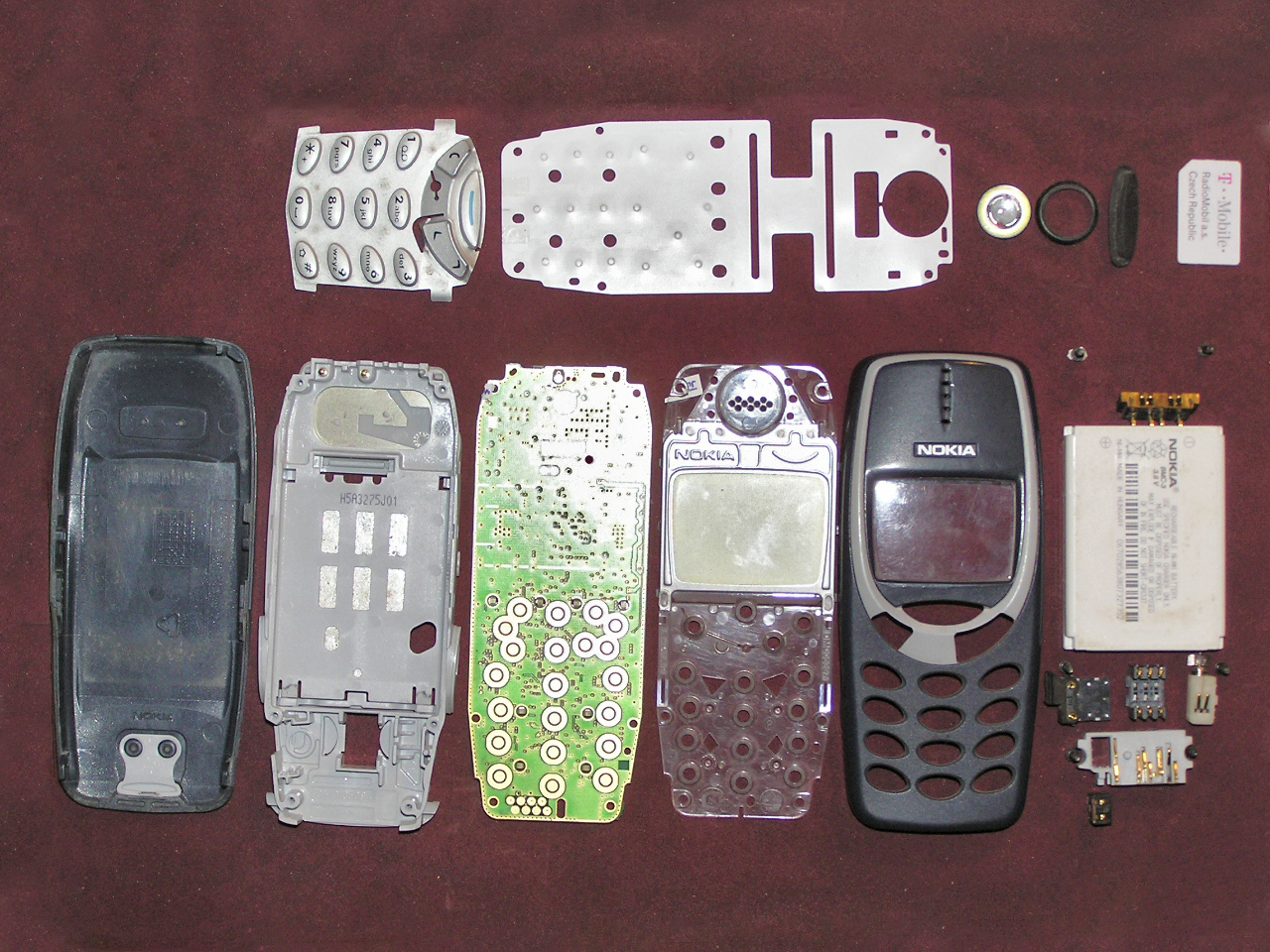
A disassembled Nokia 3310 showing various internal components

The 3310 was developed at the Copenhagen Nokia site in Denmark and unveiled at the "Don't be bored. Be totally board." lifestyle event in Oberhausen, Germany, as well as "Nokia Unplugged" concerts in the Asia-Pacific region. It is a compact and sturdy phone featuring an 84 × 48 pixel pure monochrome display. It has a lighter removable 115 g (4.1 oz) battery variant which has fewer features; for example, the 133 g (4.6 oz) battery version has a start-up image of two hands touching while the 115 g (4.1 oz) version does not. It is a slightly rounded rectangular unit that is typically held in the palm of a hand, with the buttons operated with the thumb. The blue button is the main button for selecting options, with the "C" button as a "backspace", "back" or "undo" button. Up and down buttons are used for navigation purposes. The on/off/profile button is a stiff black button located on the top of the phone. Like its predecessor Nokia 3210, the 3310 was marketed as a customizable consumer-oriented handset targeting the youth. It is about a centimeter shorter than the 3210.

The 3310 has durable casing and construction, which is often humorously exaggerated in online communities as "indestructible". Numerous videos exist of the phone being put through increasingly-severe tests of the phone's strength, including being dropped from a great height (sometimes protected by makeshift cases made from various objects), being crushed by heavy objects or being struck by vehicles or hammers. The 3310's reputation for durability led HMD Global to develop the Nokia 800 Tough with MIL-STD-810G standard compliance in mind.

== Features ==
The Nokia 3310's main new feature introduced over its predecessors was a Chat function. This is an instant messaging-like feature that works on standard SMS. The 3310 was popular for SMS text messaging because of Chat and also because it allowed long messages three times the size of a standard SMS text message, at 459 characters. It also featured threaded SMS writing and voice dialing for the quick dialing of selected numbers.

The 3310 is known for having many features that were rare for the time. These include many utilities, such as a calculator, Nokia network monitor, stop watch and a reminder function. It has four games: Pairs II (a video game version of Concentration), Space Impact, Bantumi (a video game version of Kalah), and the hugely popular Snake II. The Snake series of games has been popular on Nokia handsets since the late 1990s. CNET remembered Space Impact, a shoot 'em up in which the player fires projectiles at oncoming aliens, as a mediocre game overall but impressive for fitting a mobile device with its complexity and length. It was later recreated for other mobile devices.

The Nokia 3310 runs on Nokia's proprietary Series 20 software.

The Nokia 3310 uses a MiniSIM (more commonly known as a standard SIM).

== Customization ==
The Nokia 3310 can be customized with interchangeable Xpress-On covers, and thousands of different designs have been produced by various companies. It also has over 35 ringtones built-in with space for seven custom tones. These can either be downloaded, or composed by the user on the handset. The phone has various "profiles" that can set several preferences such as silent mode where the phone will not ring, useful for situations where it is inappropriate to do so. Screensavers can be made from received picture messages.

== Variants ==
=== 3315, 3390 and 3395 ===
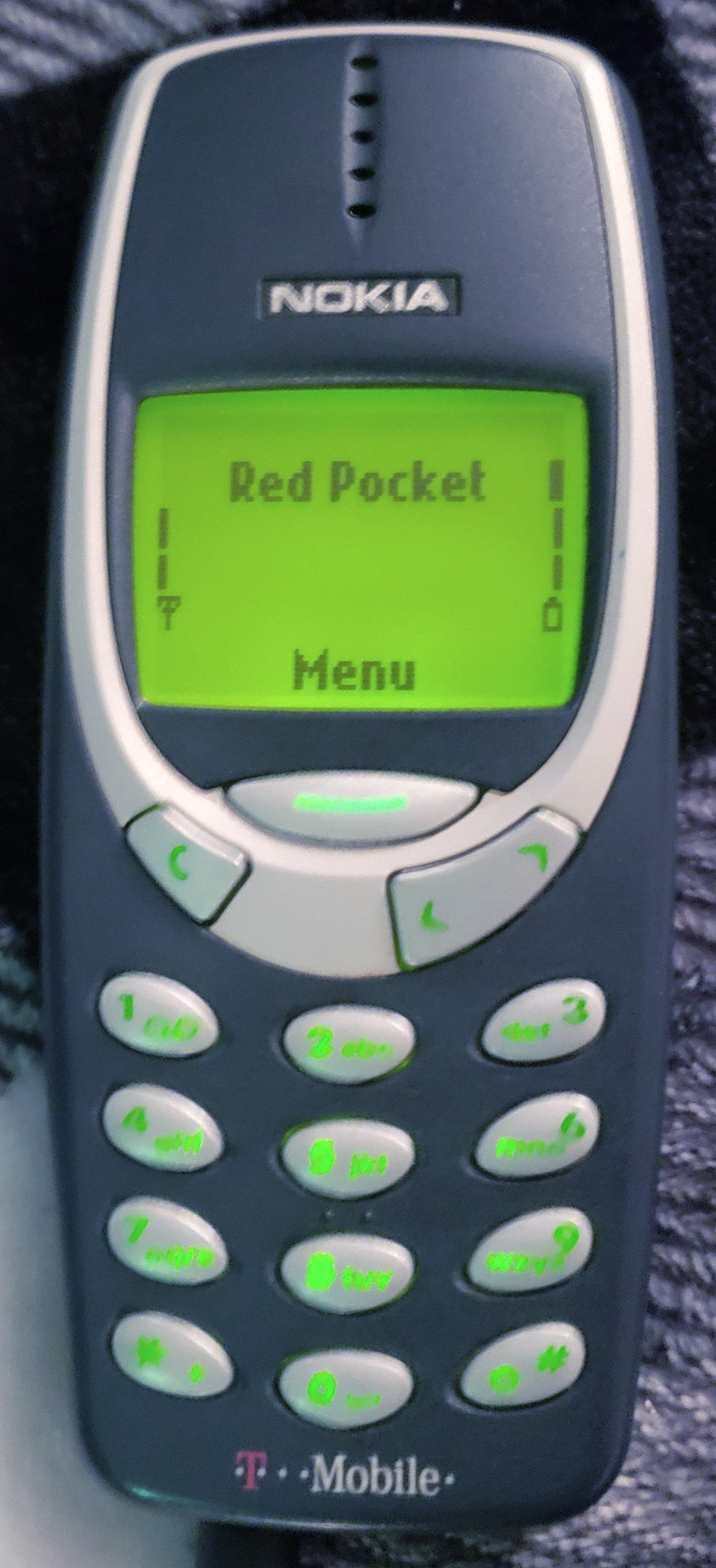
Nokia 3390

An enhanced version of the 3310 is the Nokia 3315, which has some additional features:

- A picture editor to edit pictures for use in SMS Picture messaging and screensavers on the phone
- Timed profiles
- Could use self-made and received ringtones as SMS tones
- Fixed some of the bugs found in the 3310
- Automatic keypad locking after a specified time
- Accidental emergency calls are not possible because keyguard is always "on"
- Peanut-like interconnected silicon key mat

3315s sold in Singapore and Malaysia had a blue backlight for the LCD screen and keypad, as opposed to green in other markets.

The 3315 was also released in Australia. Most versions of the 3310 could be upgraded to include the additional features of the 3315 by using a data cable.

There are two North American variants of the 3310; one is the Nokia 3390, which operates on GSM 1900. The Nokia 3395 is an updated version of the 3390, which includes the additional features of the Asian 3315 model, and it has poor reception if connected to a GSM 850 area.

=== WAP-enhanced models (3330 and 3350) ===
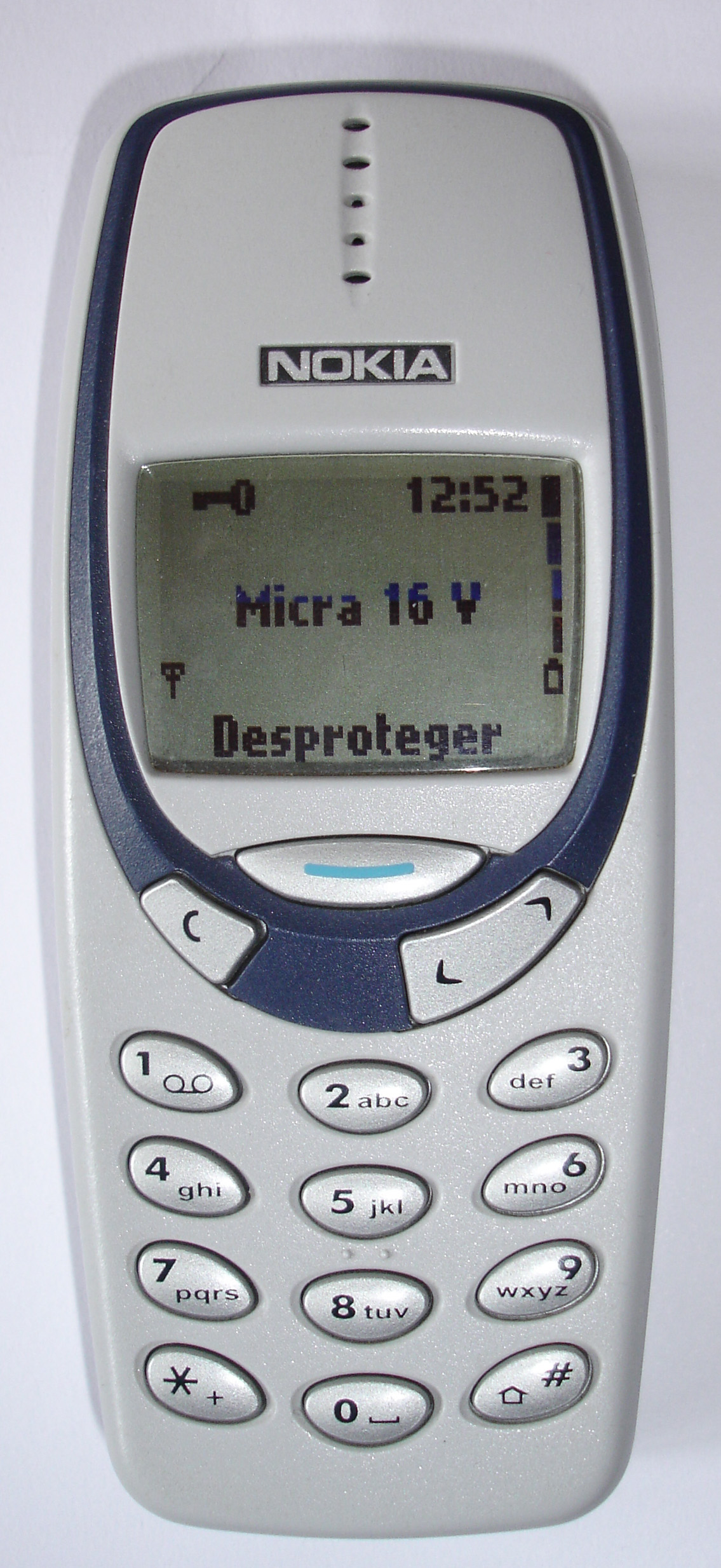
Nokia 3330, a variant of Nokia 3310

The Nokia 3330 added a CSD-based WAP capability, animated Screensavers, a pinball game named Bumper, and phonebook (stored in the phone memory as opposed to the SIM card in earlier models) with a 100-entry capacity to the model. It also has the capability of downloading additional game content via WAP (such as Snake II mazes, Bumper tables, and Space Impact chapters).

An Asia-Pacific only version, known as the Nokia 3350, was, in essence, an improved 3330 with WAP, rhythmic backlight alert, animated Screensavers, two-way Navi-Key, dedicated call and hang buttons, Chinese lunar calendar, and a 96-by-65-pixel screen. Some 3350s have back covers that feature a photo-insert window, allowing users to put personal pictures from photographs, magazine cut-outs, etc.

=== AMPS/D-AMPS-based versions (3320 and 3360) ===
The Nokia 3360 and 3320 are related models designed for the U.S. and Canadian markets, respectively. They are externally similar to the 3310 and 3390, but they use Digital AMPS ("TDMA")/AMPS technology rather than GSM.

Like the Asian 3350, they include two dedicated call and hang buttons and two soft keys. They also feature an infrared port. Unlike the 3390, the 3360 and 3320 do not support voice dialing. At 136 grams each, they are also slightly heavier than the 3390, which weighs 119 grams.

== Legacy ==
The Nokia 3310 has a reputation of great durability, and many Internet memes have been made calling the phone "indestructible" or "the Nokia Brick" and praising its durability compared to modern smartphones. In a retrospective piece, TechRepublic called the Nokia 3310 "a big tough cockroach of a phone" and praised its "legendary durability".

In November 2015, the Nokia 3310 was chosen as one of the first three "National Emojis" for Finland. The emoji is referred to as "The Unbreakable", as the phone was known for its aforementioned toughness and durability.

== Revival ==
On 14 February 2017, it was reported that a revived version of the 3310 would be unveiled at the 2017 Mobile World Congress in Barcelona by HMD Global Oy, the Finnish manufacturer with rights to market phones under the Nokia brand, forecasting a price point of €49. On 26 February 2017, the modernized version of the 3310 was launched at a price of €49.
