= 2600 series =

2600 series may refer to the following:

- 2600 series (Chicago "L"), a train operated in the USA
- JR Shikoku 2600 series, a train operated in Japan
- Keihan 2600 series electric multiple unit
- Odakyu 2600 series electric multiple unit
