= Nokia 5100 =

Mobile phone model

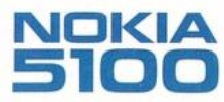

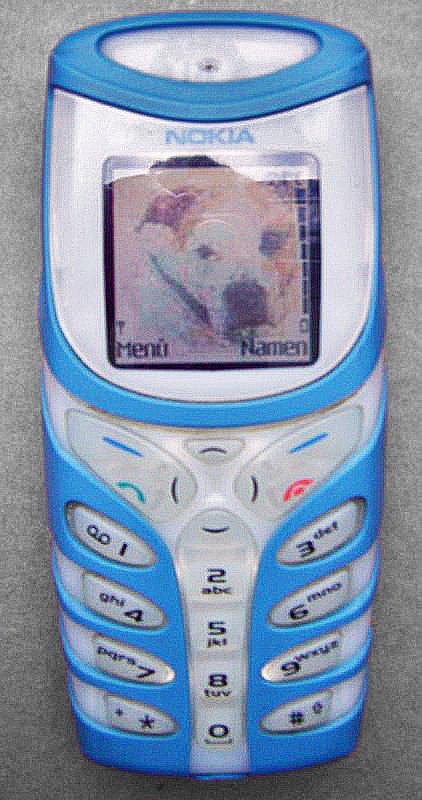
- Manufacturer: Nokia
- Availability by region: 2003
- Predecessor: Nokia 5210
- Successor: Nokia 5140
- Compatible networks: EGSM 900 GSM 1800/1900 (Tri band)
- Form factor: Candybar
- Dimensions: 49.5×108.5×22 mm (1.95×4.27×0.87 in)
- Weight: 104 g (4 oz)
- Battery: BL-4C (3.7 volts) 720 mAh, Li-ion
- Display: 128 x 128 pixel 4096 colors
- Connectivity: infrared (IrDA)
- Data inputs: Keypad

Nokia 5100 is a Nokia GSM mobile phone model that was announced on 4 November 2002 and released in early 2003.

It was marketed as an outdoor device, hence it is in a rubber casing that provides protection against humidity, shocks and dust. It has some special functions like thermometer, flashlight, calorie counter and loudness meter (dB). It also has a stereo FM radio built in and is Tri-Band with up to 300 hours standby time.

The model type is NPM-6 and it is available in light blue (picture), dark grey, green and orange. It has Xpress-on shells which can be changed.

== See also ==
- List of Nokia products
