= JGR Class 5100 =

Japanese steam locomotive type

Class 5100
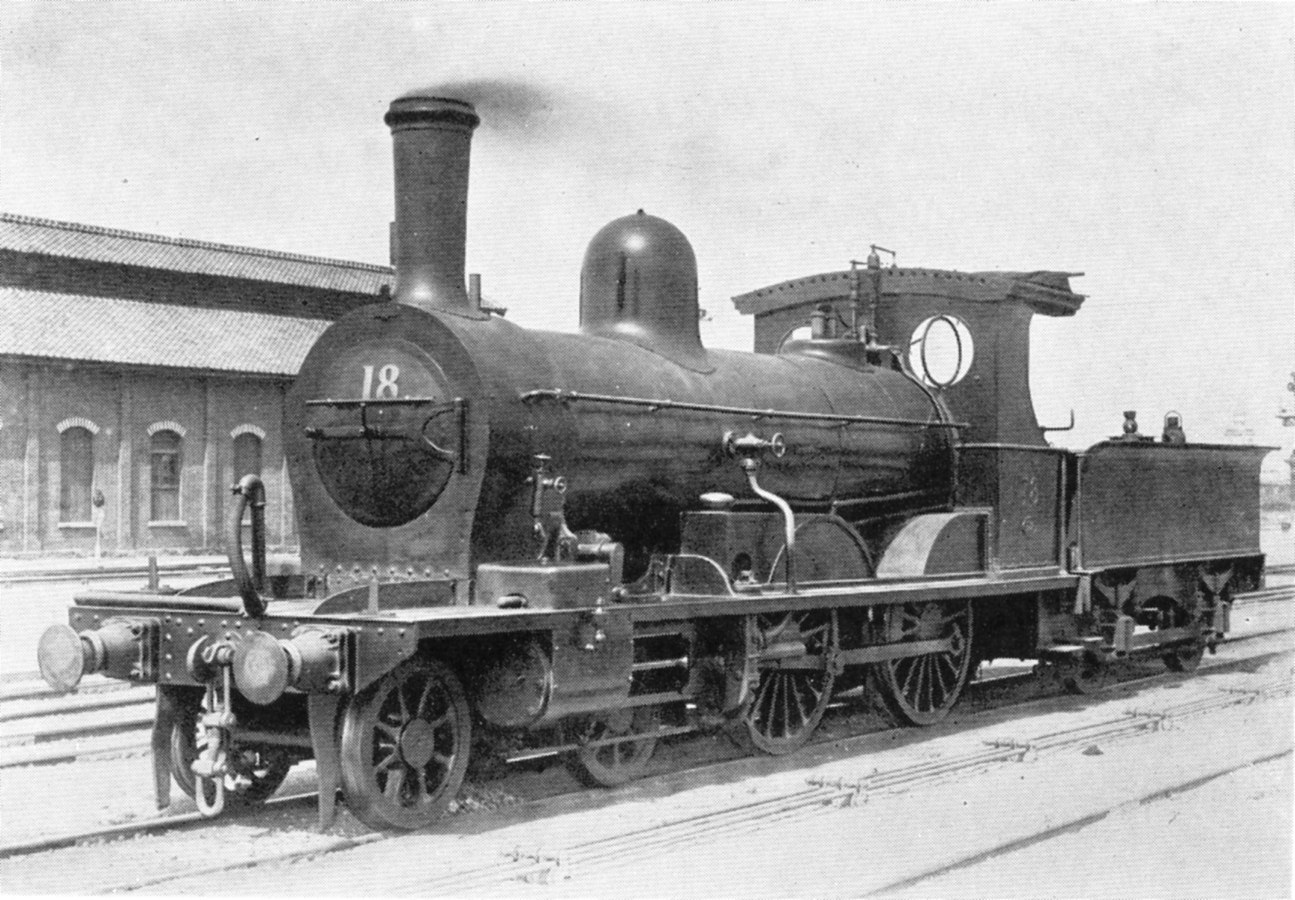
- Locomotive No. 18 before being classified Class 5100
Type and origin
- Power type: Steam
- Builder: Kitson and Company
- Build date: 1874
- Total produced: 4
- Rebuilder: Kobe
- Rebuild date: 1876
- Number rebuilt: 2
Specifications
- Configuration
  - Whyte: 4-4-0
- Gauge: 1,067 mm (3 ft 6 in)
- Leading dia.: 813 mm (2 ft 8.0 in)
- Driver dia.: 1.372 m (4 ft 6.0 in)
- Wheelbase: 5.435 m (17 ft 10.0 in)
- Length: 13.115 m (43 ft 0.3 in)
- Loco weight: 26 t
- Firebox
  - Grate area: 1.1 m^{2} (12 sq ft)
- Boiler pressure: 9.5 kg/cm^{2} (135 lbf/in^{2})
- Heating surface: 75.9 m^{2} (817 sq ft)
- Cylinders: Two
- Cylinder size: 35.6 cm × 50.8 cm (14 in × 20 in)

The JGR Class 5100 (5100形) was a type of 4-4-0 steam locomotive used on Japanese Government Railways. The two locomotives, numbered 18 and 20, were built by Kitson and Company in the United Kingdom in 1874 as 0-6-0 locomotives of the later JGR Class 7010. They were rebuilt into 4-4-0 wheel arrangement passenger locomotives at Kobe in 1876. In 1909, the two locomotives were classified Class 5100, becoming numbers 5100 and 5101.

== See also ==
- Japan Railways locomotive numbering and classification
