= Nokia 2300 =

2003 mobile phone

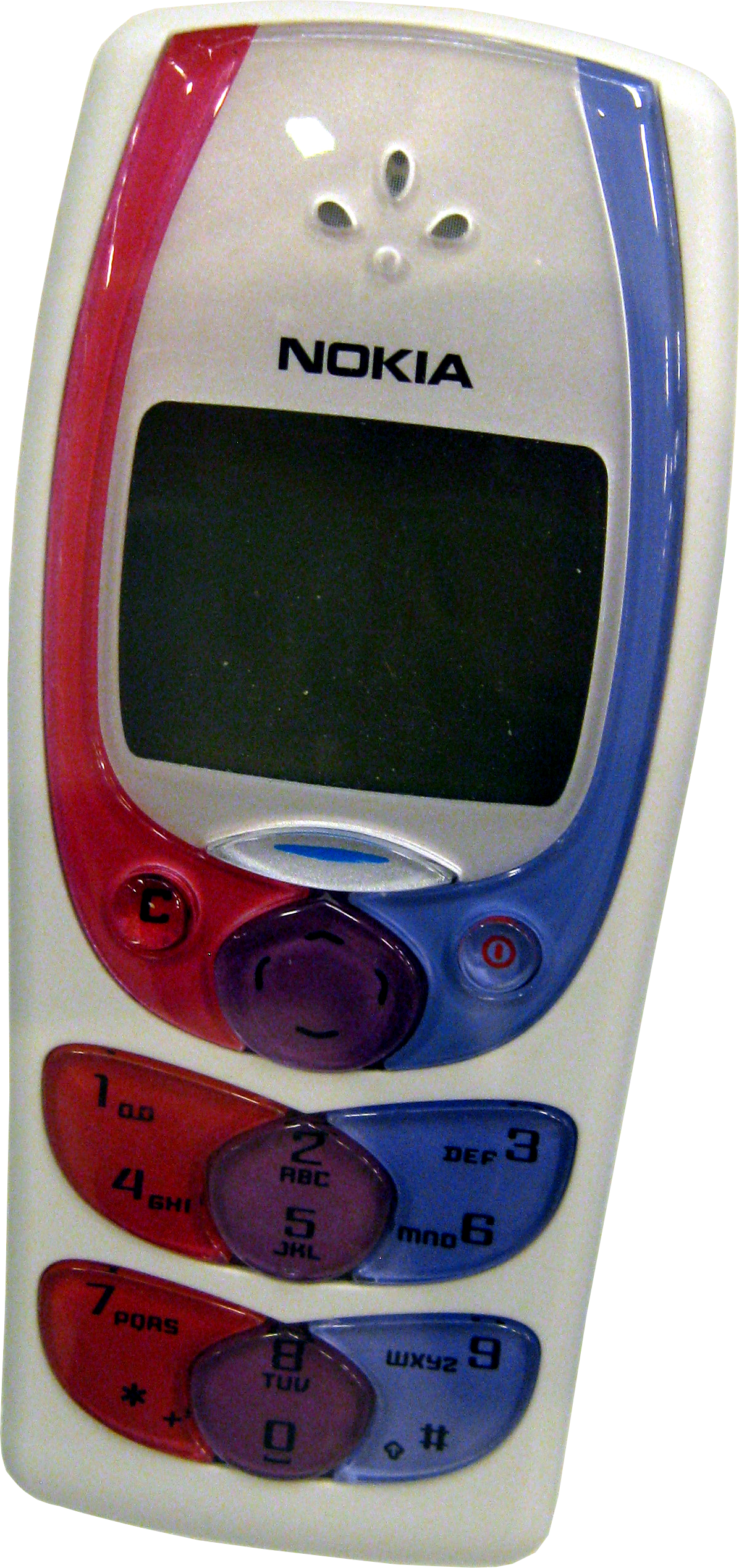
- Manufacturer: Nokia
- First released: November 2003
- Availability by region: January 2004
- Discontinued: Q4 2007/Q1 2008
- Related: Nokia 1100
- Dimensions: 107 mm (4.2 in) H 46 mm (1.8 in) W 20 mm (0.79 in) D
- Weight: 92 g (3 oz)
- Operating system: Series 30
- Display: 1.35 in (34 mm) diagonal STN LCD; 96 × 65 pixels

The Nokia 2300 is an entry-level GSM mobile phone announced on 27 August 2003, and was released later that year. It was rare in sales, compared to other basic models, like 1100 and 1110.

Part of the 2xxx basic series, it has features like an alarm clock, a calculator, and an FM radio. It has a 1.8-inch monochrome display in 96x65 pixels resolution, backlit in white, and has a playback of polyphonic ringtones. The phone was targeted mainly at young people and had interchangeable Xpress-On covers in many colors. It comes with three pre-loaded games, Snake II, Space Impact and Opposite.

The 2300 was discontinued in late 2007.

== See also ==
List of Nokia products
