= Nokia 3410 =

Mobile phone by Nokia

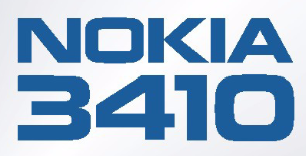

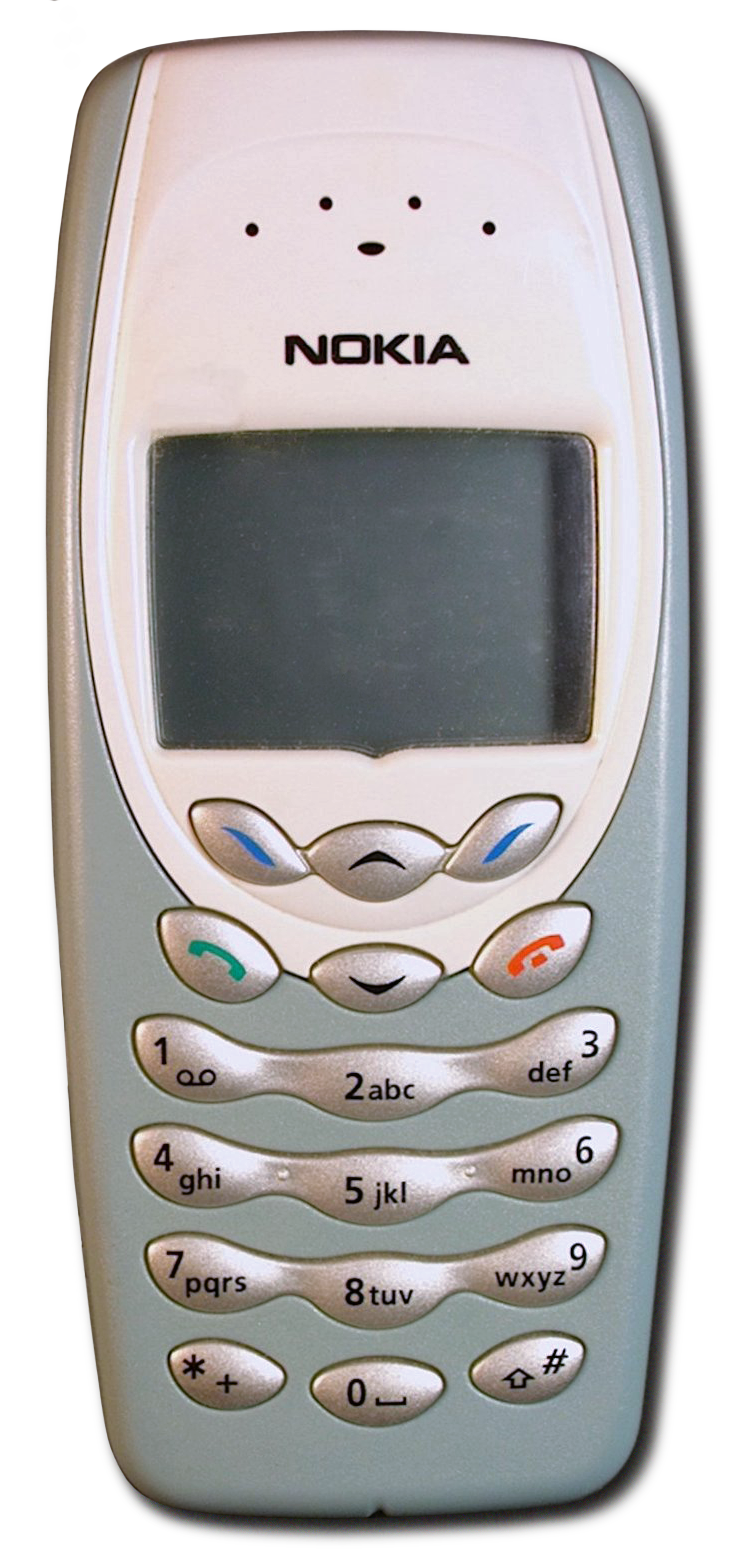
- Nokia 3410
- Manufacturer: Nokia
- Series: 3000 series
- First released: Q3 2002
- Discontinued: Q4 2004/Q1 2005
- Predecessor: Nokia 3310
- Successor: Nokia 3510
- Related: Nokia 3350
- Compatible networks: GSM
- Form factor: Bar
- Dimensions: 115 mm × 49 mm × 22.5 mm (4.53 in × 1.93 in × 0.89 in)
- Weight: 114 g (4.0 oz)
- Storage: 180KB
- Removable storage: No
- Battery: 825 (BLC-1)/900 (BLC-2) mAh battery
- Rear camera: No
- Front camera: No
- Display: 1.4" 96×65 px (83ppi); Monochrome
- Data inputs: Physical keypad
- SAR: 0.81 W/kg (Head)

The Nokia 3410 is a mobile phone made by Nokia, a successor of the popular Nokia 3310 built on the same (DCT3) hardware platform. It was announced at CEBIT on 12 March 2002. The 3410 was one of the first Java phones by Nokia, as well as being one of the earliest mobile phones outside Japan to feature 3D graphics and an image editor. It has an improved (96x65 pixel) resolution and two softkeys over the 3310.

== Release ==
The Nokia 3410 was never released in the Asia-Pacific region, likely due to variants of the 3310 such as the Nokia 3315 (which featured almost the same design cues as the Nokia 3410) and 3350 which had similar hardware and keypad layout, as well as Nokia observing tetraphobia in Asian markets where the number four is viewed as unlucky. (Note: They did however market the Series 40 user interface as such even in Asia.)

== Hardware and software ==
The Nokia 3410 is compact, but somewhat heavy with a weight of 114 grams with the 825mAh removable Li-Ion battery. It has up and down buttons to assist with menu navigation and a stiff black button on the top of the phone serves as a switch to turn profiles on and off. Its display has a higher definition than its predecessor's with 96×65 pixels (as opposed to 84×48 on the 3310). It also came packed with a WAP 1.1 browser, and basic utilities such as a calculator, alarm clock, stop watch, and countdown timer. It also can store up to 10 notes as reminders and has customizable and downloadable profiles. On the entertainment side it comes with five games (Snake II, Bumper, Space Impact, Bantumi, Link5) and a basic SMS messenger.

== 3D graphics ==
The Nokia 3410 was one of the first mobile phones released outside Japan to feature mobile 3D graphics. Despite the phone only featuring a monochrome screen and a 96×65 screen resolution, it includes many of the rendering features from the OpenGL ES 1.0 API, which did not launch till the following year. However, these 3D capabilities were only known to be used in three applications: a 3D text generator, 3D animated screensavers and a 3D game called Munkiki's Castles. The 3D graphics were software rendered via the baseband processor (Texas Instruments MAD2WDI C GSM Baseband Processor). However, due to the low performance of the 12 MHz processor, the polygon count and rendering speed were very limited.

== See also ==
- List of Nokia products
