= Nokia Asha 501 =

2013 smartphone from Nokia

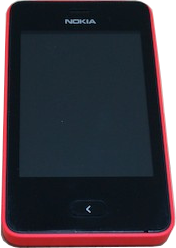
- Manufacturer: Nokia
- Series: Nokia Asha
- Availability by region: Global
- Predecessor: Nokia Asha 310, Nokia Asha 311
- Successor: Nokia X
- Related: Nokia Asha 500, Nokia Asha 230, Nokia Asha 502, Nokia Asha 503
- Form factor: Full Touch candybar
- Dimensions: Width: 58 mm; Height: 99.2 mm; Thickness: 12.1 mm
- Weight: 98.2 g (3 oz)
- Operating system: Nokia Asha software platform 1.0 Upgradeable to Asha software platform 1.4
- Memory: 64 MB RAM
- Removable storage: 4 GB MicroSD card included (supports up to 32 GB)
- Battery: Li-Ion 1200 mAh; Model: BL-4U, removable Single-SIM configuration: Standby: 48 days; Talk time: 17 hours
- Rear camera: 3.2 MP, 2048x1536 pixels Focus: 50 cm to infinity
- Display: 240 x 320 px (QVGA), 3.0"; 133 ppi pixel density
- Sound: 3.5 mm audio connector, hands-free speaker, FM radio, music player
- Connectivity: EDGE EGPRS; Wi-Fi 802.11 b/g/n; Bluetooth 3.0 with Slam; USB 2.0 High Speed via MicroUSB
- Data inputs: Capacitive multi-point touch display
- Other: MicroSIM; Accelerometer; Proximity sensor USB charging
- Website: Nokia Asha 501 (UK)

Nokia Asha 501 is a mobile phone from the budget Nokia Asha series, announced by Nokia on 9 May 2013 in India, and released on 24 June 2013. The device was classified at the time by Nokia as a "Full Touch" smartphone. The phone is available in either single- or dual SIM configurations and its suggested price was US $99 before taxes and subsidies.

The Asha 501 was the first device built on Nokia Asha platform, a new software platform descended from Series 40, with a user interface similar to MeeGo on Nokia N9. The Asha 501 includes Bluetooth and Wi-Fi, but no 3G connectivity, relying on EDGE and GPRS (2.75G) for cellular networking. The phone has been noted for its user-friendliness and a battery with long talk and standby times. It has been called "tiny" by some due to its size, being one of the smallest Nokia ever produced.

== Software ==
Nokia Asha 501 comes preloaded with the Nokia Xpress browser, which (according to Nokia) compresses data server-side by 90% to facilitate the least amount of transferable data with the phone. Nokia Xpress Now is a new app that offers location-based content.

The device was announced to feature built-in social applications for Facebook, Twitter, and LinkedIn. Other apps announced were Here Maps, Bandai Namco games, EA games, eBuddy, CNN, ESPN, and The Weather Channel.

Here Maps beta for Asha 501 was released on 3 July in select countries. Foursquare was released for the model on 25 July; the app won't require GPS and uses location data from the network connection. A LinkedIn app was released on 6 August for Asha 501 and other Asha full-touch phones. On 7 August 2013 the Line instant messaging app was made available for the device. Other instant messaging apps officially on offer are WeChat and eBuddy Mobile Messenger.

WhatsApp is made available for this phone in November 2013.

Facebook messenger was made available for this device on March 18, 2014.

The phone supports 12 languages native to the Indian subcontinent in the on-screen Swipe keyboard. Models sold in South Asia support at least eight languages: English, Urdu, Hindi, Kannada, Gujarati, Tamil, Telugu, and Malayalam.

The selection of included apps and user interface customisations may vary by availability and geographical region.

== Features ==
Nokia Asha 501 has a Nokia Glance Screen and a Nokia Fastlane plus Screen Double-tap.

A panorama camera and a voice guide on camera for self-portrait were introduced in a new update that rolled out in April 2014. This update also brought a paternal control for the apps installed on the phone.

== Reception ==
Nokia Asha 501 has been noted for its battery, which offers long standby and talk times — 52 days and 17 hours, respectively — that in turn allows the phone to be used in places with inefficient or nonexistent electricity supply.

The Asha 501 was followed by the Nokia Asha 500, 502, 503, and 230, all based on the design of the 501.

== Model variants ==
Model	RM-899	RM-900	RM-902
2G (GSM/EDGE)	900/1800 MHz	850/1900 MHz	900/1800 MHz
SIM slots	Single SIM		Dual SIM

== Gallery ==
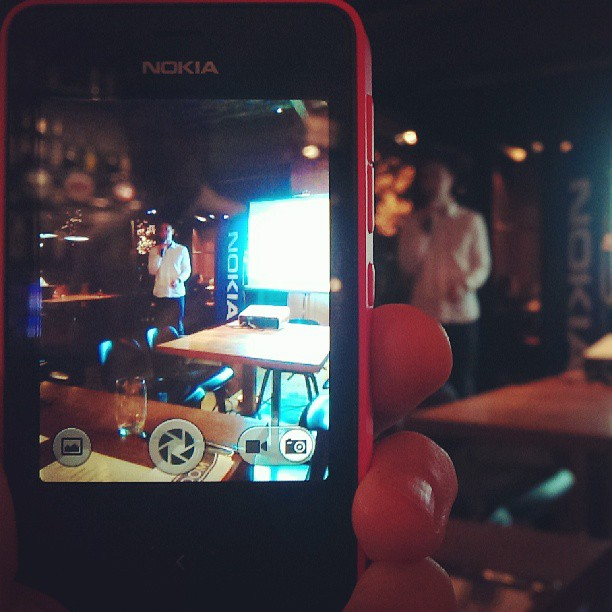
Camera app

== See also ==
- Nokia Asha 500
- List of Nokia products
