= Nokia Asha series =

Discontinued feature phone and smartphone series

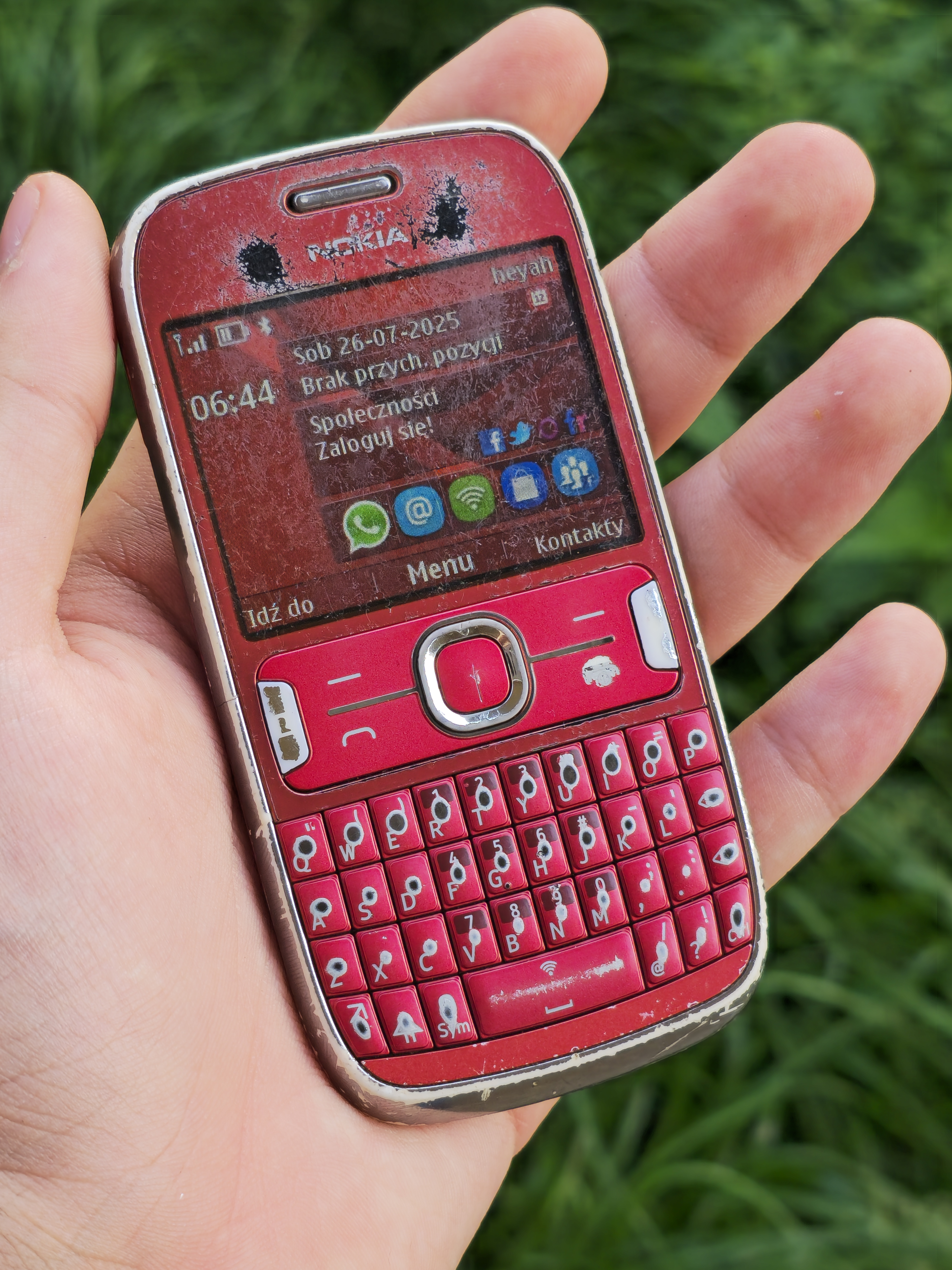
- Nokia Asha 302 in "Plum Red"
- Manufacturers: Nokia (2011–2014); Microsoft Mobile (2014); HMD Global (2026-present)
- Availability by region: 2011–2014; 2026-present
- Predecessor: Nokia Cseries; Nokia Xseries
- Compatible networks: 2G EDGE; 3G HSPA+ (some models); 4G LTE (HMD models)
- Form factor: Various
- Operating system: Proprietary (Series 40, Nokia Asha platform); Pulse OS based on Android (HMD models)
- Memory: Between 16 MB and 128 MB
- Removable storage: microSD (up to 32 GB)
- Battery: Between 1010 mAh and 1430 mAh
- Rear camera: Between 0.3 MP and 5 MP
- Front camera: No
- Display: Between 2.4 inches and 3.0 inches
- Connectivity: Bluetooth 2.1 or 3.0; Wi-Fi (some models); FM radio 3.5 mm audio jack microUSB 2.0
- Data inputs: QWERTY, touch and type, full screen
- Development status: Discontinued

Nokia Asha is a discontinued series of feature phones and low-end smartphones produced and marketed by Nokia. It was marketed from late 2011 until 2014, by which time it was under Microsoft Mobile ownership, before will be revival in 2026 by HMD Global as HMD Asha. The range consisted of QWERTY keyboard, full touchscreen, and hybrid 'touch and type' handsets. Most Asha phones run Series 40 while from 2013 full touch models run the derived Nokia Asha platform.

== History ==
The Nokia Asha range was announced at Nokia World 2011 on 26 October 2011 alongside the Nokia Lumia. Asha was developed for emerging markets with the goal of connecting the "next billion" to the Internet, as cited by then Nokia CEO Stephen Elop. The name "Asha" comes from the Hindi word meaning "hope".

According to The Verge in September 2013, Nokia had a project referred to as Asha on Linux and also as "MView"—a reference to Mountain View. The project used a fork of Android on a low-end handset to maximize margins. The project resulted in the Nokia X family of devices, unveiled at MWC 2014. It was one of two known Android projects at the company, the other was running the OS on high-end Lumia hardware.

On 3 September 2013, Microsoft announced its purchase of Nokia's mobile device business, with the deal closing on 25 April 2014. The company previously announced an intent to use Asha as an "on-ramp" to the Windows Phone platform, but in a company memo released in July 2014, it was announced that as part of cutbacks, Microsoft would end the Asha and Android-based Nokia X range entirely, in favor of solely producing Lumia Windows Phones and Nokia-branded "feature phone" products.

On 11 January 2018, HMD Global acquired the Asha trademark. Also, in 2025, the HMD Touch 4G was released in India with the same design as the Asha, but running MOCOR OS based S30+ instead. In 2026, HMD announced HMD Asha 305 as a revival of the original Nokia Asha 305, but running Android 11-based Pulse OS instead. In 2026, HMD released HMD Touch AI in China, which was the Chinese version of HMD Touch 4G.

== List of devices ==
Below are the mobile phones in the Asha range.

The Asha 305 and Asha 311 models are known as the first generation of Asha Full Touch phones; the second generation is the Asha 50x line. All devices up to the Asha 50x series run the Nokia domestic operating system with Series 40 UI platform, also known as S40. The Asha 501 (released in May 2013), Asha 500, Asha 502, Asha 503 and Asha 230 (announced on 14 February 2014) are powered by the Nokia Asha platform, which builds on S40 and Smarterphone. The revival version of Nokia Asha 305, called HMD Asha 305 are powered by the Pulse OS, which based on Android.

Model	Date announced	SIM config	Input method	Data bearers	Wi-Fi	Display size	RAM	Camera	Operating system	HERE Maps (note: none of the Asha devices have GPS)	Predecessor(s) or similar earlier models (if applicable)
Asha 200	26 Oct 2011	Dual	QWERTY	EDGE, GPRS	No	2.4"	32 MB	2 MP	Series 40		Nokia X1-01 Nokia X2-01
Asha 201	26 Oct 2011	Single	QWERTY	EDGE, GPRS	No	2.4"	32 MB	2 MP	Series 40		Nokia X1-01 Nokia X2-01
Asha 202	27 Feb 2012	Dual	Touch and type	EDGE, GPRS	No	2.4"	16 MB	2 MP	Series 40	Some markets	
Asha 203	27 Feb 2012	Single	Touch and type	EDGE, GPRS	No	2.4"	16 MB	2 MP	Series 40	Some markets	
Asha 205	25 Nov 2012	Single and dual	QWERTY	DTM (MSC 12), EDGE, GPRS	No	2.4"	16 MB	0.3 MP	Series 40		Nokia Asha 200 (dual SIM version) Nokia Asha 201 (single SIM version)
Asha 210	24 Apr 2013	Single and dual	QWERTY	DTM (MSC 12), EDGE, GPRS	Yes	2.4"	32 MB	2 MP	Series 40	Yes	
Asha 230	24 Feb 2014	Single and dual	Capacitive touchscreen	EDGE, GPRS	No	2.8"	64 MB	1.3 MP	Nokia Asha platform		
Asha 300	26 Oct 2011		Touch and type	HSDPA Cat9 (10.2 Mbit/s); HSUPA Cat5 (2.0 Mbit/s)	No	2.4"	128 MB	5 MP	Series 40		Nokia C3-01
Asha 302	27 Feb 2012		QWERTY	HSDPA Cat10 (14.4 Mbit/s); HSUPA Cat6 (5.76 Mbit/s)	Yes	2.4"	128 MB	3.2 MP	Series 40		Nokia C3-00
Asha 303	26 Oct 2011		QWERTY / Touch and type	HSDPA Cat10 (14.4 Mbit/s); HSUPA Cat6 (5.76 Mbit/s)	Yes	2.6"	128 MB	3.2 MP	Series 40	Yes	Nokia X3-02
Asha 305	6 Jun 2012	Dual	Resistive touch screen	EDGE, GPRS	No	3.0"	32 MB	2 MP	Series 40	Yes	
Asha 306	6 Jun 2012		Resistive touch screen	EDGE, GPRS	Yes	3.0"	32 MB	2 MP	Series 40	Yes	
Asha 308	25 Sep 2012	Dual	Capacitive touch screen	EDGE, GPRS	No	3.0"	64 MB	2 MP	Series 40	Yes	Nokia Asha 305
Asha 309	25 Sep 2012		Capacitive touch screen	EDGE, GPRS	Yes	3.0"	64 MB	2 MP	Series 40	Yes	Nokia Asha 306
Asha 310	13 Feb 2013	Dual	Capacitive touch screen	EDGE, GPRS	Yes	3.0"	64 MB	2 MP	Series 40	Yes	
Asha 311	6 Jun 2012		Capacitive touch screen w/ Gorilla Glass	HSDPA Cat10 (14.4 Mbit/s); HSUPA Cat6 (5.76 Mbit/s)	Yes	3.0"	128 MB	3.2 MP	Series 40	Yes	Nokia 5250
Asha 500	22 Oct 2013	Single and dual	Capacitive touch screen	GPRS, EDGE	Yes	2.8"	64 MB	2 MP	Nokia Asha platform		
Asha 501	9 May 2013	Single and dual	Capacitive multi-point touch display	EDGE, GPRS	Yes	3.0"	64 MB	3.2 MP	Nokia Asha platform	Yes	
Asha 502	22 Oct 2013	Dual	Capacitive touch screen	GPRS, EDGE	Yes	3.0"	64 MB	5 MP +LED flash	Nokia Asha platform		
Asha 503	22 Oct 2013	Single and dual	Capacitive touch screen w/ Gorilla Glass 2	HSDPA Cat7 (7.2 Mbit/s); HSUPA Cat6 (5.76 Mbit/s)	Yes	3.0"	128 MB	5 MP +LED flash	Nokia Asha platform		
HMD Asha 305	2026	Dual	Capacitive touch screen	GPRS, EDGE, LTE	Yes	5.0"	2 GB	2 MP	Pulse OS (Android 11)		Nokia Asha 305

Feature phones without the Asha name powered by S30+/S40

The Nokia 206, 207, 208, 301, Touch 4G and Touch AI were not part of the Asha series as they do not carry the "Asha" branding, despite mistakenly being marketed as such by some carriers and retailers.

Model	Date announced	SIM config	Input method	Data bearers	Wi-Fi	Camera	Operating system	HERE maps	Predecessor(s) or similar earlier models (if applicable)
Nokia 206	25 Nov 2012	Dual	Keypad	EDGE, GPRS		1.3 MP	Series 40	Yes	
Nokia 207	3 Jul 2013		Keypad	HSDPA Cat10 (14.4 Mbit/s); HSUPA Cat6 (5.76 Mbit/s)			Series 40	Yes	
Nokia 208	3 Jul 2013	Single and dual	Keypad	HSDPA Cat10 (14.4 Mbit/s); HSUPA Cat6 (5.76 Mbit/s)		1.3 MP	Series 40	Yes	
Nokia 301	24 Feb 2013	Dual	Keypad	HSDPA Cat10 (14.4 Mbit/s); HSUPA Cat6 (5.76 Mbit/s)		3.15 MP	Series 40	Yes	
HMD Touch 4G	19 Oct 2025	Dual	Touch		yes	3.15 MP	Series 30+ (Mocor OS)	N/A	
HMD Touch AI	2026	Dual	Touch		yes	3.15 MP	Series 30+ (Mocor OS)	N/A	HMD Touch 4G

== See also ==
- Nokia N9
- Nokia X
- Microsoft Lumia
- Symbian
- Nokia 1
