= Nokia Asha 210 =

Mobile phone model

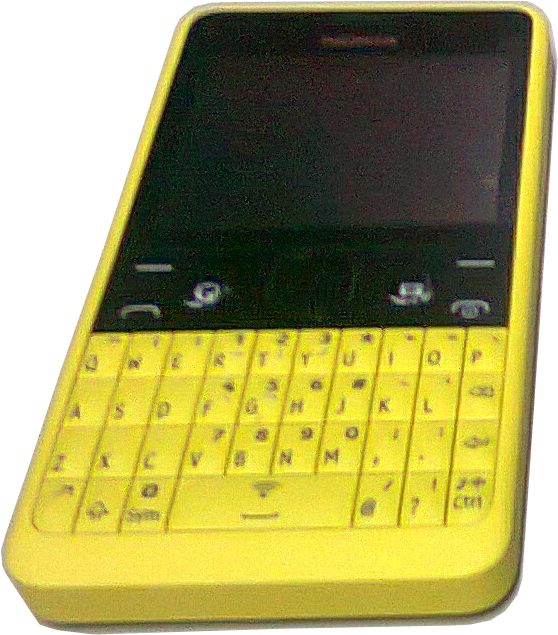
- Brand: Nokia
- Manufacturer: Nokia
- Series: Asha
- First released: April 2013
- Predecessor: Nokia Asha 200/201, Nokia Asha 302
- Successor: Nokia Asha 500
- Related: Nokia Asha 205
- Dimensions: Height: 111.5 mm Width: 60 mm Thickness: 11.8 mm
- Weight: 100 g (4 oz)
- Operating system: Nokia Series 40
- Memory: 32 MB RAM, 64 MB ROM
- Removable storage: Micro SD card up to 32GB
- Battery: Li-Ion (BL-4U); Capacity: 1200 mAh
- Rear camera: Sensor size: 2 megapixels Video: 176 x 144 pixels (10fps)
- Front camera: N/A
- Display: Display size: 2.4"; Orientation: Landscape (320 x 240); Pixel Density: 169 ppi Colors: 65536; Technology: LCD
- Connectivity: 3.5 mm Nokia AV Connector; 2.0 mm Charging Connector; Bluetooth 2.1 + EDR; Remote SyncML synchronisation Local SyncML synchronisation
- Data inputs: QWERTY Keyboard
- Website: http://www.nokia.com/global/

The Nokia Asha 210 is a dual-band QWERTY messenger phone powered by the Series 40 operating system. It was officially announced on April 24, 2013, and it is part of the Nokia Asha series of feature phones. There are both single SIM and dual SIM versions available. It retailed for $72 upon release. Depending by market and mode, the Asha 210 has a dedicated button for either the WhatsApp application, Facebook, or the web browser.

Models sold in Singapore, Indonesia and Malaysia support three languages: English, Indonesian and Simplified Mandarin.

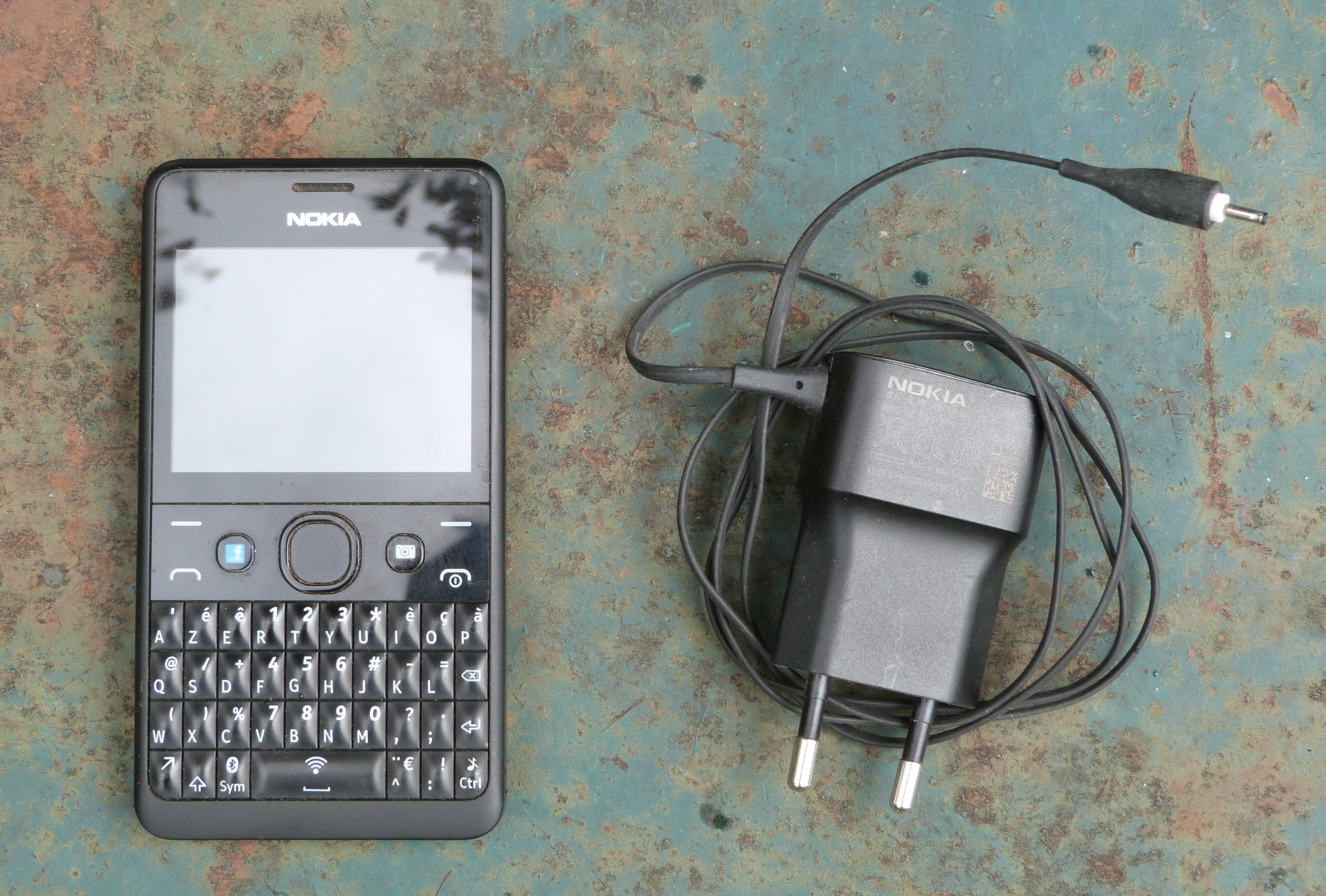
Nokia Asha 210 with Facebook button and French charger.

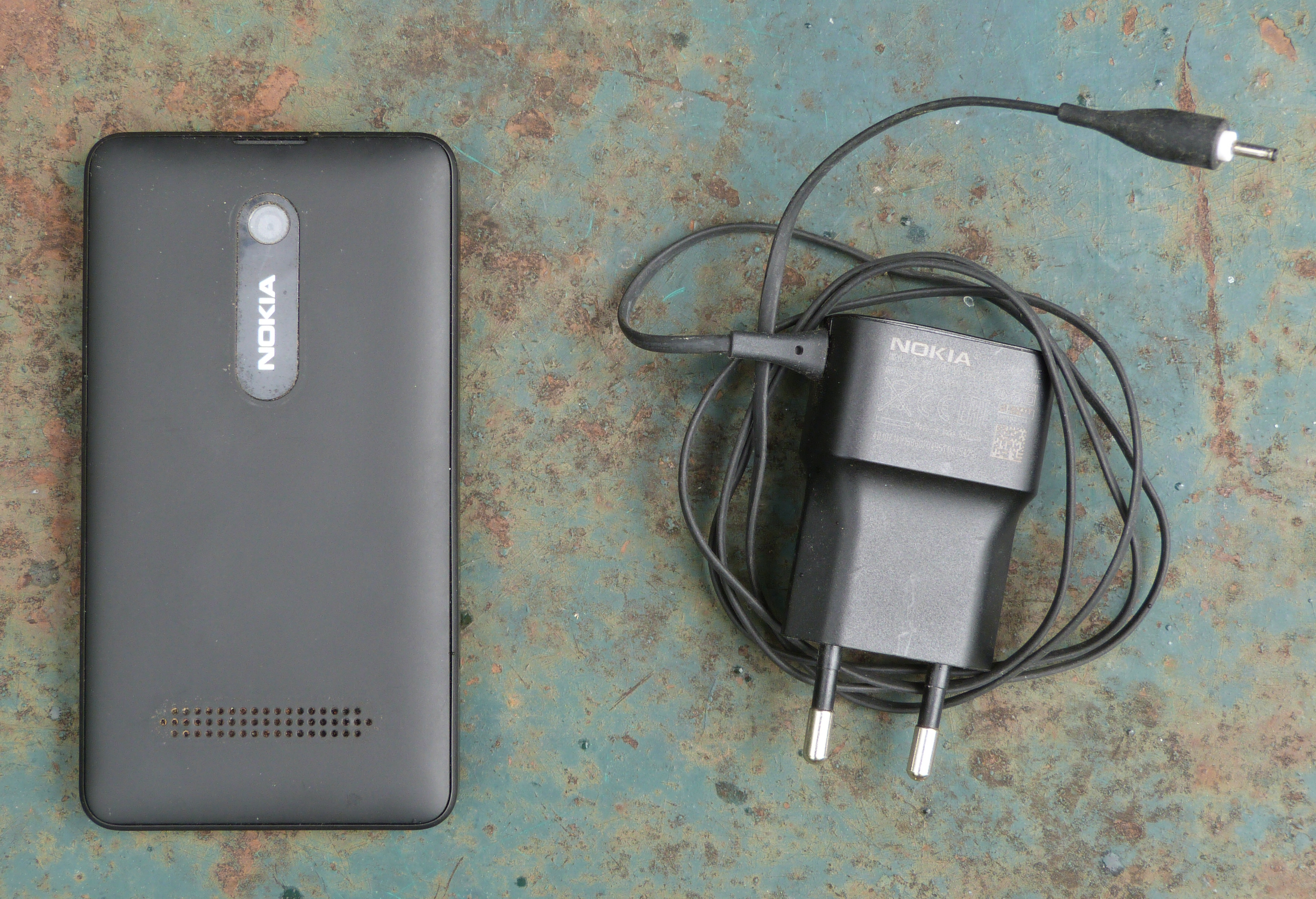
Nokia Asha 210 seen from behind.
