= Nokia Asha 309 =

Mobile phone developed by Nokia

- Manufacturer: Nokia
- Series: Nokia Asha
- Predecessor: Nokia Asha 306
- Compatible networks: GSM 850 / 900 / 1800 / 1900; GPRS/EDGE class B
- Form factor: Full Touch candybar
- Dimensions: Width: 54 mm; Height: 109.9 mm; Thickness: 13.2 mm
- Weight: 102 g (4 oz)
- Operating system: Nokia Asha OS
- CPU: ringtone = Nokia Tune
- Memory: 64 MB RAM; 128 MB ROM
- Storage: 128MB ROM memory, 20 MB available for user
- Removable storage: up to 32 GB microSDHC
- Battery: BL-4U 1110 mAh Li-Ion battery (removable); micro USB and pinhole charger connector
- Rear camera: 2 MP (CMOS sensor) EDoF
- Front camera: No
- Display: 240 x 400 px (WQVGA), 3.0 inch (155 ppi), 18 bits
- Connectivity: Wi-fi 802.11 b/g/n (2.4 GHz); bluetooth v3.0 + A2DP; micro USB 2.0; USB On-the-Go 1.3; 3.5 mm headphone jack connector (audio in/out); Mini SIM card; Stereo FM receiver with RDS
- Data inputs: Capacitive multipoint-touch display; External functional hardware keys

Nokia Asha 309 is a mid-range phone and the successor to the Nokia Asha 306. The phone was announced in September 2012. The phone features a capacitive touch screen and WLAN Wi-Fi over the dual-sim feature seen in Nokia Asha 308.

== See also ==
- List of Nokia products
