= Nokia 206 =

Mobile phone developed by Nokia

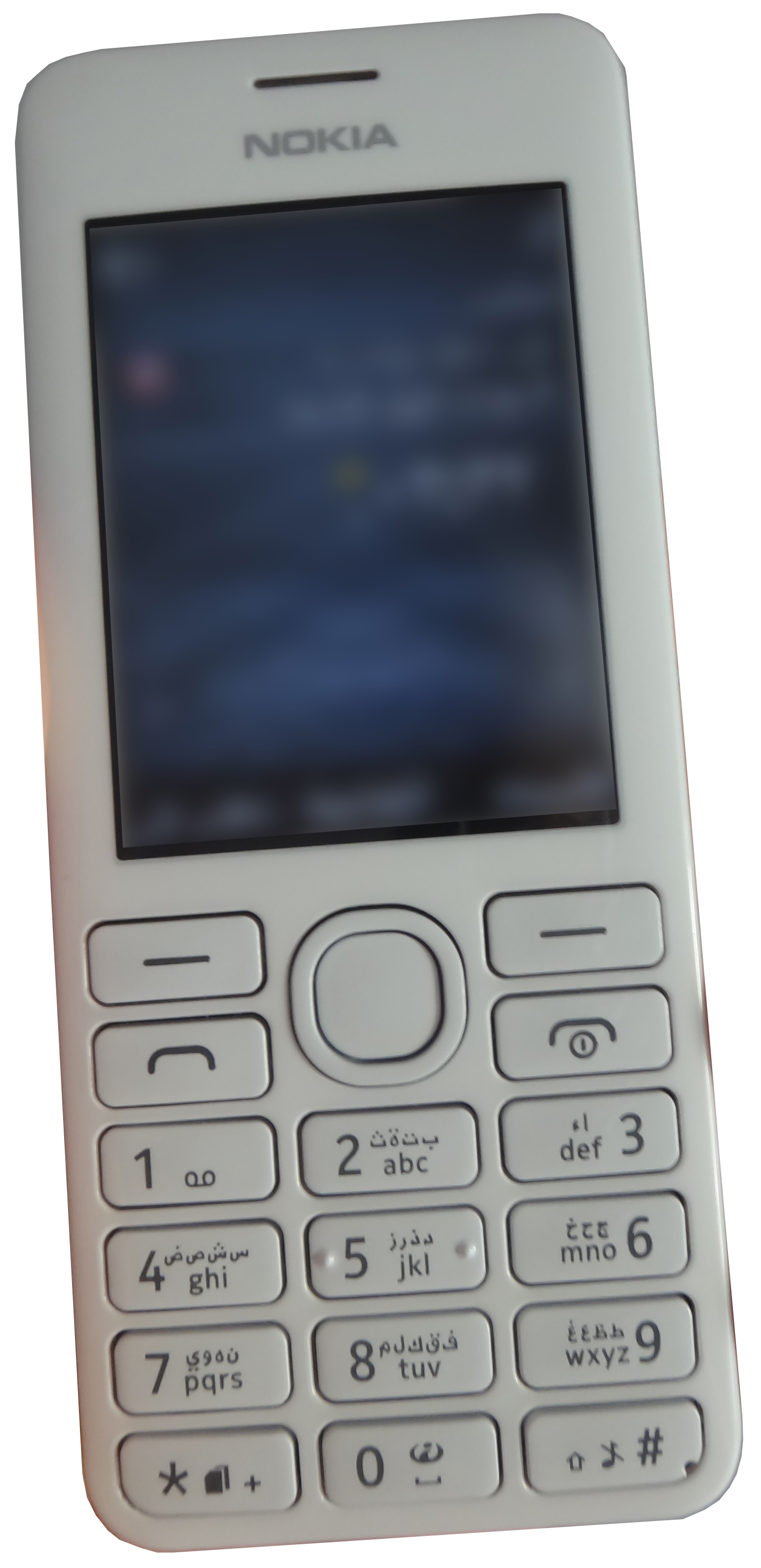
- Manufacturer: Nokia
- Type: Feature phone, Camera phone
- Series: Nokia 3-digit series
- First released: Q4 2012
- Predecessor: Nokia Asha 200/201
- Successor: Nokia 208, Nokia 301, Nokia 515
- Compatible networks: GSM (850/1900 MHz); GSM (900/1800 MHz); GPRS and EDGE
- Form factor: Monoblock
- Colors: Cyan, Magenta, Yellow, Black, White
- Dimensions: Height: 116.0 mm Width: 49.4 mm Thickness: 12.4 mm
- Weight: 91 g (3.2 oz)
- Operating system: Nokia Series 40
- Storage: 64 MB
- Removable storage: microSD, up to 32 GB
- SIM: mini-SIM (2 slots)
- Battery: Capacity: 1110 mAh; Maximum 2G standby time: 680 h Maximum 2G talk time: 20 h Music playback time: 41 h
- Rear camera: Sensor size: 1.3 MP; Resolution: 1280 x 960 pixels Video: 176 x 144 pixels (15fps)
- Front camera: None
- Display: Display size: 2.4"; Orientation: Portrait (240 x 320); Height: 58.0 mm Width: 48.0 mm Colors: 65K; Technology: LCD
- Connectivity: 3.5 mm headphone jack; Bluetooth 2.1; FM radio, Stereo, RDS, recording; 2.0 mm Charging Connector
- Data inputs: Keypad
- Model: RM-872

Nokia 206 is an entry-level dual-SIM mobile phone from Nokia. It was announced alongside the Nokia Asha 205 in November 2012 and was first released in January 2013. It is the successor to the Nokia Asha 200 and Nokia Asha 201. However, the Nokia 206 is not an Asha device.

== Appearance ==
The colors introduced to this phone are very vivid and very similar to Nokia Lumia series. The selected colors are cyan, magenta, yellow, black and white. The device has 'uni colored' body rather than combination. The back design of the phone is similar to the Nokia Lumia 920, but the difference is that the Nokia 206 is made by plastic, while Nokia Lumia 920 is made by zirconium boride.

== Camera ==
The device is able to capture pictures at resolution of 1280 x 960 pixels with a 1.3-megapixel camera. Camera features include Landscape orientation, Auto and Manual White Balance settings, Active toolbar, Still image Editor, Full screen viewfinder, Self-timer. Supported video playback frame rate is 15 fps. In addition to that White balance video modes are: Fluorescent, Incandescent, Automatic and Daylight for video recording.

== Connectivity ==
Along with support of EDGE technology, Nokia has taken Bluetooth connectivity to a new level called Nokia Slam, which has put aside the complications of device pairing aside and just require a touch to another Bluetooth supported device to transfer content. Bluetooth v2.1, Supported Profiles (SPP 1.0, DUN, FTP, GOEP, EDR, HFP, OPP, GAP, PBAP 1.0, SAP, SDAP, HSP).

== Software ==
Nokia 206 runs on Nokia Series 40 operating system. The phone comes pre-loaded with several apps and games, including Bejeweled, Need for Speed: Shift, Asphalt 6: Adrenaline and Midnight Pool 3, along with Nokia Xpress browser and social apps, like WhatsApp and Facebook. The pre-loaded apps vary by region/market. User could download more apps from the Ovi Store.
