= Nokia Asha 200/201 =

Mobile phone developed by Nokia

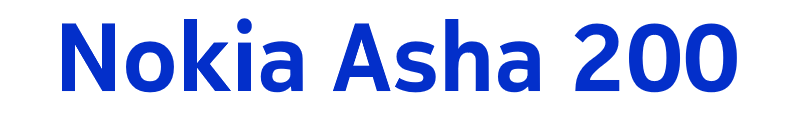

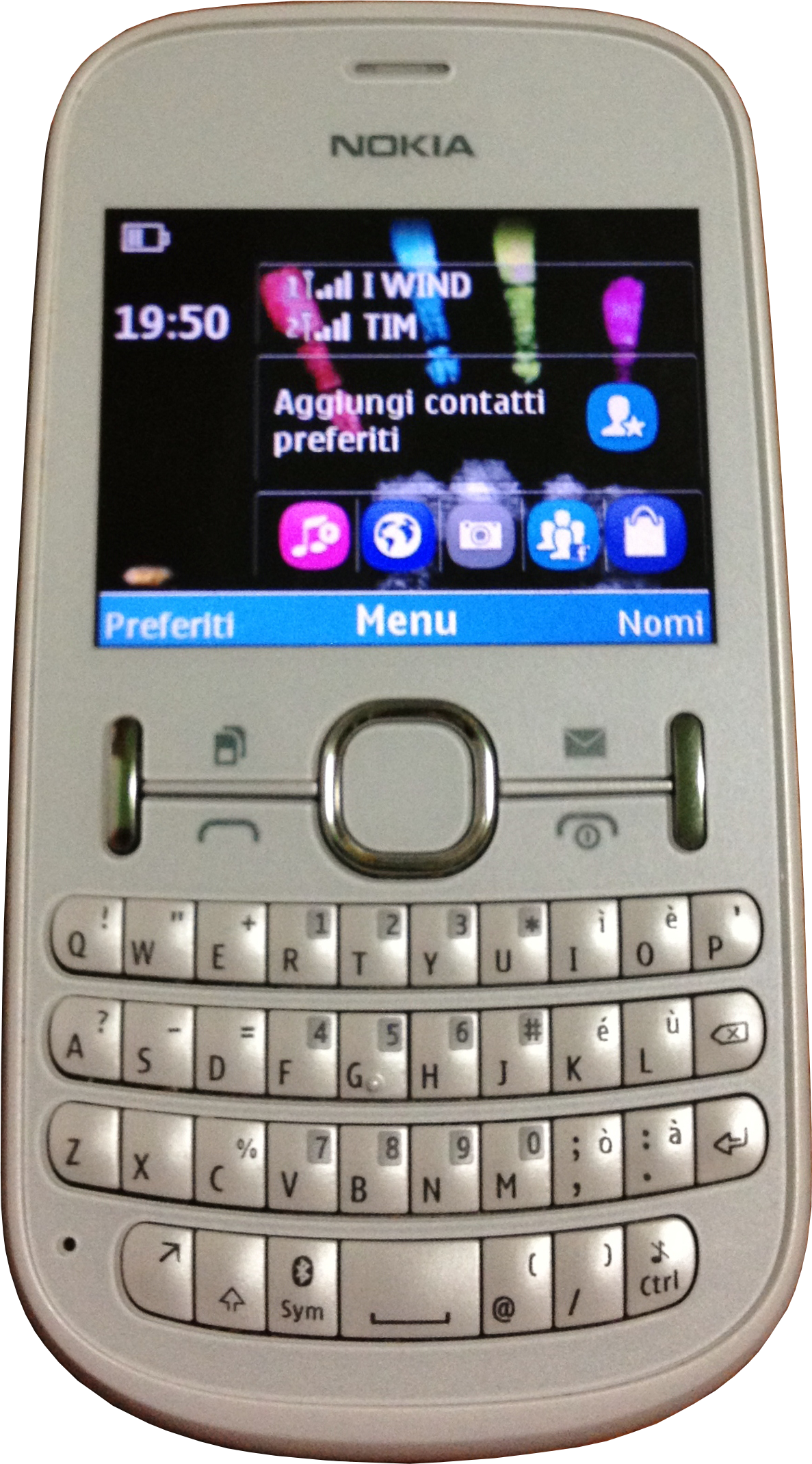
- Brand: Nokia
- Manufacturer: Nokia
- Series: Asha
- First released: December 2011
- Predecessor: Nokia X2-01
- Successor: Nokia Asha 210; Nokia Asha 205
- Related: Nokia Asha 302
- Dimensions: Height: 115.4 mm Width: 61.1 mm Thickness: 14 mm
- Weight: 105 g (4 oz)
- Operating system: Nokia Series 40
- Memory: 32 MB RAM, 64 MB ROM
- Storage: 10 MB Built-In
- Removable storage: Micro SD card up to 32GB
- Battery: Li-Ion (BL-5J); Capacity: 1430 mAh; Maximum standby time: 888 h Maximum talk time: 7 h Music playback time: 52 h
- Rear camera: Sensor size: 2 megapixels Resolution: 1600 x 1200 pixels Video: 176 x 144 pixels (10fps)
- Front camera: Null
- Display: Display size: 2.4"; Orientation: Landscape (320 x 240); Pixel Density: 167 ppi Height: 36.0 mm Width: 48.0 mm Colors: 262144; Technology: LCD
- Connectivity: 3.5 mm Nokia AV Connector; 2.0 mm Charging Connector; Bluetooth 2.1 + EDR; Remote SyncML synchronisation Local SyncML synchronisation
- Data inputs: QWERTY Keyboard
- Website: http://www.nokia.com/global/

The Nokia Asha 200 (dual SIM) and Nokia Asha 201 (single SIM) are budget-level QWERTY keyboard mobile phones released in December 2011 as part of the Nokia Asha line. Both devices run the Nokia Series 40 mobile operating system. There is no direct predecessor of the phones, though the closest to it is the Nokia X2-01, which has similar features and a very similar user interface, as well as having better music capabilities. The Nokia C3 is also an indirect predecessor, also using similar features, though the C3 is a higher end device. The phones are successors to the Nokia X1-01, as they use the same bright colors and the same Dual SIM support for Nokia Asha 200.

== Colors ==
There were four main colors introduced to this phone, namely, pink, blue, black and white. In addition, other colors introduced for selected regions were graphite, green, aqua, pearl white, light pink & orange. The device has uni-colored body rather than combination.

== Camera ==
The device is able to capture pictures at a resolution of 1600 × 1200 pixels with its 2.0-megapixel camera. The results are good for day to day usage like instant sharing or updating profiles on social networks as the phone supports apps like Facebook and Twitter.

Features:

- Landscape orientation
- Auto and Manual White Balance settings
- Active toolbar
- Still image Editor
- Full-screen viewfinder
- Self-timer
- 15 fps frame rate for video playback

White balance video recording modes:

- Fluorescent
- Incandescent
- Automatic
- Daylight
- Brightness with intense glow

== Browsing ==
Enabled with the EDGE/EGPRS (2G) & GSM (2G) support, Nokia 200/201 is embedded with Nokia's Series 40 browser with supported technologies of Javascript 1.8, XHTML, WAP 2.0, HTML 4.0 (XHTML 1.1). Available email solutions for device are: Hotmail, Yahoo! Mail, Nokia Email & Gmail, following IM (Instant Messaging) services like Google Talk, Facebook chat, MySpace, Windows Live Messenger & Nokia Chat.

== Software and applications ==
The phone's interface is based on Nokia's Series 40 interface featuring java games and applications. Device has embedded utilities like Dictionary, Digital clock, Recorder, Calculator, Clock, Calendar, Phonebook, Converter, Fixed Dialing Number, Notes, Alarm clock, Reminders, To-do list.
