= Nokia Lumia 530 =

Smartphone model by Nokia

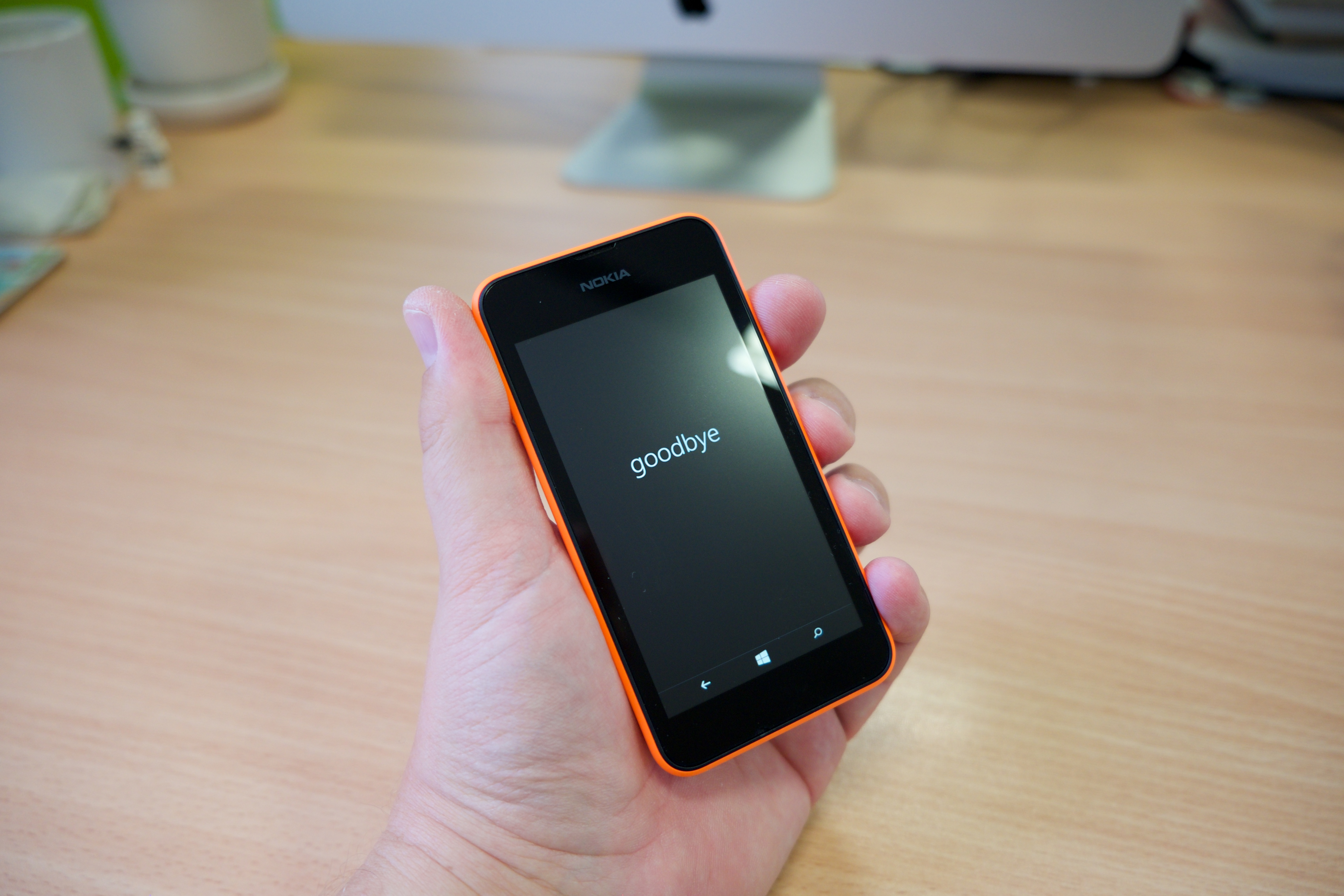
- Manufacturer: Microsoft (Branded as Nokia)
- Type: Smartphone
- Series: Lumia
- First released: 21 July 2014
- Availability by region: 16 August 2014
- Predecessor: Nokia Lumia 505; Nokia Lumia 520; Nokia Asha 501
- Successor: Microsoft Lumia 535; Nokia 3 (2017)
- Related: Nokia Lumia 630; Nokia Lumia 730; Nokia Lumia 830; Nokia Lumia 930
- Compatible networks: GSM/GPRS/EDGE 850/900/1800/1900; HSPA 900/2100 (+ 850/1900 for RM-1018/RM-1020)
- Form factor: Slate
- Dimensions: 119.7 mm (4.71 in) H 62.3 mm (2.45 in) W 11.7 mm (0.46 in) D
- Weight: 129 g (4.6 oz)
- Operating system: Windows Phone 8.1
- System-on-chip: Qualcomm Snapdragon 200 MSM8212
- CPU: 1.2 GHz quad-core Qualcomm Krait
- GPU: Qualcomm Adreno 302
- Memory: 512 MB RAM
- Storage: 4 GB Internal
- Removable storage: up to 128 GB, microSD
- Battery: Nokia BL-5J 1430 mAh (stand-by time 4 days)
- Rear camera: 5 MP fixfocus, f/2.4 without flash, FWVGA 864x480 video
- Display: 4-inch TFT LCD, 480x854 resolution, 246ppi
- Connectivity: Bluetooth 4.0 (LE); Assisted GPS; GPS/GLONASS; Micro-USB 2.0; Wi-Fi :802.11b/g/n, WiFi Hotspot; Wi-Fi-based positioning system (WPS); FM radio, Internet radio
- Data inputs: Multi-touch capacitive touchscreen, proximity sensor - touch based, no optic sensor
- Other: Talk time (2G): up to 14.8 hours Talk time (3G): 9.6 h Stand-by time: up to 360 hours (15 days); Maximum cellular network browsing time: 6.7 h Music playback time: 61 h (2.5 days)
- Website: Nokia Lumia 530

The Nokia Lumia 530 is an entry-level smartphone developed by Nokia and released by Microsoft Mobile that runs the Windows Phone 8.1 operating system. It was succeeded by the Microsoft Lumia 535, just three months after its release.

== Hardware ==
The Lumia 530 comes in a slate form factor with a 4-inch touchscreen. The viewing angles are slightly reduced compared to other phones in the Lumia line.

== Software ==
The Lumia 530 ships with Microsoft Windows Phone 8.1, as well as exclusive software like Nokia Mix Radio and HERE Maps (featuring turn-by-turn directions, offline maps and navigation, and transit info).

== Reception ==
Ars Technica and PC Advisor considered the Lumia 530 a downgrade from the Lumia 520, noting the lack of a dedicated camera button and auto-focus, a lower-quality display, and lower-end GPU. The limited amount of RAM made some games unplayable and crippled multitasking.

== Variants ==
There are two dual sim variants: RM-1019 and RM-1020

Model	RM-1017	RM-1018	RM-1019	RM-1020
Countries	International	Americas / APAC	International	Brazil / Thailand
Carriers/Providers	various	various	n/a	n/a
2G	Quad band GSM/EDGE (850/900/1800/1900 MHz)			
3G	900/2100 MHz	850/900/1900/2100 MHz	900/2100 MHz	850/900/1900/2100 MHz
Max network speed	HSPA+: 21 Mbit/s			

== See also ==
- Microsoft Lumia
- Nokia Lumia 520
- Nokia Lumia 525
- Nokia X, X+, XL
