= Nokia Asha 230 =

Nokia enrtry-level smartphone

- Brand: Nokia
- Manufacturer: Nokia
- Type: Feature phone
- Series: Nokia Asha series
- First released: February 24, 2014
- Form factor: Slate
- Colors: Black, Yellow, Green, Blue, Red, and White
- Dimensions: 99.5 mm (3.92 in) H 58.6 mm (2.31 in) W 13.2 mm (0.52 in) D
- Weight: 89.3 g (3.15 oz)
- Operating system: Nokia Asha platform 1.1.1 (upgradable)
- System-on-chip: Snapdragon S4 MSM8225
- CPU: 1.2 GHz dual-core ARM Cortex-A5
- GPU: Adreno 203
- Memory: 64 MB RAM
- Removable storage: microSD
- Battery: 1020 mAh Li-Ion
- Rear camera: 1.3 MP, fixed focus, f/2.8 QVGA video @ 25 fps
- Front camera: No
- Display: 2.8 in (71 mm) LCD; 320 x 240 pixels (143 ppi); 256K colors
- Sound: 3.5 mm jack, loudspeaker
- Media: MP3, Radio (FM Stereo)
- Connectivity: Bluetooth 3.0, Micro-USB 2.0
- Data inputs: Accelerometer, Proximity sensor
- Model: RM-987
- SAR: Head: 1.06 W/kg; Body: 0.84 W/kg

The Nokia Asha 230 is an entry-level touchscreen mobile phone that was manufactured and branded by Nokia and was released on February 24, 2014 at MWC 2014 in Barcelona as part of the Asha series.

The software update lets later consumers have 7GB of free storage from the rebranded and updated Microsoft OneDrive cloud service.

== Features ==
- 1.3-megapixel camera with OGVA video
- Nokia Asha platform 1.1.1
- microSD card, up to 32GB
- 2.8-inch display, with 256K colors
- Accessibility to social platforms (e.g. Twitter, Facebook, Whatsapp, Direct Chat, Viber, WeChat, Vine, and Line)

== Reception ==
Considered as a "game-changer" nominated by Windows Blog, it features affordability, decent brightness in display, 42 hours of music, Nokia Xpress for browsing, and exclusive game gifts.
