= Nokia Asha 202 =

Mobile phone

- Manufacturer: Nokia
- Series: Asha
- First released: July 2012; 14 years ago
- Availability by region: Global
- Compatible networks: GSM 900 / 1800
- Form factor: candybar
- Dimensions: 114.8 x 49.8 x 13.9 mm, 91.5 cc (4.52 x 1.96 x 0.55 in)
- Weight: 90 g (3.17 oz)
- Operating system: Series 40
- Memory: 16 MB
- Storage: 32 MB
- Removable storage: microSD, up to 32 GB (dedicated slot)
- Battery: 1020 mAh (BL-5C)
- Rear camera: 2 MP
- Front camera: No
- Display: 2.4 inch TFT Resistive Touchscreen 240 x 320 pixels, 4:3 ratio (~167 ppi density)
- Connectivity: Bluetooth, USB
- Data inputs: Touch and Type
- Development status: Discontinued

Nokia Asha 202 is a mobile phone from Nokia part of the Asha family, which was released in July 2012. The device features a touchscreen with keypad, and runs on Series 40 Software.

== See also ==
- List of Nokia products
