= Nokia Lumia 510 =

Windows smartphone

- Manufacturer: Nokia
- Series: Nokia Lumia
- First released: October 2012
- Availability by region: December 2012
- Discontinued: 2013
- Predecessor: Nokia 500; Nokia Asha 302; Nokia Asha 311
- Successor: Nokia Lumia 520
- Related: Nokia Lumia 610; Nokia Lumia 710; Nokia Lumia 800; Nokia Lumia 900
- Form factor: Slate
- Dimensions: 120.7 mm (4.75 in) H 64.9 mm (2.56 in) W 11.46 mm (0.451 in) D
- Weight: 129 g (4.6 oz)
- Operating system: Windows Phone 7.8; Windows Phone 7.5 Mango (not able to be updated to Windows Phone 8)
- Memory: 256 MB RAM
- Storage: 4 GB internal flash (Only 2.88 GB available to the user)
- Removable storage: No
- Battery: Rechargeable 1300 mAh BP-3L
- Rear camera: 5-megapixel without flash
- Front camera: No
- Display: 480x800 px
- Website: Nokia Lumia 510

Nokia Lumia 510 is a budget Windows Phone 7 smartphone developed by Nokia designed specifically for developing markets, such as China, India, Asia-Pacific and Latin America, running the Windows Phone 7.5 (later Windows Phone 7.8) operating system. Unveiled on 23 September 2012, it was released in November of the same year.

The phone shares the limitations of the Nokia Lumia 610, like not being able to run all Windows Phone applications and not being able to run all background tasks.

Phone Arena has criticized the lack of microSD slot for storage expansion given so little internal storage, the lack of camera flash, the lack of a front-facing camera, the low-resolution video capture and too little RAM memory (256 MB RAM) that makes the phone slow and prevents running some applications.

On 25 February 2013, the Nokia Lumia 520, the successor of the Nokia Lumia 510, was presented. The improvements are Windows Phone 8, dual-core 1 GHz Qualcomm S4 chipset, 512 MB of RAM, a better IPS panel display and support for up to 64 GB microSD cards.

== Specifications ==
=== Hardware ===
The Lumia 510 has a 4.0-inch TFT capacitive display. It is powered by an 800 MHz Cortex-A5 Qualcomm Snapdragon S1 processor, 256 MB of RAM and 4 GB of internal storage. It has a 1300 mAh Li-ion battery and a 5-megapixel rear camera. It is available in white, cyan, black, red and yellow.

=== Software ===
The Lumia 510 ships with Windows Phone 7.8.

== See also ==
- Windows Phone
- Nokia Lumia 710
- Nokia Lumia 800
- Nokia Lumia 900
