= Nokia Asha 308 =

Mobile phone developed by Nokia

- Manufacturer: Nokia
- Series: Full Touch
- Availability by region: Global
- Predecessor: Nokia Asha 305
- Compatible networks: only data: GSM 900 / 1800; GPRS/EDGE class B, multislot class 33
- Form factor: Full Touch candybar
- Dimensions: Width: 54 mm; Height: 109.9 mm; Thickness: 13 mm
- Weight: 104 g (4 oz)
- Operating system: Nokia Asha Series 40 OS
- Memory: 64 MB RAM; 128 MB ROM
- Storage: 128MB ROM memory
- Removable storage: up to 32 GB microSDHC
- Battery: BP-4U 1100 mAh Li-Ion battery (removable); micro USB and 2 mm DC plug charging
- Rear camera: 2 MP (CMOS sensor) EDoF
- Front camera: No
- Display: 240 x 400 px (WQVGA), 3.0 inch (155 ppi), 18 bits, Capacitive touch screen
- Connectivity: bluetooth 3.0 + A2DP; micro USB 2.0; 3.5 mm AV connector (audio in/out); SIM card; FM receiver with RDS
- Data inputs: Capacitive multipoint-touch display; External functional hardware keys
- Development status: Announced

Nokia Asha 308 is a mid range phone and the successor to the Nokia Asha 305. It was announced in September, 2012 and was released in October, 2012. The phone features dual-sim over the Wi-Fi feature seen in Nokia Asha 309.

== See also ==
- List of Nokia products
