= Nokia 5230 =

Nokia touchscreen smartphone released in 2009

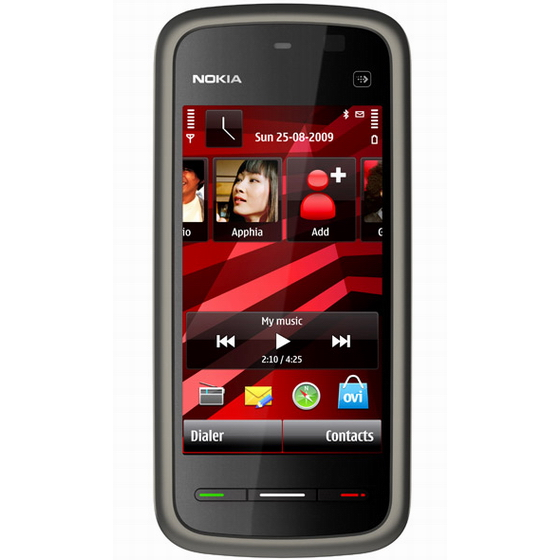
- Manufacturer: Nokia
- Availability by region: November 2009; 17 years ago
- Predecessor: Nokia 5220
- Successor: Nokia 5250; Nokia C5-03
- Related: Nokia 5800 XpressMusic
- Compatible networks: Nokia 5230: GSM/EDGE: 850/900/1800/1900, WCDMA: 850/1700/2100 (Nuron), 850/900/1900/2100 (non-Nuron); Nokia 5233/5228: GSM/UMTS/EGPRS Quad-Band 850/900/1800/1900 MHz, GPS
- Form factor: Candybar, Touchscreen
- Dimensions: 111×51.7×15.5 mm (4.37×2.04×0.61 in)
- Weight: 115 g (4 oz) (with stylus)
- Operating system: Symbian OS v9.4 S60v5 (Firmware Version V51.0.002)
- CPU: Single-core CPU, 434 MHz ARM11
- Memory: 128 MB DDR SDRAM, 256 MB NAND, 80 MB Internal User Storage (Nuron RM-588), 128 MB DDR SDRAM, 512 MB NAND, 320 MB Internal User Storage (non-Nuron RM-594 & RM-629)
- Removable storage: MicroSD Memory Card Slot, with hot swap max. 16 GB
- Battery: BL-5J; 1320 mAh Li-Ion standard battery
- Rear camera: 2 megapixels (1600 x 1200)
- Display: 3.2 inches 640 x 360 nHD with 16:9 picture resistive touchscreen LCD TFT (16.7 million colours) and Brilliant quality display 14MP
- Connectivity: Micro-USB connector, USB 2.0 high speed, 3.5 mm Nokia AV connector, Bluetooth version 2.0 with A2DP and AVRCP, GPS, AGPS
- Data inputs: Touchscreen, Dedicated keys for camera, volume, power, send & end, and (menu), Voice commands, Accelerometer
- Development status: Discontinued

The Nokia 5230 (also known as the Nokia 5230 Nuron) is a smartphone manufactured by Nokia, running Symbian OS v9.4, S60 5th Edition. It was released in November 2009 after being announced on August 25th of the same year.

It features a 3.2-inch resistive touchscreen, 3G internet support and support for microSD memory cards. It also supports A-GPS, Bluetooth, FM radio and full HTML internet browsing. However, it lacks support for Wi-Fi due to its status as an entry-level smartphone. It was released after with the Nokia 5530 and Nokia 5800 XpressMusic, which featured Wi-Fi support (but not 3G) and both 3G and Wi-Fi, respectively.

51.0.002 is the latest firmware version available.

== Variants ==
=== 5233/5228 ===
A cost-reduced variant called the 5233 (5228 in some markets) was released in 2010. It also shares the same form factor as the base 5800 and 5230, but is further cut down as it lacks support for 3G networks.

=== 5230 Nuron ===
The Nuron version, released only in North America, which has WCDMA Band IV (AWS) enabled, comes preloaded with maps of the United States, Canada and Mexico. In January 2010, Nokia announced that Ovi Maps will be available for free for certain smartphones which includes the Nokia 5230, thus enabling free offline voice guided navigation for more than 180 countries.

== Issues ==
An incident involving a used Nokia 5233 occurred in 2018, eight years after the phone was released, when a teenage girl in India died as a result of injuries stemming from her 5233 as its battery exploded whilst in the middle of a conversation with a relative.
