= Nokia Mail and Nokia Chat =

Mobile phone services

Nokia Mail and Nokia Chat (earlier Nokia Email and Ovi Mail) were services developed by Microsoft Mobile and earlier by Nokia for its mobile phones. The service operated as a centralized, hosted service that acted as a proxy between the Messaging client and the user's e-mail server. The phone did not connect directly to the e-mail server, but instead sent e-mail credentials to Nokia's servers. On 13 August 2008 Nokia launched a beta release of "Nokia Email service", a push e-mail service, later incorporated into Nokia Messaging. The original version of Nokia Messaging was launched in 2008 with the Nokia N97 line of smartphones and was exclusive to Finland, the United Kingdom, the Netherlands, Germany, Spain, Singapore, Australia and Venezuela before being expanded to other countries and was exclusive to Symbian handsets, Series 40 support was announced for 2009. The first public version of Nokia Messaging supports Windows Live Hotmail accounts, Yahoo! accounts, and Google accounts and was available in 12 languages.

Originally Nokia operated a service called Ovi Mail which was used on their S40, Symbian, and MeeGo devices, and was eventually bundled with all Lumia Windows Phone 7 devices, in 2011 Nokia has chosen to migrate Ovi Mail and Ovi Chat accounts to Yahoo! services, at the time Ovi Mail had over 9 million active users. As Yahoo! Mail is built into Windows Phone 7 devices Nokia prompted to its users that they'll have a smooth transition when migrating to Windows Phone. Later Nokia launched Nokia Mail a service powered by Yahoo! accounts for web browsers.

Nokia Mail for Exchange was launched in 2013 for Nokia Asha devices in India, the service was designed to send and receive office emails from their Asha telephones.

The service was acquired by Microsoft in April 2014, as part of the Nokia Devices and Services Division, and closed in March 2015. Microsoft discontinued the service for its devices and advised its users to migrate to Microsoft Skype and Outlook.com.

== See also ==
- Skype
- Outlook.com
- Ovi (Nokia)
- Microsoft Mobile Services
