= Nokia Asha 311 =

Mobile phone developed by Nokia

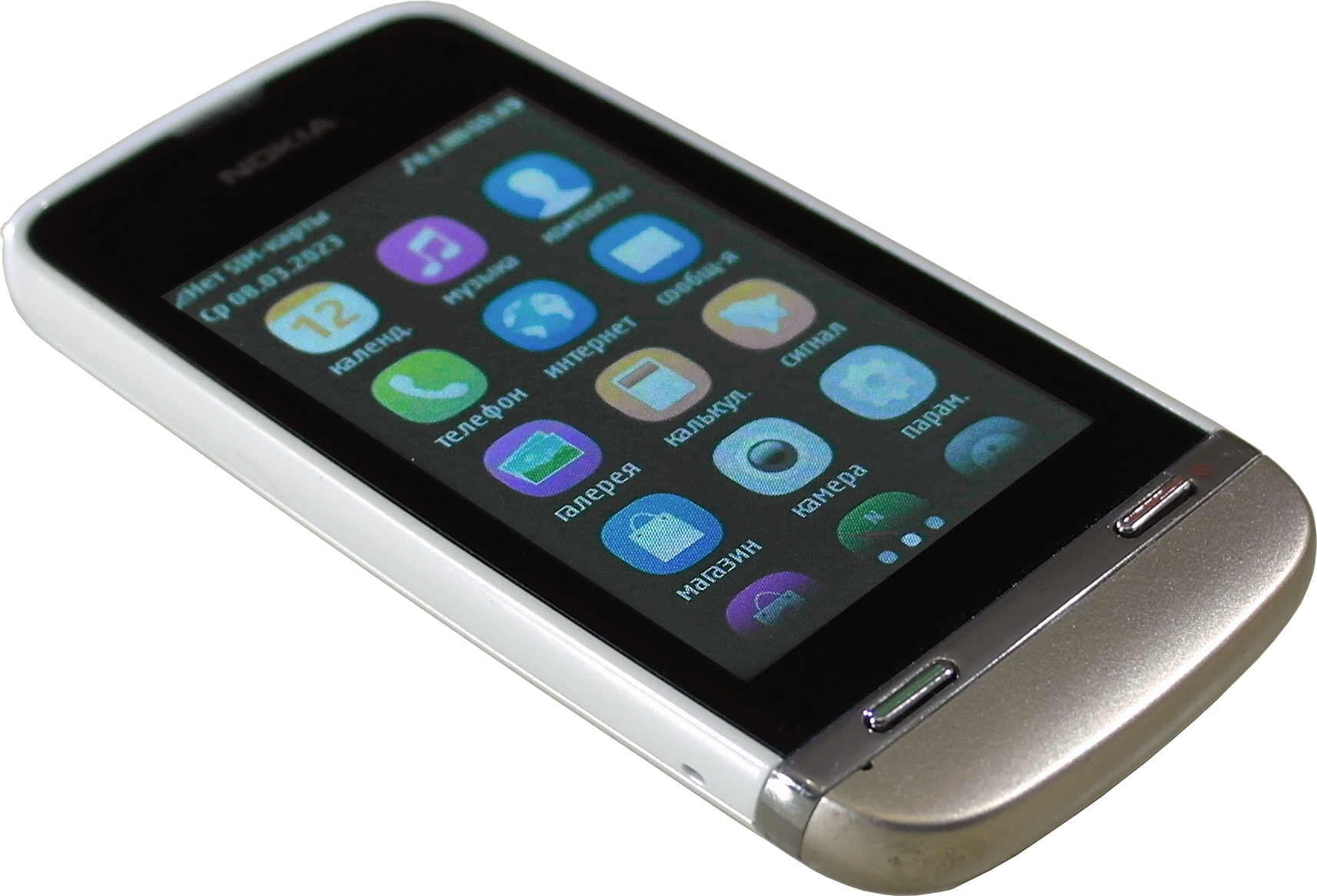
- Series: Full Touch
- Availability by region: Global
- Predecessor: Nokia C5-03; Nokia Asha 303
- Successor: Nokia Lumia 505; Nokia Lumia 510
- Related: Nokia Asha 302
- Compatible networks: GSM 850 / 900 / 1800 / 1900; GPRS/EDGE class B, multislot class 33; UMTS 850 / 900 / 1700 / 1900 / 2100; HSDPA Cat10, 14.4 Mbps; HSUPA Cat6 5.7 Mbps
- Form factor: Full Touch candybar
- Dimensions: Width: 52 mm; Height: 106 mm; Thickness: 12.9 mm
- Weight: 95 g (3 oz)
- Operating system: Nokia Asha Series 40 OS
- CPU: ARM11 1 GHz Samsung K5W2G1GACT – AP50 processor
- Memory: 128 MB RAM; 256 MB ROM
- Storage: 256 MB ROM memory (140 MB available to end user)
- Removable storage: up to 32 GB microSDHC
- Battery: BL-4U 1100 mAh Li-Ion battery (removable); Charging with micro-USB and 2 mm DC plug
- Rear camera: 3.6MP (CMOS sensor) EDoF
- Front camera: No
- Display: 240 x 400 px (WQVGA), 3.0", 18 bits
- Connectivity: WLAN IEEE 802.11 b/g/n (2.4 GHz); Bluetooth 2.1 +EDR; micro-USB 2.0; USB On-the-Go 1.3; 3.5 mm AV connector (audio in/out); SIM card; FM receiver with RDS
- Data inputs: Capacitive multi-point touch display; External functional hardware keys
- Development status: Available

The Nokia Asha 311 is a touchscreen-based feature phone powered by Nokia's Series 40 mobile operating system. It was announced at Bangkok by Nokia along with two others Asha Full Touch devices - the Nokia Asha 305 and 306. The 311 is considered to be the flagship of the Asha Full Touch family. Its main features are the Full Touch capacitive touchscreen, the pentaband 3G radio, SIP VoIP over 3G and Wi-Fi and the ability to play games. Nokia Asha 311 is available in a number of languages depending on which territory it is marketed for. Many other specifications are identical to the QWERTY-based Nokia Asha 303 and 302.

== History and availability ==
The Nokia Asha 311 was announced at Bangkok by Nokia. It was made available 3Q in 2012 globally. The phone was sold at a price of €92 subject to taxes and subsidies.

== See also ==
- List of Nokia products
