= Nokia Lumia 505 =

Smartphone model

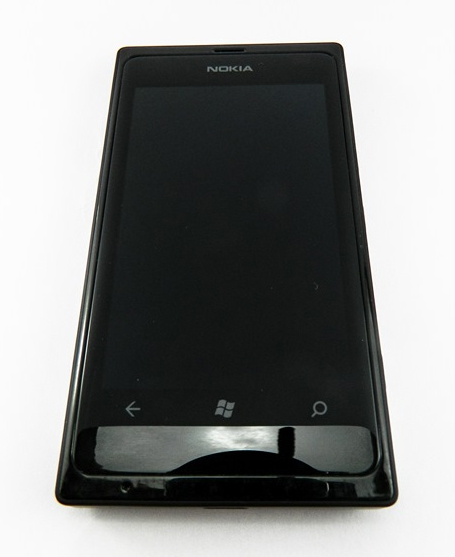
- Manufacturer: Nokia
- Type: Touchscreen smartphone
- Series: Lumia
- First released: January 2013
- Successor: Nokia Lumia 530
- Compatible networks: 2.5G GSM/GPRS/EDGE – 850, 900, 1800, 1900 MHz; 3G UMTS/DC-HSPA+ – 850, 1900 MHz
- Form factor: Bar
- Dimensions: 118.1 mm (4.65 in) H 61.2 mm (2.41 in) W 11.3 mm (0.44 in) D
- Weight: 131 g (4.6 oz)
- Operating system: Windows Phone 7.8
- CPU: 800 MHz single core Qualcomm S1 MSM7227A
- GPU: Qualcomm Adreno 200
- Memory: 256 MB RAM
- Storage: 4 GB internal flash and 7 GB free in SkyDrive
- Battery: Integrated 1300 mAh Li-poly battery
- Rear camera: 8 MP, Wide angle, f/2.8, 34 mm True 16:9 optics, 480p VGA video capture @ 30 fps
- Display: 3.7 in (94 mm) WVGA AMOLED, 800 x 480 pixels at 252 ppi, 15:9 aspect ratio, Color depth 16 bit, 65k colors, 60 Hz refresh rate, Corning Gorilla Glass
- Connectivity: List: Wi-Fi :802.11 a/b/g/n; Wi-Fi-based positioning system (WPS); Bluetooth 2.1 + EDR; Micro-USB 2.0
- Data inputs: Multi-touch capacitive touchscreen and proximity sensor
- Other: Talk time: Up to 7.3 hours Standby time: Up to 300 hours (approx. 12.5 days)
- Website: Nokia Lumia 505

The Nokia Lumia 505 is a budget smartphone developed by Nokia that runs Microsoft's Windows Phone 7.8 operating system. It was announced in December 2012 as a Telcel-exclusive device and became available in early January 2013 in Mexico. In late January 2013 the Lumia 505 became available in Colombia, Chile and Peru on Claro Americas. It was exclusive to the Latin American market and was not announced or released for any other markets.

== Primary features ==
The primary features of the Lumia 505 are:

- 3.7in 800x480 AMOLED 252 PPI touchscreen display with Corning Gorilla Glass
- 8 MP camera
- VGA video and photo recording

== Specifications ==
=== Hardware ===
The Lumia 505 has a 3.7-inch AMOLED capacitive display. It is powered by an 800 MHz Cortex-A5 Qualcomm Snapdragon S1 processor, 256 MB of RAM and 4 GB of internal storage. It has a 1300 mAh Li-ion battery and an 8-megapixel rear camera. It is available in black, white, red and pink.

=== Software ===
The Lumia 505 ships with Windows Phone 7.8.

== Relationship to the Lumia 510 ==
The Lumia 505 is a market-exclusive sister device to the globally released Lumia 510 and shares a number of specifications with it, including utilizing the same 800 MHz Qualcomm Snapdragon processor and having only 256 MB of RAM and 4 GB internal flash memory. The Lumia 505, however, has a slightly different design, with a smaller 3.7-inch AMOLED screen (versus a 4.4-inch LCD screen on the Lumia 510), shorter battery life of 7.2 hours (versus 8.3 hours) and higher resolution 8-megapixel camera (versus 5 megapixels). The Lumia 505 is also available in a different set of colors from the Lumia 510, namely black, white, red, cyan and yellow.

== Availability ==
The phone was originally released for sale exclusively through Telcel in Mexico in the beginning of 2013 as a carrier exclusive for MXN $3,499 without a contract. In late January 2013, it was announced that the phone would also become available in Colombia, Chile and Peru on Claro Americas becoming market exclusive to Latin America.

== See also ==
- Nokia Lumia 510
