= Nokia Asha 203 =

Nokia phone

- Manufacturer: Nokia
- Series: Asha
- First released: February 2012; 14 years ago
- Availability by region: Global
- Form factor: candybar
- Weight: 115 g (4.1 oz)
- Operating system: Series 40
- Memory: 16 MB
- Storage: 32 MB
- Battery: 1020 mAh (BL-5C)
- Rear camera: 2 MP
- Display: 2.4 inch TFT Resistive Touchscreen
- Data inputs: Touch with Keypad

Nokia Asha 203 (also known as Nokia Asha 203 Touch and Type) is a mobile phone from Nokia part of the Asha family, which was released in February 2012. The device features a touchscreen with keypad, and runs on Series 40 Software.

== See also ==
- List of Nokia products
