= Nokia C5-03 =

Cell phone model

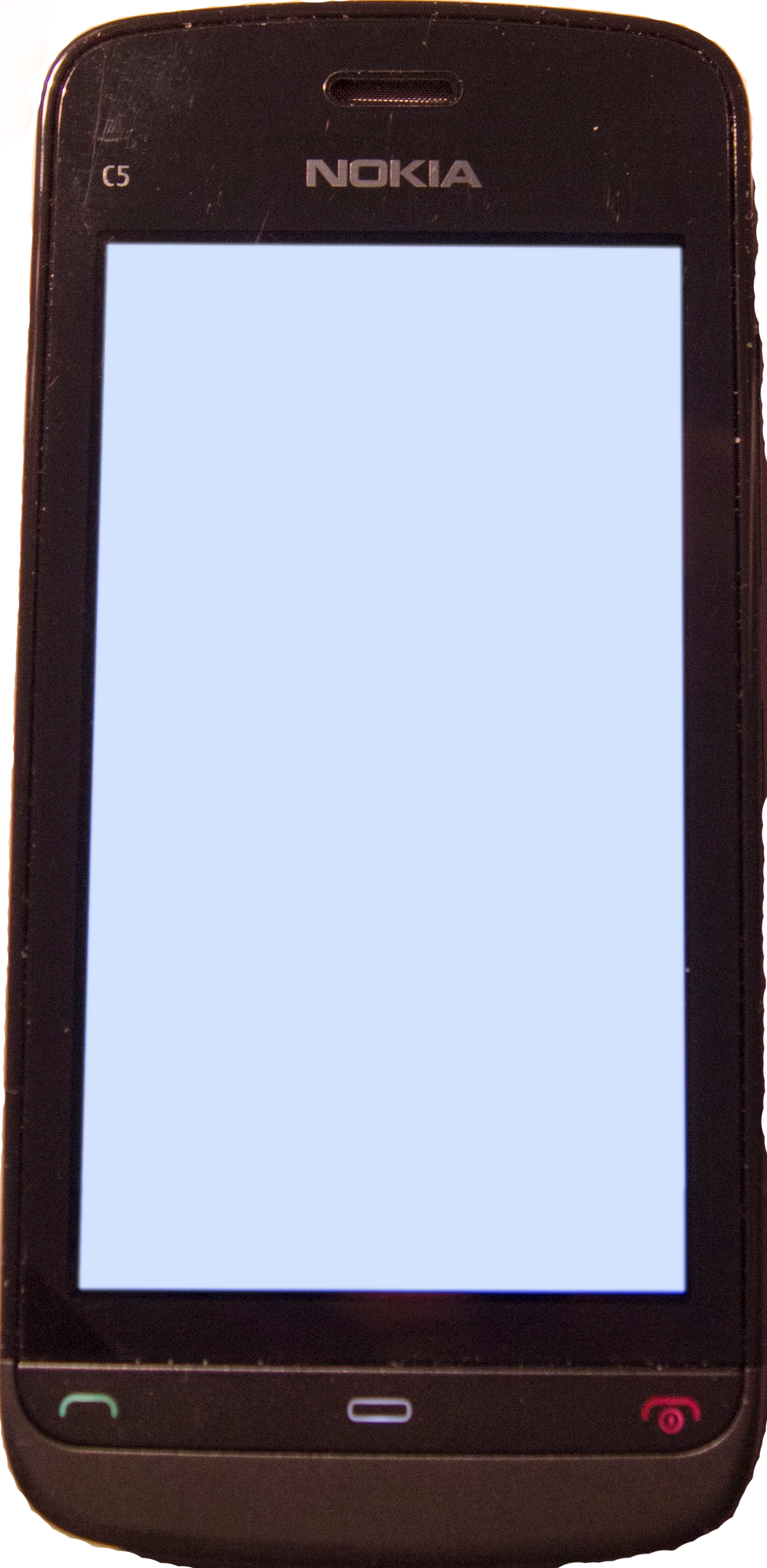
- Manufacturer: Nokia
- Availability by region: December 2010
- Predecessor: Nokia 5230; Nokia 5233; Nokia 5250
- Successor: Nokia 500; Nokia Asha 311
- Related: Nokia 5800, Nokia C6-01
- Compatible networks: GSM, EGPRS, WCDMA, HSDPA, A-GPS
- Form factor: Candybar
- Dimensions: 105.8×51×13.8 mm (4.17×2.01×0.54 in)
- Weight: 93 g (3 oz)
- Operating system: Symbian OS 9.4 + S60 platform 5th Edition (s60v5) (the newer Symbian3 OS was already available when the mobile was announced in October 2010)
- CPU: ARM11 @ 600 Mhz
- Memory: 40 MB User Storage, 128 MB SDRAM, 256 MB NAND
- Removable storage: max. 16 GB microSDHC (32 GB unofficial), 8 GB card included
- Battery: BL-4U (3.7V 1000mAh); 2 mm charging connector
- Rear camera: 5.0 Megapixels, Video resolution: 640x352, 15fps
- Front camera: No dual camera
- Display: nHD 640 x 360 pixels, 3.2 inch 16:9 widescreen, (16.7 million colours) transmissive LCD technology
- Media: AAC, AAC+, eAAC+, MP3, MP4 (MPEG-4 Part 2 VGA / H.264 QVGA), M4A, WMA, AMR-NB, AMR-WB, Mobile XMF, SP-MIDI, MIDI Tones (poly 64), RealAudio 7,8,10, True tones, WAV, but not Ogg files.
- Connectivity: Bluetooth 2.0 (EDR/A2DP), WLAN (802.11 b/g), MicroUSB 2.0; 3.5 mm headphone and video-out jack
- Data inputs: Touchscreen with Nokia Dynamic Intelligent Layouts, accelerometer

The Nokia C5-03 is a budget smartphone from Nokia, part of the Cseries range that was announced in October and released in December 2010. It runs on Symbian OS 9.4, and is the successor of the Nokia 5230, having an identical design and similar hardware specifications.

== Hardware ==
CPU	600 MHz ARM11 processor (ARM v6 architecture)
Storage	40 MB storage, 128 MB RAM

Technical Specs
Developer Platform	S60 5th Edition
Operating System	Symbian OS v9.4
Screen Resolution	360 x 640 pixels
Development Frameworks	Qt,^{[1]} Web Runtime, Java, Symbian C++, Flash, Open C/C++
Screen Resolution	360 x 640 pixels
Screen Color Depth	24 bits
Screen Size	3.2 inches
Display Technology	LCD transmissive
Device Size	105.8 x 51 x 13.8 mm
Volume	65 cc
Weight	93 g
Display Touch Technology	Resistive Single-Touch
Input Method	Touch Screen
Other Keys	Call Creation Key, Call Termination Key, Lock Switch, Menu Key, Volume Keys
Frequency Bands	GSM 1800, GSM 1900, GSM 850, GSM 900, WCDMA Band I (2100), WCDMA Band II (1900), WCDMA Band VIII (900)
Data Bearers	Dual Transfer Mode (MSC 32), EDGE Class B, GPRS, HSDPA Cat9 10.2 Mbit/s, HSUPA Cat5 2.0 Mbit/s, WLAN IEEE 802.11 b/g
Regional Availability	Brazil, China, Eurasia, Europe, India, Latin America, Middle East, North America, SEAP
CPU Count	Single CPU
CPU Type	ARM 11
CPU Clock Rate	600 MHz
Notes	^{1} Qt content can be published to Ovi Store.
Extra Features	Accelerometer sensor, Flight Mode, Firmware over the Air (FOTA), Nokia Maps 3.0, Nokia Music, Nokia Store, Ovi Contacts, software updates, themes
Positioning	A-GPS, GPS
