= Nokia Asha 500 =

Smartphone model

- Manufacturer: Nokia
- Series: Asha Full Touch
- Availability by region: Global
- Compatible networks: Quad-band GSM: 850, 900, 1800, 1900 MHz
- Form factor: Full Touch monoblock
- Dimensions: Width: 58.1 mm; Height: 100.3 mm; Thickness: 12.8 mm
- Weight: 101 g (4 oz)
- Operating system: Nokia Asha software platform 1.1.1
- CPU: Single core
- Memory: 64 MB RAM
- Storage: 4 GB microSD card (included)
- Removable storage: microSD, supports up to 32 GB
- Battery: BL-4U 1200 mAh, removable: Standby: 35 days; Talk time: 14 hours; Music playback: 14 h
- Rear camera: 2 Mpix, 1600×1200 pixels, Fixed focus, 50 cm to infinity Formats: JPEG, RAW10
- Display: 2.8" HighColor QVGA; 240×320 px (portrait mode; 3:4 or 4:3 aspect ratio), 18-bit/262,000 colors, 142 ppi pixel density
- Sound: 3.5 mm audio connector, hands-free speaker, stereo FM radio, music player, Nokia Stereo Headset WH-108
- Connectivity: GPRS, EDGE; Wi-Fi 802.11 b/g/n; Bluetooth 3.0 with Slam, supported profiles: OPP 1.1, HFP 1.6, HSP 1.1, AVRCP 1.3, PBAP 1.0, A2DP 1.2, DUN, FTP; USB 2.0 High Speed via MicroUSB, USB mass storage
- Data inputs: Capacitive multipoint touch display
- Development status: Discontinued
- Other: Micro-SIM; Accelerometer; Proximity sensor USB charging
- Website: Nokia Asha 500

Nokia Asha 500 is a low-end smartphone from the Nokia Asha series announced on 22 October 2013 by Nokia in Abu Dhabi. The device is built on the Nokia Asha software platform based on technology originally developed from Series 40 and Smarterphone.

Nokia Asha 500 Dual SIM is the dual-SIM variant of the model. Specifications mostly differ in battery life and weight.

Asha 500 is one of a new generation of Asha phones produced for the low-cost market segment and emerging markets, and is the most affordable of the Asha 50x series, with a suggested price of U.S. $69 before taxes and subsidies.

The device does not support 3G for mobile data and relies instead on EDGE/EGPRS. For general Internet activities, the device connects over 802.11 b/g/n Wi-Fi.

== Software ==
The Nokia Nearby application offers navigation and location-based functionality, which peruses cellular and Wi-Fi network positioning technology. Built-in social apps include Facebook, Twitter, Sina Weibo, Line, and WeChat. Asha 500 is the first of the Asha 50x series phones for which inclusion of WhatsApp is officially mentioned.

== See also ==
- Nokia Asha 501
