= Nokia Asha 205 =

Mobile phone developed by Nokia

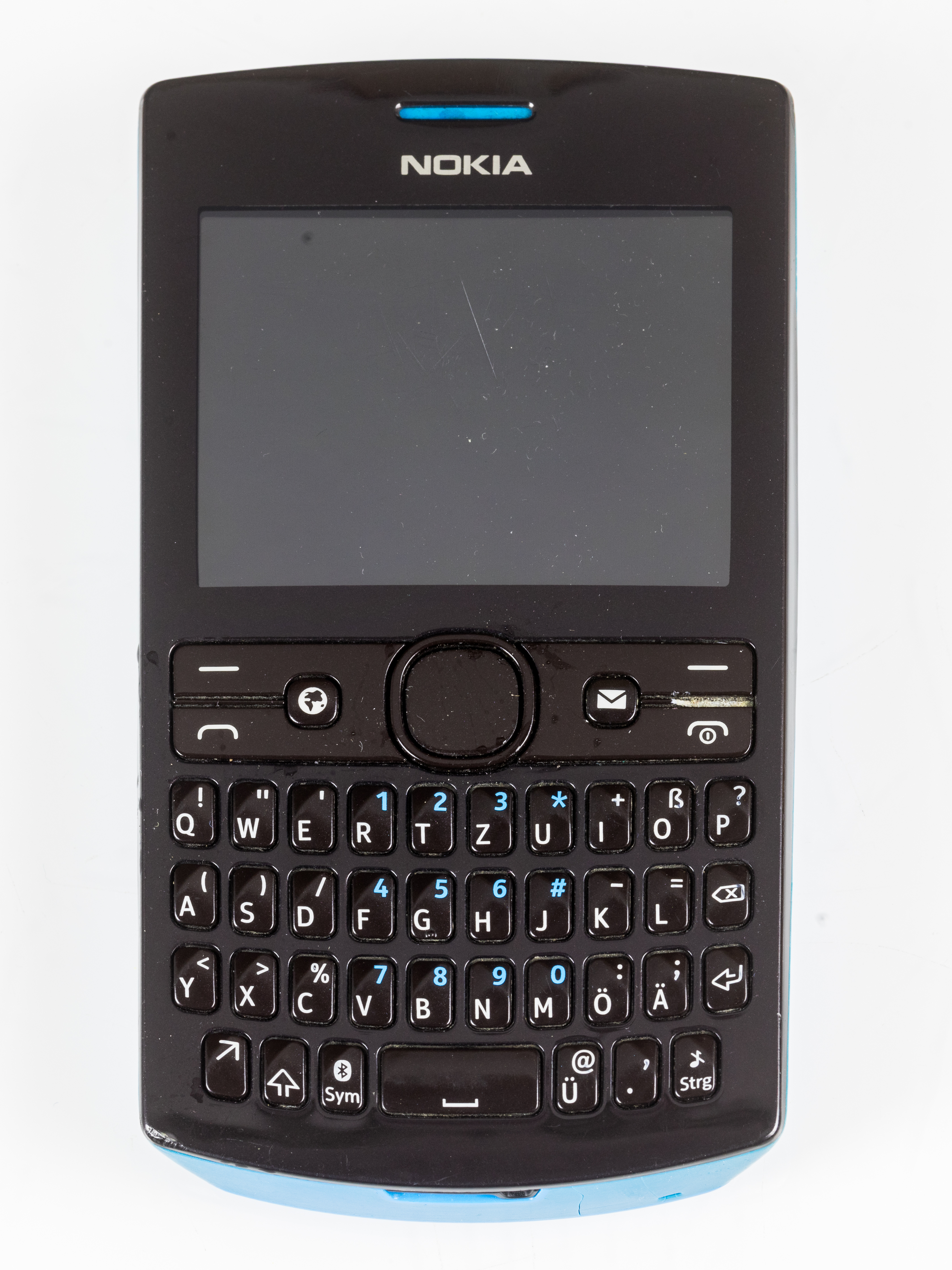
- Manufacturer: Nokia
- Availability by region: Global
- Predecessor: Nokia Asha 200/201
- Successor: Nokia Asha 310
- Form factor: QWERTY
- Operating system: Nokia Series 40
- Rear camera: VGA
- Display: 2.4 inch TFT

Nokia Asha 205 is a mobile phone from Nokia part of the Asha family. It is a full QWERTY device with a dedicated physical Facebook button, similar to the HTC ChaCha. It was announced alongside the Nokia 206 in November 2012 and was released in March 2013. The Nokia Asha 205 was succeeded by the Nokia Asha 310.

== See also ==
- List of Nokia products
