= Nokia Asha platform =

Mobile operating system

Asha platform

- Main menu interface of the Asha platform
- Developer: Microsoft Mobile Oy (originally Nokia)
- OS family: Mobile operating system
- Working state: Discontinued
- Source model: Closed source
- Initial release: 9 May 2013
- Final release: Asha Platform 1.4.0.6
- Marketing target: Entry-level smartphones
- Available in: Multi-lingual
- Package manager: .jad
- Supported platforms: ARM
- Kernel type: unknown, descendant of Series 40
- Default user interface: Nokia Fastlane, Swipe
- Official website: Nokia Asha — Platform overview

Support status
- Unsupported

The Nokia Asha platform is a discontinued mobile operating system (OS) and computing platform designed for low-end borderline smartphones, The Asha platform was active from 2013 and 2014 and replaced Series 40 on Nokia's low-end touchscreen devices in the Nokia Asha series. It inherits UI similarities mostly from MeeGo "Harmattan". The user interface design team was headed by Peter Skillman, who had worked previously on webOS and the design of MeeGo for the Nokia N9.

The first phone based on the platform was the Nokia Asha 501, followed by the Asha 500, Asha 502 Dual SIM, and Asha 503, all announced at Nokia World in October 2013. Another phone, the Nokia Asha 230 was announced on 24 February 2014, and came pre-installed with Asha platform 1.4.

== History ==
The Nokia Asha platform was built on software from Smarterphone, which was acquired by Nokia. It was the successor to the Meltemi project which Nokia was developing as a Linux platform to replace Series 40, but was cancelled in July 2012.

The platform was supplemented by the Nokia X software platform, Nokia's customised version of Android, seen on the Nokia X, which draws cues from the Asha platform, including the Fastlane notification centre.

In a company memo released in July 2014, Microsoft announced that as part of cutbacks, they would cease all development of the Asha, Series 40, and X ranges, in favor of solely producing and encouraging the use of Lumia Windows Phone products.

=== Meltemi ===
A much rumoured project, "Meltemi" was the codename of a new Linux-based operating system for low-end handsets. This was first reported in June 2011, during the N9's announcement and before the Lumia's debut. Nokia CEO Stephen Elop also reportedly referenced the Meltemi name as well as "Clipper".

It was reported in June 2012 that the Meltemi project was cancelled. Reasons have been variously reported due to restructuring efforts, focusing on Series 40 Asha devices, fundings, or the start of a new project that would become the Asha platform. An insider's report claimed that a device running Meltemi OS was almost ready before it was cancelled.

In December 2014, pictures of a working Meltemi prototype device were leaked on the internet. The interface is clearly based on that of MeeGo Harmattan on the N9.

In the book Operation Elop, the authors called the Meltemi project "one of the biggest secrets during Elop's era at Nokia", a project Nokia never officially confirmed existed. The authors further explain that Meltemi originated as a research project in 2010 under then-CEO Olli-Pekka Kallasvuo; that "Clipper" was to be a device sibling to the Nokia Lumia 610; that a tablet device for developing markets was planned; and that it was part of the company's "Next Billion" programme, much like what the Asha platform would become. In addition in June 2012 it was announced that a Nokia R&D centre in Ulm, Germany, where apparently much development took place, would close down in cuts. The book states that the main reason of Meltemi's cancellation was that the costs of bringing it to market would have hit the company's cash assets too hard, at a time when they were already financially struggling.

== Features ==
Apps for the platform were either made using Java ME, or as web apps, which are rendered by the Nokia Xpress browser which uses the Gecko rendering engine. The mobile operating system lacks true multitasking but the radio and music app can run in background mode (which is advertised as multitasking), while swiping to fastlane apps will actually close down previously opened applications instead of minimising them.

It features a notification centre, named Fastlane, which is accessible by swiping to the left of the home screen.

== Market competitors ==
The Asha Platform's main competition was Firefox OS, and Samsung's Java-based REX platform; both of which were also optimised for low-end handsets. Furthermore, entry-level Android handsets were also competition to the platform.

== Reception ==
The Verge commented that the platform may be a recognition on the part of Nokia that they are unable to move Windows Phone into the bottom end of smartphone devices and may be "hedging their commitment" to the Windows Phone platform.

== Version history ==
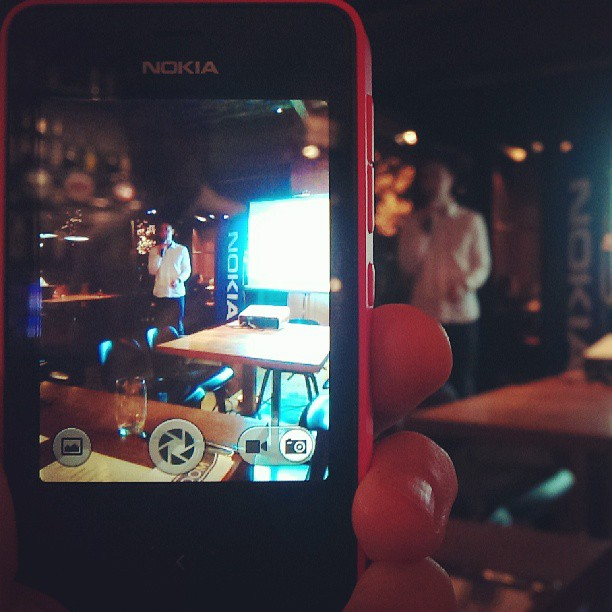
Camera app

=== Asha Platform 1.0 ===
Java APIs: HERE API, Nokia Gesture API, Nokia Frame Animator API,

File Selection API, Image Scaling API, Network State API, Contact API, Phone Settings API,

JSR 172 (Web Services), JSR 177 (Security and Trust), JSR 179 (Location), JSR 211 (Content Handler), JSR 234 (Multimedia Supplements), JSR 256 (Mobile Sensor API), JSR-238 (Mobile Internationalization), JSR 75 (File and PIM), JSR 82 (Bluetooth), JSR 118 (MIDP 2.1), JSR 135 (Mobile Media), JSR 139 (CLDC 1.1), JSR 184 (3D Graphics), JSR 205 (Messaging), JSR 226 (Vector Graphics),

Supported models: Nokia Asha 501

=== Asha Platform 1.1 ===
Features (new compared to 1.0): WhatsApp, video capture and sharing tools, Microsoft Exchange ActiveSync, VoIP and social network integrations for the Fastlane interface.

Java APIs (new compared to 1.0): Share API, VoIP API

Supported models: Asha 500, Asha 502 Dual SIM and Nokia Asha 501 with a firmware update to 11.1.1

=== Asha Platform 1.2 ===
Features (new compared to 1.1): 3G

Java APIs (new compared to 1.1): none

Supported models: Asha 503
