= Nokia Asha 502 =

2013 Nokia handset

- Also known as: Nokia Asha 502 Dual SIM
- Brand: Nokia
- Manufacturer: Nokia
- Type: Smartphone
- Series: Nokia Asha series
- First released: October 22, 2013
- Availability by region: List: Africa; Asia-Pacific; Europe; Middle East; Philippines
- Colors: Black, Yellow, Green, Blue, Red, White
- Dimensions: 99.6 mm (3.92 in) H 59.5 mm (2.34 in) W 11.1 mm (0.44 in) D
- Weight: 100 g (3.5 oz)
- Operating system: Nokia Asha software platform 1.1.1; Upgradable to 1.4
- Storage: 0.06 GB (64 MB) RAM
- Removable storage: microSDHC up to 32 GB
- SIM: Dual SIM (Micro-SIM)
- Battery: 1010 mAh Li-ion
- Rear camera: 5 MP, f/2.4, LED flash Video: QVGA @ 15 fps
- Display: 3.0 in (76 mm) TFT; Resolution: 320 x 240 pixels (133 ppi)
- Connectivity: Bluetooth 3.0, Wi-Fi 802.11 b/g/n, USB 2.0 (microUSB)
- Data inputs: Accelerometer, Proximity sensor

The Nokia Asha 502 is a touchscreen handset device that was manufactured by Nokia. it was released in November 2013 at Nokia World in Abu Dhabi along with Asha 500, 502, and 503, followed by the Philippines in December 2013.

The Nokia Asha 502 features Easy Swap Dual SIM for simultaneous cards. In terms of design, it also has a "crystal" look from polycarbonate materials.

== Specifications ==
- 64MB of internal storage, expandable up to 32GB via microSD cards
- 5-megapixel camera
- Dual-SIM
- 3-inch TFT display
- Nokia Asha platform 1.1.1 mobile operating system
- 1010 mAh lithium-polymer battery
