= Nokia Asha 305 =

Mobile phone developed by Nokia

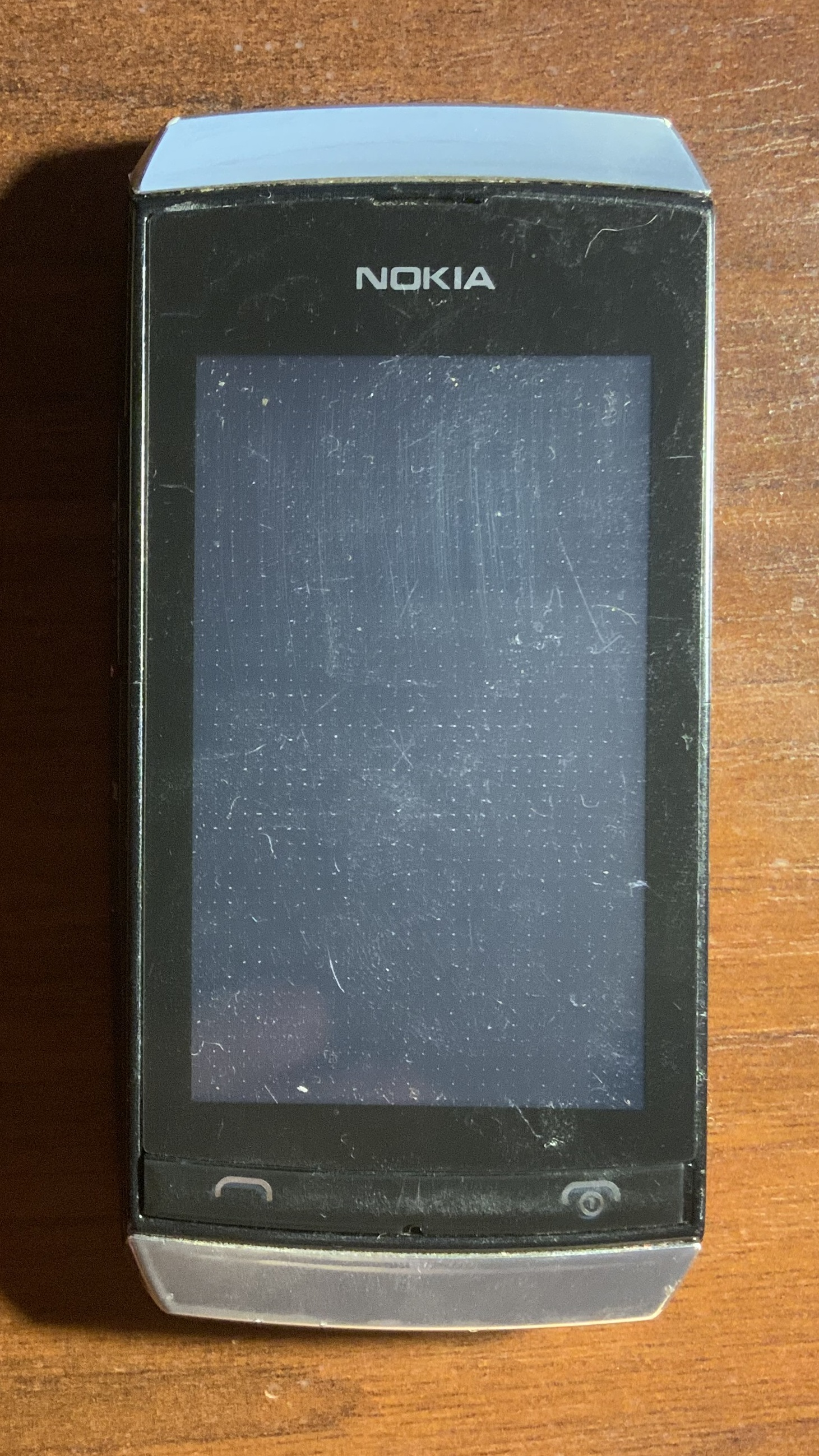
- Nokia Asha 305 in silver
- Manufacturer: Nokia
- Series: Full Touch
- Availability by region: Global
- Predecessor: Nokia C2-02
- Compatible networks: GSM 900 / 1800; GPRS/EDGE class B, multislot class 33
- Form factor: Full Touch candybar
- Dimensions: Width: 53.8 mm; Height: 110.3 mm; Thickness: 12.8 mm
- Weight: 96 g (3 oz)
- Operating system: Nokia Asha Series 40 OS
- Memory: 32 MB RAM; 64 MB ROM
- Storage: 10 Mb maximum user storage
- Removable storage: Up to 32 GB microSDHC; 2 Gb memory card included
- Battery: Removable, model BP-4U, Li-Ion 1100 mAh; microUSB and 2 mm DC plug charging; Talk time: Up to 14 hours; Standby: 528 h (22 days); Music playback: 40 hours
- Rear camera: 2 MPix (CMOS sensor) EDoF, 1600x1200 px; Focus range 100 cm–∞
- Display: 240 × 400 px (WQVGA), 3.0" (155 ppi), 16 bits
- Connectivity: Bluetooth 2.1 +EDR; microUSB 2.0; USB On-the-Go 1.3; 3.5 mm AV connector (audio in/out); mini-SIM; FM receiver with RDS
- Data inputs: Resistive multipoint-touch display; External functional hardware keys
- Development status: Shipping

The Nokia Asha 305 is a "Full Touch" phone powered by Nokia's Series 40 operating system. It was announced at Bangkok by Nokia along with two other Asha Full Touch phones - the Nokia Asha 306 and 311. Its main features are the Full Touch resistive touchscreen and dual SIM.

== History and availability ==
The Nokia Asha 305 was announced at Bangkok by Nokia, and the announcement offered global availability from 3Q of 2012. The phone's suggested price was €63 subject to taxes and subsidies.

== Hardware ==
=== Screen and input ===
The Nokia Asha 305 has a 3.0-inch resistive touchscreen (multi point) with a resolution of 240 x 400 pixels (QVGA). According to Nokia, it is capable of displaying up to 65 thousand colors.

The back camera has an extended depth of field feature (no mechanical zoom), no flash and has a 4× digital zoom for both video and camera. The sensor size of the back camera is 2-megapixel, has a f/2.8 aperture and a 50 centimeters (20 inches) to infinity focus range. It is capable of video recording at up to 176 x 144 px at 10 fps with mono sound.

=== Buttons ===
On the front of the device, there are the answer/call keys, on the right side of the device there are the volume rockers and the lock/unlock button.

=== Battery and SIM ===
The battery life of the BP-4U (1100 mAh) as claimed by Nokia is 14 hours of talk time, from 528 hours of standby and 40 hours of music playback depending on actual usage.

The main SIM card is located under the battery, which can be accessed by removing the back panel of the device. No tool is necessary to remove the back panel. A second SIM card slot (hot swappable) is located in the edge of the phone.

=== Storage ===
Located on the left side of the phone below the SIM2 socket, additional storage is available via a hot swappable microSDHC card socket, which is certified to support up to 32 GB of additional storage.

== Software ==
The Nokia Asha 305 is powered by Nokia Series 40 Full Touch operating system and comes with a variety of applications:

- Web: Nokia (proxy) Browser for Series 40
- Conversations: Nokia Messaging Service 3.2 (instant messaging and e-mail) and SMS, MMS
- Social: Facebook, Twitter, Flickr, and Orkut
- Media: Camera, photos, music player, Nokia Music Store (on selected market), Flash Lite 3.0 (for YouTube videos), video player, Music Mania
- Personal Information Management: Calendar, detailed contact information
- Utilities: Notes, calculator, to-do list, alarm clock, voice recorder, stopwatch

The device comes with Nokia Maps for Series 40 and make use of cellular network for positioning as there is no GPS in the phone. Nokia Maps for Series 40 phones does not provide voice guided navigation and only allows for basic routes of less than 10 kilometers (6.2 miles) to be planned. The software provides step-by-step instructions, allows the user to see the route on a map and search for nearby points of interest. Depending on where the phone was purchased, regional maps (Europe, South America, etc.) are preloaded and, as such, an active internet connection to download map data is not required.

== HMD Asha 305 ==
In 2026, HMD Global announced a revival of the phone called HMD Asha 305. Compared to the original Nokia Asha 305, the HMD Asha 305 have several differences such as featured three lens camera design similar to IPhone series, a 5.0-inch resistive touchscreen, increased RAM storage to 2GB, 4G and Wi-Fi supports, using Unisoc chip and run Pulse OS based Android 11 instead of Nokia Series 40 Full Touch operating system.

== See also ==
- List of Nokia products
