= Nokia 5250 =

Cell phone model

- Manufacturer: Nokia
- Availability by region: 23 August 2010
- Predecessor: Nokia 5230
- Successor: Nokia C5-03
- Compatible networks: GSM/EDGE 850/900/1800/1900
- Form factor: Candybar, Touchscreen
- Dimensions: 105×50×14.5 mm (4.13×1.97×0.57 in)
- Weight: 107 g (4 oz)
- Operating system: Symbian OS v9.4 S60v5
- CPU: Single CPU, 434 MHz ARM11
- Memory: 128 MB SDRAM, 256 MB NAND, 51 MB Internal User Storage
- Removable storage: microSD memory card slot, with hot swap max. 16 GB
- Battery: BL-4U 3.7V 1000mAh mAh Li-Ion standard battery
- Rear camera: 2 megapixels (1600 x 1200)
- Display: 2.8 inches 640 x 360 nHD with 16:9 picture touchscreen LCD (16.7 million colours)
- Connectivity: Micro-USB connector, USB 2.0 high speed, 3.5 mm Nokia AV connector, Bluetooth version 2.0 with A2DP and AVRCP
- Data inputs: Touchscreen, Dedicated keys for camera, volume, power, send & end, and (menu), Voice commands, Accelerometer
- Development status: Discontinued

The Nokia 5250 is a budget Nokia resistive touchscreen smartphone running on Symbian v9.4 operating system with a S60 5th Edition user interface. Its price before tax and subsidies is €115. It was announced in August 2010. It was available in China, Eurasia, Europe, India, Latin America, Middle East, and South-East Asia and the Pacific Region. It is very small and compact. It comes preloaded with Guitar Hero Mobile series 5.

== Reception ==
CNET Asia praised the resolution for the budget price, but criticized the lack of 3G capabilities, relying only on GSM and EDGE.
