= Nokia Asha 310 =

Mobile phone model

- Availability by region: Global
- Predecessor: Nokia Asha 205
- Compatible networks: GSM 900 / 1800
- Dimensions: • Width: 54 mm • Height: 109.9 mm • Thickness: 13.2 mm
- Weight: 104 g
- Operating system: Nokia Asha Series 40 OS
- Memory: • 64 MB RAM • 128 MB ROM
- Removable storage: up to 32 GB microSD card
- Battery: BL-4U 1100 mAh Li ion battery (removable); Charging with micro-USB and 2 mm DC plug
- Rear camera: 2.0 MP
- Front camera: No
- Display: 240 × 400 px (WQVGA), 3.0-inch, 16 bits
- Connectivity: WLAN IEEE 802.11 b/g/n; Bluetooth 3.0 A2DP; micro-USB 2.0; 3.5 mm Nokia AV connector (audio in/out); SIM card - Dual SIM; FM receiver with RDS
- Data inputs: Capacitive multi-point touch display; External functional hardware keys
- Development status: Available

The Nokia Asha 310, also known as the Nokia Asha 310 or the Nokia ASHA 310 RM-911, was released in March 2013. It is the first in the line of the Asha range of phones to have dual subscriber identity module (SIM) slots and Wi-Fi connectivity. It was a reinvention of the Asha range to remain competitive with new Android devices. It cost $102.00 at its launch date. It has a touchscreen, comes with either a 2 or 4 GB microSD card, and has 64 MB of RAM, a 2.0 MP camera and a battery that can last up to 600 hours in standby mode. The phone can play music for up to 54 hours or video for up to 9.5 hours, and has a maximum of 17 hours talk time (2G).

== Dual SIM ==
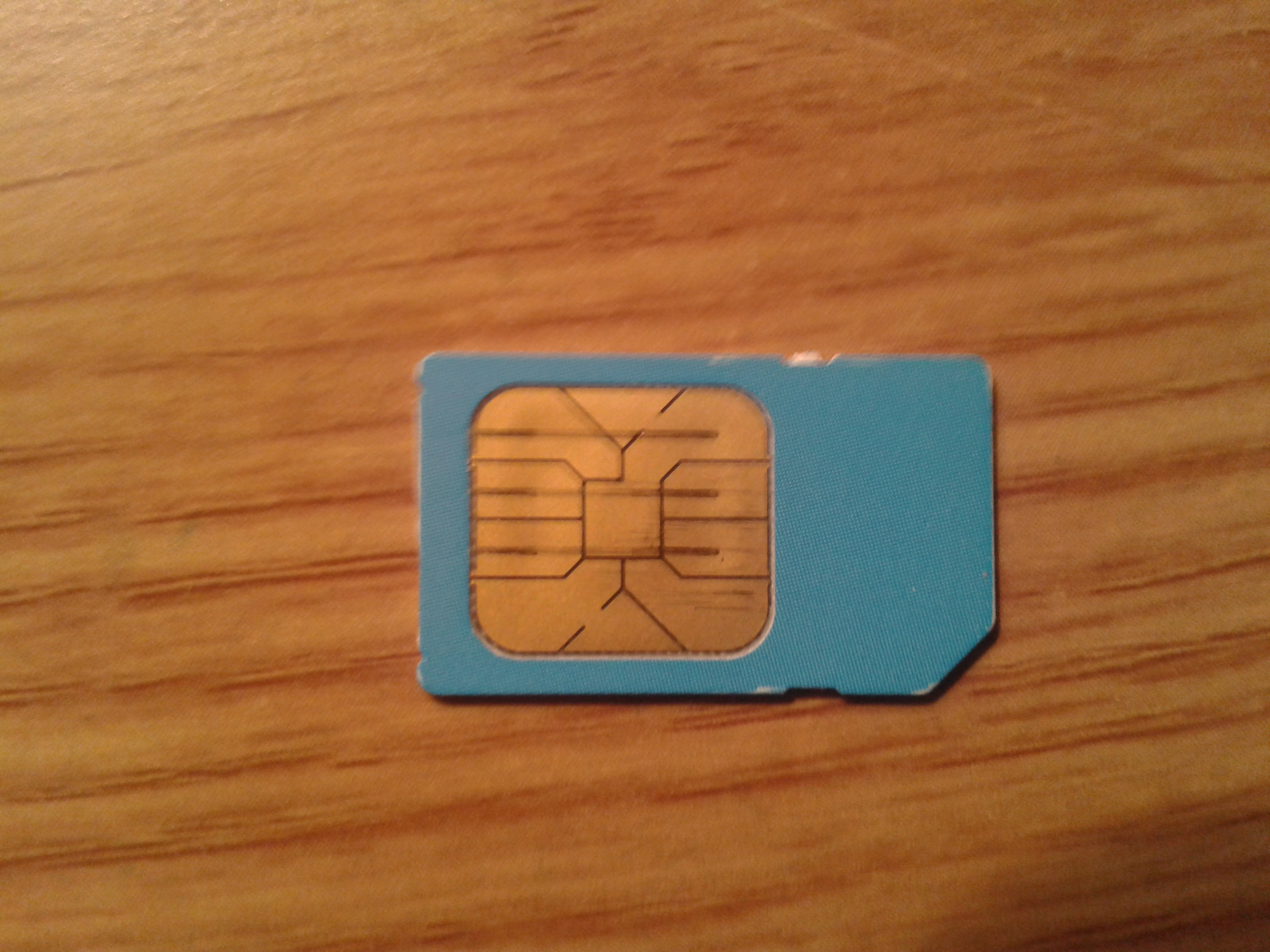
A SIM card

The phone has two regular SIM card slots on the left side of the phone. It has a feature called "Easy Swap" that allows up to five SIM cards to be swapped without turning the phone off whilst the default SIM is located below the battery.

== Critical reception ==
Despite being a low-end phone, it has been reported as being well built in terms of the external appearance. It has been reported that the phone has poor quality in the ear piece and that its camera produces. It has been reported that due to the Nokia Asha's 310s small 3-inch display that the on-screen keyboard is difficult to use so the keypad should be used as opposed to its QWERTY configuration. Despite its low hardware specifications, the Nokia Asha 310 has been said to still run at a reasonable speed. Browsing the Web on the phone is said to be ’choppy’ whilst navigating web pages, making it only good for simple tasks as opposed to anything major such as streaming a video file.

== Operating system ==
The Nokia Asha 310 uses the Series 40 operating system, often shortened to S40. It is used on the Vertu line of phones. The S40 has more features than its predecessor, the S30. It is not used for smartphones; Nokia normally used the Windows Phone OS for those. It is an embedded software system that allows for software development supporting Java MIDlets. It has an integrated web browser based on the WebKit open source components WebCore and JavaScriptCore. User-installed applications on Series 40 are generally mobile Java applications.

== Maps and navigation ==
The Nokia Asha 310 comes with cellular and Wi-Fi positioning, allowing the phone's location to be pinpointed on a map. It also comes with the application Nokia Maps pre-installed, allowing the user to plan their journey and search for different locations. However, only the map of the user's region can be preloaded for viewing whilst offline.

== Interface ==
The Nokia Asha 310 has a lock-screen that shows the date and time, connectivity status, app shortcuts, a notification bar, a back button, and menu keys. Swiping either left or right will switch between the homescreen, the app drawer and the dialler. The notification bar allows the user to access the call functions as well as messaging, content player apps, Wi-Fi and Bluetooth toggles and sound options. Pre-installed apps include Facebook, Twitter, eBuddy and a SIM Card Manager which allows you to set the default network or be given a choice of networks every time the SIM card is used to perform an action.

== Camera ==
The Nokia Asha's camera is fixed-focus, can take photos of 2 MP quality and has the option of a 4× digital zoom. It has a focal length of 35 mm and a minimum focusing range of 60 cm. Camera features include: Auto and manual white balance, centre weighted auto exposure, exposure compensation, full screen viewfinder, landscape orientation and still image editor.

== Video recording ==
The Nokia asha 310's rear camera video resolution is QCIF (176 × 144) and has a video frame rate of 10 fps (frames per second). One of the features of the video camera is that it gives the user the option of a 4× digital zoom. Supported video recording formats are 3GP/H.263, MP4/MPEG-4.

== Video playback ==
The Nokia Asha 310 has a video playback rate of 15 fps (frames per second) and has the following video playback codecs: H.263, H.264/AVC, MPEG-4, VC-1, and Windows video. It has the video streaming options of Download and Play, and Real Time Video Streaming (RTSP).

== Device security ==
The Nokia Asha 310 contains many general security features: Device lock, PIN code and device lock password. The phone also contains the following Wi-Fi security modes: WPA (Wi-Fi Protected Access), WEP (Wired Equivalent Protection), WPA2 (AES/TKIP), WPA2-Personal, WPA-Personal.

== Environmental factors ==
The Nokia Asha is built upon many environmentally friendly factors. The phone itself is free of polyvinyl chloride (PVC), free of nickel (on the phone's surface), free of BFR, rFR as in NSL. The packaging is made up of renewable products; it contains up to 60% recycled materials. Packaging is minimized and the packaging is 100% recyclable. The Nokia Asha 310 has an energy-efficient feature built in: the phone will remind the user to unplug the charger when the phone is fully charged, to help save electricity.

== Call management ==
Types of calls that the Nokia Asha 310 offers are: Audio calls, conference calls and VoIP calls (Voice over IP). It contains many call features such as: Call waiting, call forwarding, Call logs: dialled, received and missed. The phone also includes noise cancelling technology.

== Keys and input methods ==
The main ways to input data into the Nokia Asha 310 are by using the touchscreen and by using the operating keys, such as the volume keys, lock key, call key and the power/end key.

== Sensors ==
The Nokia Asha contains an accelerometer sensor. An accelerometer is a device that measures proper acceleration ("g-force").

== Tools and productivity ==
The phone also contains a number of other tool that help with personal management, such as Personal information management features: Digital clock, recorder, calculator, clock, calendar, Notes, alarm clock, Reminders, Phonebook, To-do list, alarm clock with ringtones and a Dictionary. The phone also can sync with other devices using the sync type of: Remote SyncML synchronisation.

== Messaging features ==
The Nokia Asha 310 also contains the following messaging features: Instant messaging, Multiple SMS deletion, Text messaging, Automatic resizing of images for MMS, Multimedia messaging, Conversational chat style SMS, Unified inbox for SMS and MMS, Concatenated SMS for long messages, Number screening for messaging, Picture messaging.

== Connectivity ==
The Nokia Asha 310 has many connectivity features. It has Dual SIM, 3.5 mm Nokia AV connector, 2.0 mm charging connector, a Micro-USB, USB 2.0, Bluetooth 3.0, PhoneBook Access Profile (PBAP)1.1, SIM Access Profile (SAP), Serial Port profile (SPP), Service Discovery Application Profile (SDAP) and WLAN IEEE 802.11 b/g Wi-Fi. Its cellular connectivity features are GSM network: 900 MHz, 1800 MHz, GSM max data speed DL: EGPRS 236.8 kbit/s and GSM max data speed UL: GPRS 80 kbit/s

== Other applications ==
The Nokia Asha 310 comes with Facebook, Twitter, Foursquare and YouTube pre-installed. Facebook allows the user of the phone to keep in contact with friends and family. Twitter will allow the user to post tweets and view other tweets. Foursquare is a local search app that helps the phone user find destinations of interest. YouTube will allow the user to watch videos and entertainment.

The phone also comes with Java games pre-installed for the user's entertainment.

== See also ==
- List of Nokia products
