= Dual Transfer Mode =

Dual Transfer Mode (DTM) is a protocol based on the GSM standard that makes simultaneous transfer of Circuit switched (CS) voice and Packet switched (PS) data over the same radio channel (ARFCN) simpler. Without DTM, the mobile device must be capable of reception and transmission simultaneously (full-duplex) requiring complex and expensive circuitry in the mobile terminal. With DTM this requirement doesn't exist and makes the device implementation simpler and cheaper. DTM is a 3GPP feature introduced in R4 of the specification series.

Traditionally, GSM/EDGE device with simultaneous CS/PS capability was supported, but only for Class A GPRS devices. Due to the fact that the uplink and downlink timeslot usage was not co-ordinated between the voice and data connections, the class A devices in practice had to be capable of transmit and reception simultaneously. With DTM, a mobile phone capable can be engaged in both CS and PS call and simultaneous voice and packet data connection in GSM/EDGE networks with the lower Class B requirements thus having a simpler half duplex circuitry due to co-ordination of the timeslot allocations in uplink and downlink for both voice and data. Older devices in Class B without DTM capability could still receive CS calls while having an active PS session. With these devices, the PS connection is put on hold (i.e. no traffic) for the duration of the voice call. After the voice call terminates, the data connection resumes data transfer.

One common class implemented by mobile phone vendors is the DTM Multislot Class 11. For example, the technical specification of Nokia N95 states a speed of DL/UL 177.6/118.4 kbit/s. In 2010, devices with DTM multislot class 32 such as Nokia N900 are available.

A simultaneous voice and data call implies that a data call might start on an ongoing voice call or a voice call might start on an ongoing data call.

In case a voice is started on a mobile phone that is in Packet Transfer Mode(i.e. in a data call), the procedure takes place in three stages. The TBF's (Data "Call") are released. A dedicated connection for the voice call is initiated. Finally, the mobile phone uses DTM for re-establishing the data connection.

3GPP Release 6 specifies the Enhanced DTM CS Establishment and Enhanced DTM CS Release procedures to enable smooth transitions between the packet transfer and dual transfer modes, without having to release the TBF's. This enables continuous data transfer also when calls are set up and released, as well as reduced load on the common control channels of the GSM network.

Starting late 2009 or early 2010, Vodafone has added DTM support in its network in the UK. In addition to enabling simultaneous call and data transfer in 2G network, DTM -capable network can also secure that incoming calls are received by devices that are transferring packet data (depending on the network implementation, this can also apply to devices that do not support the DTM feature).
