= Nokia Asha 302 =

Mobile phone developed by Nokia

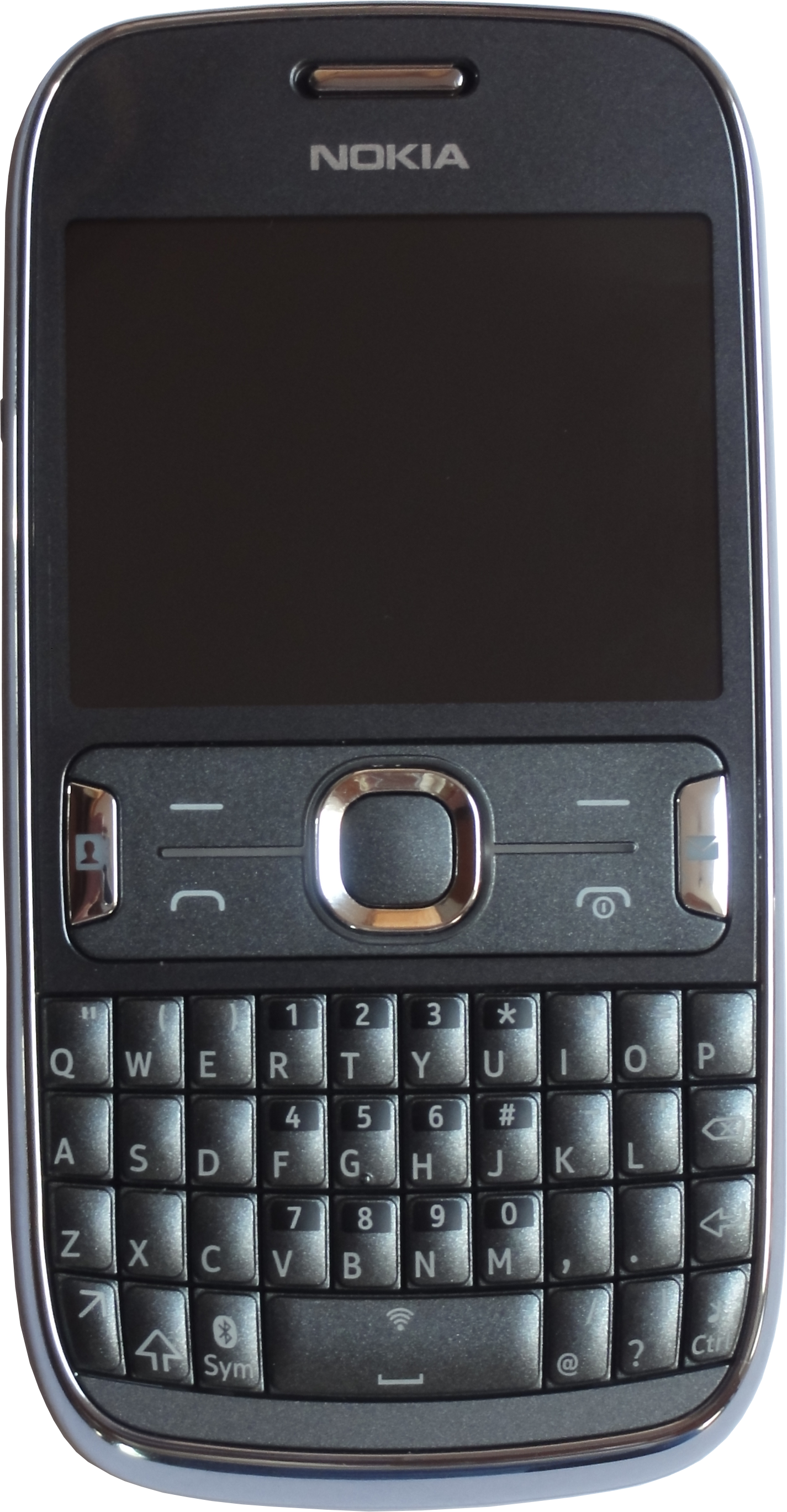
- Manufacturer: Nokia
- Series: Nokia Asha series
- Availability by region: March 2012(Global)
- Predecessor: Nokia C3-00
- Related: Nokia Asha 200/201
- Compatible networks: GSM 850 / 900 / 1800 / 1900; GPRS/EDGE class B, multislot class 33; UMTS 850 / 900 / 1700 / 1900 / 2100; HSDPA Cat10, 14.4 Mbps; HSUPA Cat5 2.0 Mbps
- Form factor: Qwerty candybar
- Dimensions: Width: 55.7 mm; Height: 116.5 mm; Thickness: 13.9 mm
- Weight: 99 g (3 oz)
- Operating system: Nokia Asha Series 40 OS
- CPU: 1 GHz ARM11
- Memory: 128 MB RAM; 256 MB ROM
- Storage: 170 MB internal NAND memory (100 MB available to end user)
- Removable storage: up to 32 GB microSDHC
- Battery: BL-5J 1430 mAh Li-Ion battery (removable); micro USB and 2 mm DC plug charging
- Rear camera: 3.2 MP (CMOS sensor) EDoF
- Front camera: No
- Display: transmissive LCD 320 x 240 px (QVGA), 2.4" (66 mm), 18 bits
- Connectivity: WLAN IEEE 802.11 b/g/n (2.4 GHz); bluetooth 2.1 +EDR; micro USB 2.0; USB On-the-Go 1.3; 3.5 mm AV connector (audio in/out); SIM card; FM receiver with RDS
- Data inputs: QWERTY keyboard; External functional hardware keys

The Nokia Asha 302 is a QWERTY messenger feature phone powered by Nokia's Series 40 operating system. It was announced at Mobile World Congress 2012 in Barcelona (on 26 February) along with other Asha phones - the Nokia Asha 202 and 203. The 302 is considered to be among the flagship of the Asha family, and serve as a non-touch version of the Asha 303. Its main features are the QWERTY keyboard, the pentaband 3G radio, SIP VoIP over 3G and Wi-Fi. Its design looks a lot like the older Nokia E6 with chrome slidings, giving it a somewhat premium look. A software update adds Mail for Exchange support.

== Hardware ==
=== Processors ===
The Nokia Asha 302 is powered by the same 1 GHz ARM11 processor found in some Symbian^3 phones such as the Nokia 500, 600 and 700 but lack the dedicated Broadcom GPU which is not supported by the Nokia Series 40 operating system. The system also has 128 MB of low power single channel RAM (Mobile DDR).

=== Screen and input ===
The Nokia Asha 302 has a 2.4-inch transmissive LCD screen with a resolution of 320 × 240 pixel. In contrast with the Nokia Asha 303, the screen of the Asha 302 is wider than taller. According to Nokia it is capable of displaying up to 262 thousands colors. The device also has a backlit 4-row keyboard with regional variant available (QWERTY, AZERTY, etc.).

The back camera has an extended depth of field (EDoF) feature (no mechanical zoom), no flash and has a 4× digital zoom for both video and camera. The sensor size of the back camera is 3.2-megapixel (2048 x 1536 px), has a f/2.8 aperture and a 50 cm to infinity focus range. It is capable of video recording at up to 640 x 480 px at 15 fps with mono sound.

=== Audio and output ===
The Nokia Asha 302 has one microphone and a loudspeaker, which is situated on the back of the device. On the top, there is a 3.5 mm AV connector which simultaneously provides stereo audio output and microphone input. Between the 3.5 mm AV connector and the 2 mm charging connector, there is a High-Speed USB 2.0 USB Micro AB connector provided for data synchronization, battery charging and support for USB On-The-Go 1.3 (the ability to act as a USB host) using a Nokia Adapter Cable for USB OTG CA-157 (not included upon purchase).

The built-in Bluetooth v2.1 +EDR (Enhanced Data Rate) supports stereo audio output with the A2DP profile. Built-in car hands-free kits are also supported with the HFP profile. File transfer is supported (FTP) along with the OPP profile for sending/receiving objects. It is possible to remote control the device with the AVRCP profile. It supports wireless earpieces and headphones through the HSP profile. The DUN profile which permits access to the Internet from a laptop by dialing up on a mobile phone wirelessly (tethering) and PAN profile for networking using Bluetooth are also supported. The device also functions as an FM receiver, allowing one to listen to the FM radio by using headphones connected to the 3.5 jack as antenna.

=== Battery and SIM ===
The battery life of the BL-5J (1430 mAh) as claimed by Nokia is from 6 to 9 hours of talk time, from 29 to 34 days of standby and 50 hours of music playback depending on actual usage.

The SIM card is located under the battery which can be accessed by removing the back panel of the device. The microSDHC card socket is also located under the back cover (but not under the battery). No tool is necessary to remove the back panel.

=== Storage ===
The phone has 150 MB of available non-removable storage. Additional storage is available via a hot swappable microSDHC card socket, which is certified to support up to 32 GB of additional storage. Document Viewer is not available.

== Software ==
The Nokia Asha 302 is powered by Nokia Series 40 operating system with service pack 1 and comes with a variety of applications:

- Web: Nokia (proxy) Browser for Series 40, Nokia Xpress
- Conversations: Nokia Messaging Service 3.2 (instant messaging and e-mail) and SMS, MMS
- Social: Facebook, Twitter, Flickr and Orkut
- Media: Camera, Photos, Music player, Nokia Music Store (on selected market), Flash Lite 3.0 (for YouTube video), Video player
- Personal Information Management: Calendar, Detailed contact information
- Utilities: VoIP, Notes, Calculator, To-do list, Alarm clock, Voice recorder, Stopwatch
- Games: "Bounce Tales", "Brick Breaker Revolution" (trial version), "Tower Bloxx New York" (trial version)

The Home screen is customizable and allow the user to add, amongst others, favorite contacts, Twitter/Facebook feeds, applications shortcuts, IM/e-mail notifications and calendar alert.

Document Viewer is not available. It also doesn't contain any HERE maps.

== See also ==
- List of Nokia products
