= Nokia X1-01 =

Mobile phone model

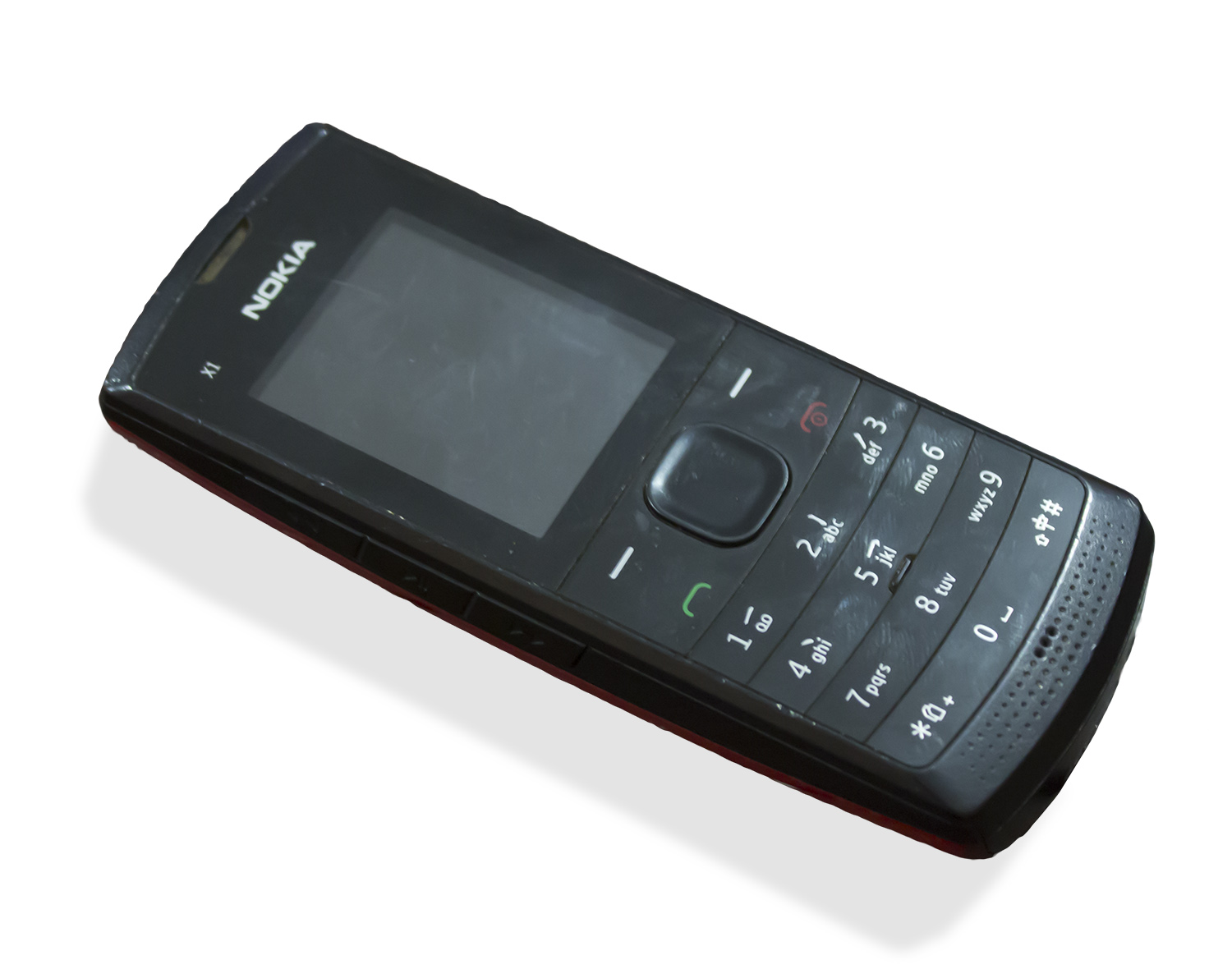
- Manufacturer: Nokia
- Type: Basic phone
- Series: Nokia Xseries
- First released: June 2011
- Related: Nokia C1-00
- Form factor: Bar
- Colors: Red, Dark Grey, Blue, Orange, White
- Dimensions: 112.2 mm × 47.3 mm × 16 mm (4.42 in × 1.86 in × 0.63 in)
- Weight: 91.1 g (3.21 oz)
- Removable storage: microSD, up to 16 GB
- Battery: 1320 mAh Li-ion, removable (Nokia BL-5J)
- Display: 1.8 in (4.6 cm) 128 x 160 px (~114 ppi pixel density) TFT with 65K colors
- Connectivity: 3.5 mm headphone jack; FM radio, Stereo
- Data inputs: Keypad
- Other: Built-in flashlight, MP3 player

The Nokia X1-01 is an ultra-basic phone manufactured by Nokia for users in developing countries. The phone was announced in May 2011 and released in June 2011. It is a dual SIM phone. The phone features 2G GSM mobile connectivity. However, it does not feature any internet connectivity, web browsing or social media capabilities, and apps cannot be installed by the user. It also does not have a camera, GPS, or Bluetooth hardware available.

The phone runs on Li-ion battery, which can last up to 43 days with the phone on standby.

The phone can play standard MP3 files with bitrate greater than 32 kilobits per second, with advertised 36 hours of battery life. It uses a microSD card for storage. It also runs FM radio and also has some games pre-installed.
