= Nokia C3-00 =

Mobile phone made by Nokia Corporation

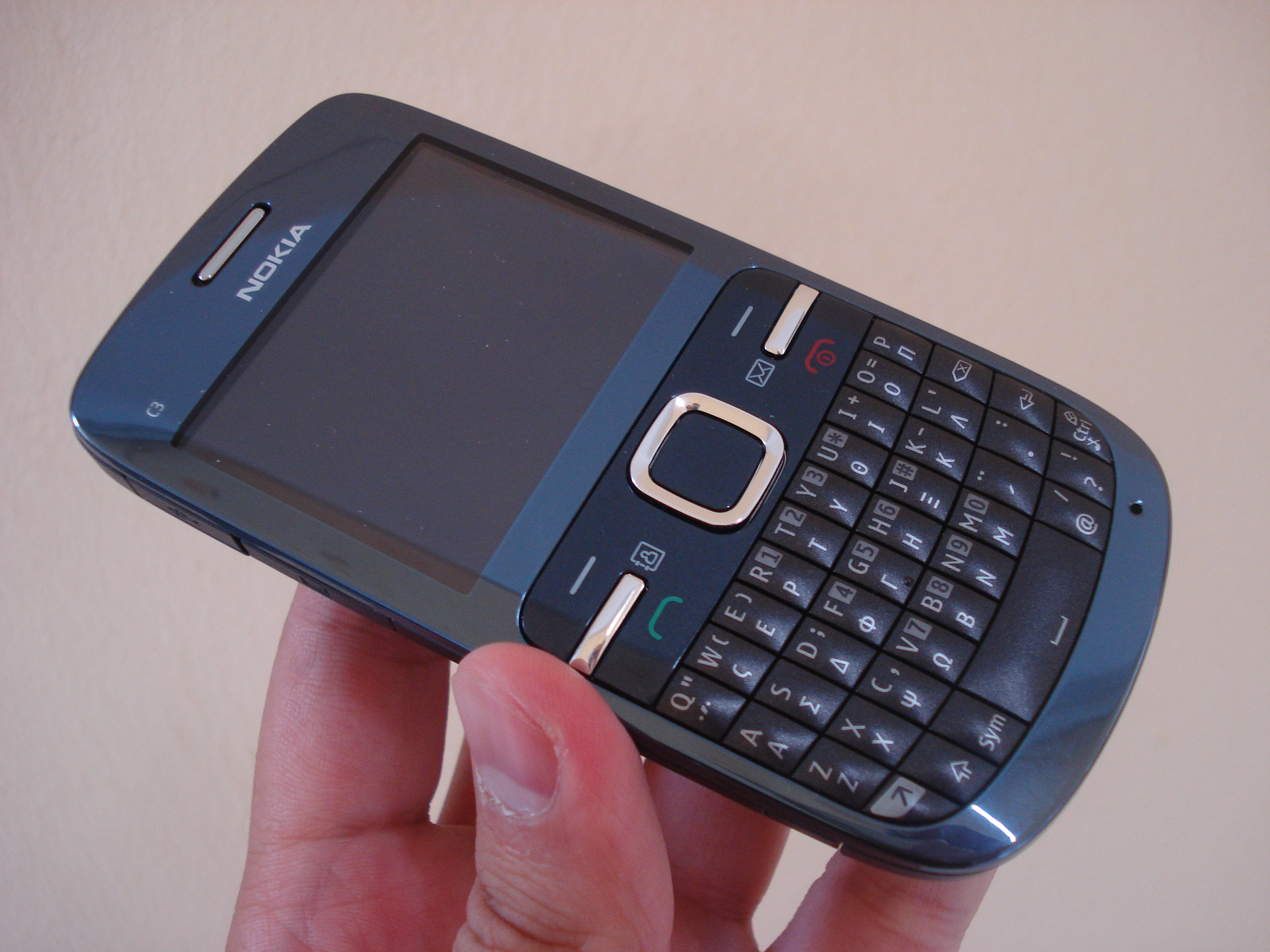
- Developer: Nokia Corporation
- Manufacturer: Nokia
- Series: Nokia Cseries
- First released: May 2010; 16 years ago
- Availability by region: June 2010
- Predecessor: Nokia 6800; Nokia 5510
- Successor: Nokia Asha; Nokia X5-01
- Related: Nokia C3 Touch and Type; Nokia X2-01
- Compatible networks: GSM 850/900/1800/1900
- Form factor: QWERTY
- Dimensions: 115.5 mm × 58.1 mm × 13.6 mm (4.55 in × 2.29 in × 0.54 in)
- Weight: 87.7 g (3.09 oz) (with battery)
- Operating system: Series 40 V 08.71 FOTA (firmware over-the-air)
- CPU: Broadcom BCM21351, 208 MHz ARM9 core processor
- Memory: 128 MB internal
- Storage: 55 MB user-available
- Removable storage: microSDHC up to 8 GB
- SIM: mini-SIM
- Battery: BL-5J 1320 mAh Li-ion battery
- Charging: 2.0mm Nokia proprietary charging and microUSB (USB 2.0)
- Rear camera: 2.0 megapixel fixed-focus
- Front camera: None
- Display: 2.4" Resolution: 320 x 240 pixels (TFT) 262,000 colours
- External display: None
- Connectivity: Bluetooth 2.1 with Enhanced Data Rate, USB 2.0
- Data inputs: QWERTY keyboard with dedicated messaging and contacts keys
- Other: Multimedia playback, Nokia Ovi Store

The Nokia C3-00 is an entry-level mobile phone with the Nokia Series 40 mobile operating system, part of the Nokia Cseries line. It features a full 4-line QWERTY keyboard, like the earlier Nokia 6800 series and Nokia 5510. It was advertised as a messaging and social networking feature phone, retailing at 90 EUR before taxes. It was introduced on April 13, 2010, alongside the Nokia E5 and C6.

== Features ==
The Nokia C3 was installed with Ovi Mail and Ovi Chat, which allowed users to set up their email and chat accounts straight from the device. It featured push mail and SMS, including access to Facebook and Twitter directly from the home. The C3-00 also has a 2-megapixel fixed-focus camera, built-in Wi-Fi, a 2.4-inch QVGA screen, 55 MB of internal memory, 8 GB of expandable storage via MicroSD card, and basic 2G connectivity. The phone comes with a Nokia BL-5J 1320 mAh battery.

== Specifications ==
Type	
Modes	Quad-band EGSM 850/900/1800/1900 Automatic switching between GSM bands Flight mode
Weight (with battery)	114 g (4 oz)
Dimensions	115.5 x 58.1 x 13.6 mm, 65 cm^{3} (4.0 cu in)
Form Factor	Candybar
Battery Life	Talk time (maximum): – GSM 9 h, Standby time (maximum): – GSM 800 h, Video playback time (maximum): 4 h, Video recording time (maximum): 1 h, Music playback time (maximum): 30 h,
Battery Type	BL-5J 1320 mAh Li-ion battery
Display	Type: LCD (Color) Colors: 262,000 colours Landscape Resolution: 320 x 240 pixels (TFT) ((QVGA))
User Interface	FOTA (firmware update over the air)
Memory	55 MB internal memory and MicroSD memory card slot, hot swappable, up to 16 GB. Internal 128MBit DDR RAM, 64 MB Flash
Processor	Broadcom "Juno" Baseband and Multimedia processor, ARM9 core @ 208 MHz
Wireless connectivity	Bluetooth version 2.1 + EDR – WLAN 802.11 B-G.
USB	High-Speed USB 2.0 (micro USB connector)
Packet Data	Technology: CSD, GPRS class A, multislot class 32, maximum speed 85.6/64.2 kbit/s (DL/UL), EGPRS MSC32
Side Keys	None
Applications	Java MIDP V. 2.1
Memory Card Slot	Card type: microSD up to 32 GB
FM Radio	Stereo: Yes, RDS enabled.
Music player	Supported audio formats: MP3, WMA, AAC, eAAC, eAAC+
Video player	Supported video formats: H.263, H.264, MPEG4-SP
Camera	Resolution: 2-megapixel with 4× digital zoom, Video Recording (Video capture in MPEG-4, QCIF max. resolution 320 x 240, Video file format: H.263, H.264, AVI, MPEG-4 (stored as .mpg or .3gp files), WMV)
Games	Block'd, Bounce Tales, Sudoku
Special Features	Standard 3.5 mm headphone jack on the top side utilizing the OMTP TRRS standard pin-out
Colors Available	Slate Grey, Golden White, Hot Pink, Black

== Issues ==
Issues are being reported by users regarding WLAN connectivity. YouTube videos do not play correctly on WLAN on some handsets. This handset also supports Bluetooth 2.1, but the A2DP profile isn't supported by the phone software, resulting in any stereo headset not being recognized. Furthermore, it has issues regarding call logs.
