= Nokia Asha 306 =

Mobile phone developed by Nokia

- Developer: Nokia Corporation
- Manufacturer: Nokia
- Type: Smartphone
- Series: Full Touch
- First released: Bangkok Malls
- Availability by region: Global
- Predecessor: Nokia C2-03
- Successor: Nokia Asha 503
- Compatible networks: GSM 850 / 900 / 1800 / 1900; GPRS/EDGE class B, multislot class 33
- Form factor: Full Touch candybar
- Dimensions: Width: 53.8 mm; Height: 110.3 mm; Thickness: 12.8 mm
- Weight: 96 g (3 oz)
- Operating system: Nokia Asha Series 40 OS
- CPU: 1 GHz processor (single-core)
- Memory: 32 MB RAM; 64 MB ROM
- Storage: 64MB ROM memory, 10 MB available for user
- Removable storage: up to 32 GB microSDHC
- SIM: miniSIM
- Battery: BL-4U 1110 mAh Li-Ion battery (removable); micro USB and 2 mm DC plug charging
- Charging: 2.0 mm Nokia pin charging (standard) & microUSB (USB 2.0) charging (standard)
- Rear camera: 2 MP (CMOS sensor) EDoF (1600 x 1200 px).
- Front camera: No
- Display: 240 x 400 px (WQVGA), 3.0 inch (155 ppi), 18 bits
- Connectivity: WLAN IEEE 802.11 b/g/n (2.4 GHz); bluetooth 2.1 +EDR; micro USB 2.0; USB On-the-Go 1.3; 3.5 mm AV connector (audio in/out); SIM card; FM receiver with RDS
- Data inputs: Resistive multipoint-touch display; External functional hardware keys

The Nokia Asha 306 is a "Full Touch" smartphone powered by Nokia's Series 40 operating system. It was announced at Bangkok by Nokia along with two others Asha Full Touch phones - the Nokia Asha 305 and 311. The 306 is considered to be the little brother of Asha 311 as it lacks 3G and capacitive touch screen. Its main features are the Full Touch resistive touchscreen and WLAN (WI-FI).

== History and availability ==
The Nokia Asha 306 was announced at Bangkok by Nokia. It will be available 3Q in 2012 Globally. The phone will be sold at a price of €68 subject to taxes and subsidies.

== Hardware ==
=== Screen and input ===
The Nokia Asha 306 has a 3.0-inch resistive touchscreen (multi point) with a resolution of 240 x 400 pixel (WQVGA). According to Nokia it is capable of displaying up to 65 thousand colors.

The back camera has an extended depth of field feature (no mechanical zoom), no flash and has a 4× digital zoom for both video and camera. The sensor size of the back camera is 2-megapixel, has a f/2.8 aperture and a 50 cm to infinity focus range. It is capable of video recording at up to 176 x 144 px at 10 fps with mono sound.

=== Buttons ===
On the front of the device, there are the answer/call key,. On the right side of the device there are the volume rocker and the lock/unlock button.

=== Battery and SIM ===
The battery life of the BL-4U (1110 mAh) as claimed by Nokia is 14 hours of talk time, from 600 hours of standby and 40 hours of music playback depending on actual usage.

The SIM card is located under the battery which can be accessed by removing the back panel of the device. No tool is necessary to remove the back panel.

=== Storage ===
Additional storage is available via a hot swappable microSDHC card socket, which is certified to support up to 32 GB of additional storage.

== Software ==
The Nokia Asha 306 is powered by Nokia Series S40 Full Touch operating system and comes with a variety of applications:

- Web: Nokia (proxy) Browser for Series 40
- Conversations: Nokia Messaging Service 3.2 (instant messaging and e-mail) and SMS, MMS
- Social: Facebook, Twitter, Flickr and Orkut, WhatsApp messenger S40.
- Media: Camera, Photos, Music player, Nokia Music Store (on selected market), Flash Lite 3.0 (for YouTube video), Video player
- Personal Information Management: Calendar, Detailed contact information
- Utilities: Notes, Calculator, To-do list, Alarm clock, Voice recorder, Stopwatch

The device comes with Nokia Maps for Series 40 and make use of cellular network for positioning as there is no GPS in the phone. Nokia Maps for Series 40 phones does not provide voice guided navigation and only allows for basic route (<10 km) to be plan. The software will provide step by step instructions, allows the user to see the route on a map and search for nearby points of interest. Depending on where the phone was purchased, regional maps (Europe, South America, etc.) are preloaded and, as such, an active internet connection to download map data is not required.

== See also ==
- List of Nokia products
