= Nokia C2 =

Nokia C2 can refer to several Nokia either mobile phones that run the Series 40 operating system or Android Go smartphone by HMD global.

- Nokia C2-00 dual sim in a "candybar" phone form factor with a regular keypad.
- Nokia C2-01 see Nokia Cseries.
- Nokia C2-02 touchscreen in a "slider" phone form factor with also a regular keypad. Additionally it has Ovi Maps.
- Nokia C2-03 dual sim touchscreen in a "slider" phone form factor with also a regular keypad. Additionally it has Ovi Maps.
- Nokia C2-05 slider phone form factor with a regular keypad. Additionally it has Ovi Maps.
- Nokia C2-06 dual sim touchscreen in a "slider" phone form factor with also a regular keypad. Additionally it has Ovi Maps.
- Nokia C2 (2020) Android Go smartphone unveiled in February 2020 by HMD Global.
