= Dual SIM =

Mobile phone with two SIM cards

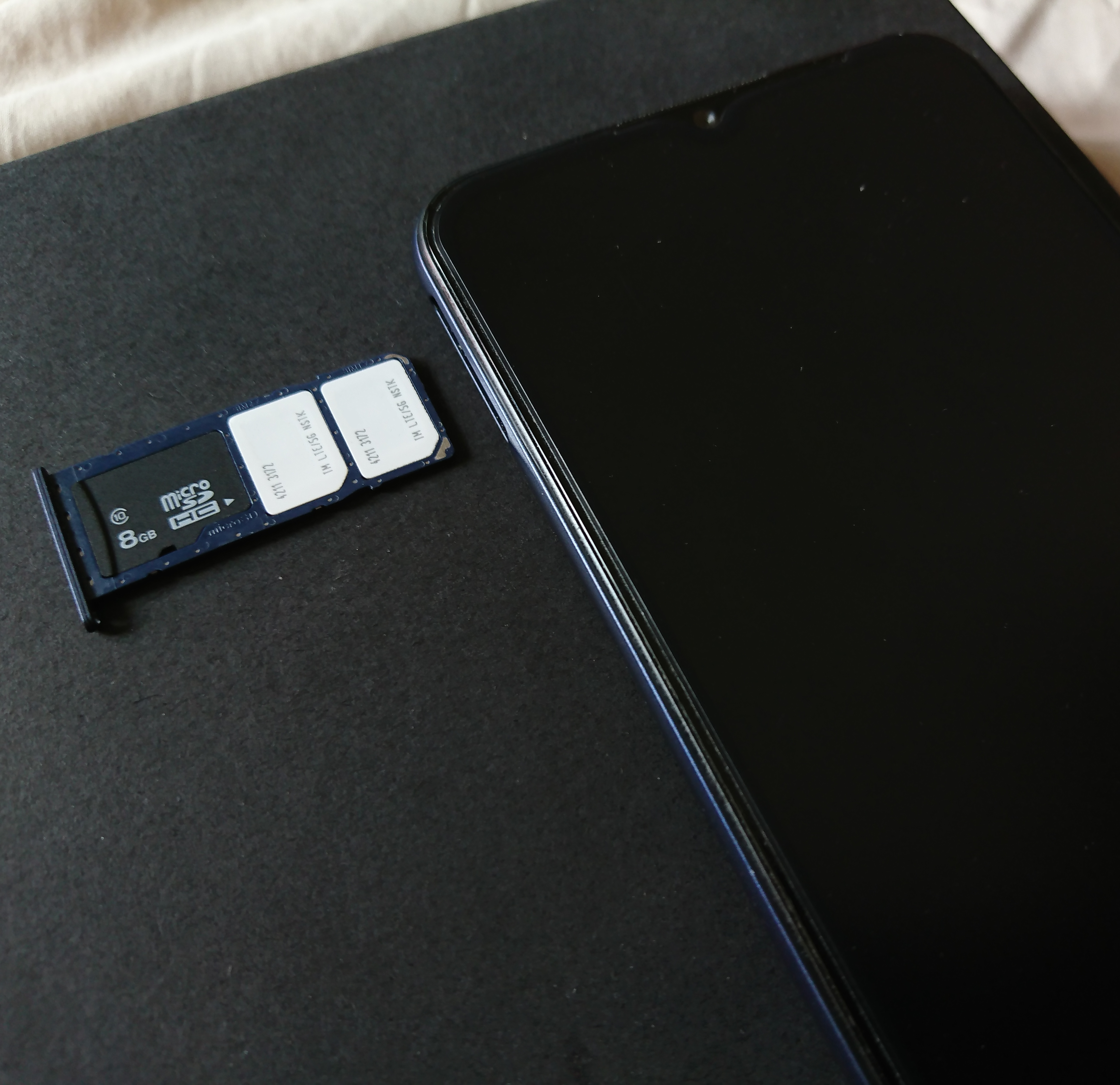
A modern Samsung Galaxy phone with two SIM card slots. It uses nano-SIM instead of the normal sized SIM.

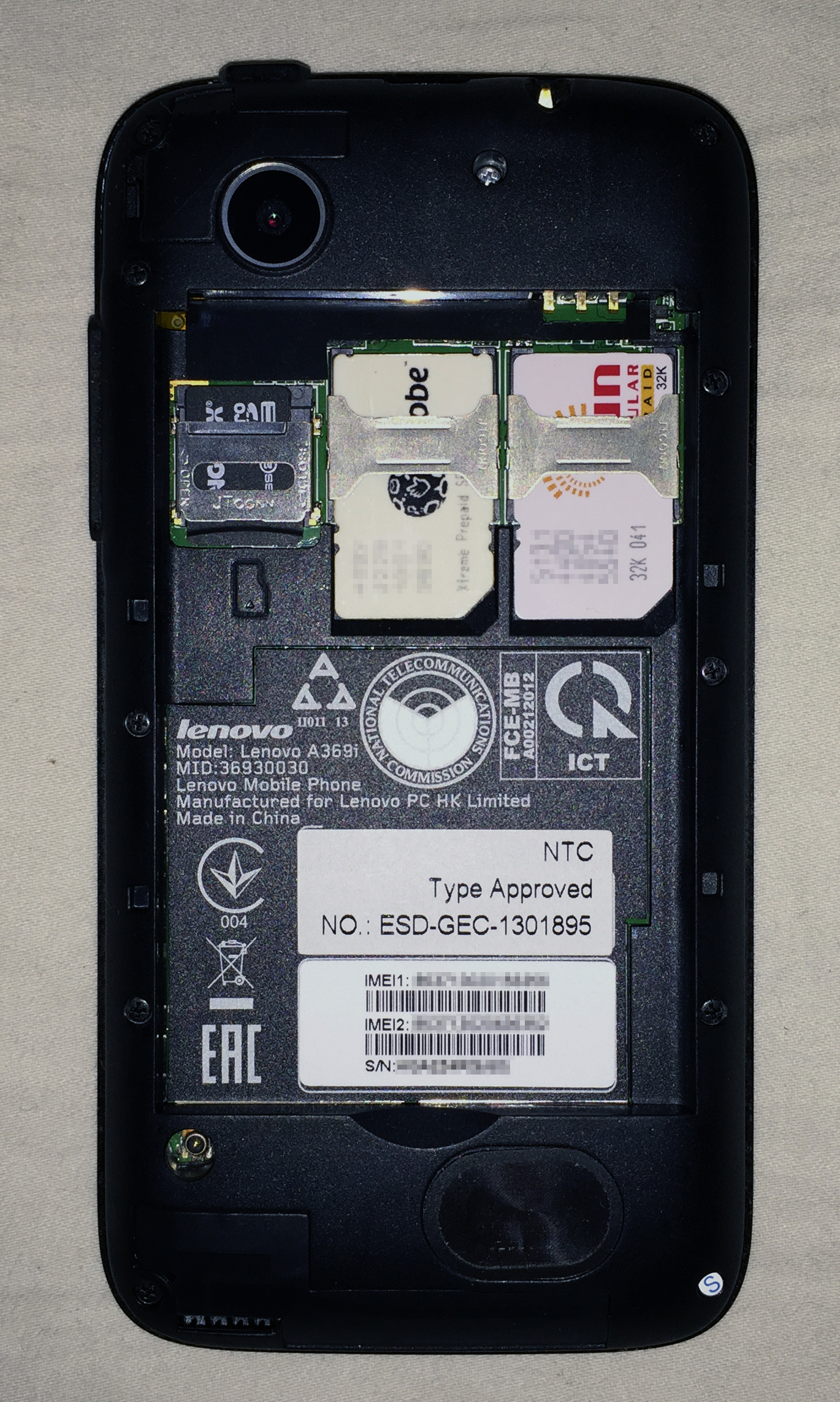
A Lenovo smartphone with two SIM card slots

Some mobile phones support use of two SIM cards, described as dual SIM operation. When a second SIM card is installed, the phone may allow users to switch between two separate mobile network services manually, have hardware support for keeping both connections in a "standby" state for automatic switching, or have two transceivers to maintain both network connections at once.

Dual SIM phones are mainstream in many countries where phones are normally sold unlocked. Dual SIMs are popular for separating personal and business calls, in locations where lower prices apply to calls between clients of the same provider, where a single network may lack comprehensive coverage, and for travel across national and regional borders. In countries where dual SIM phones are the norm, people who require only one SIM leave the second SIM slot empty. Dual SIM phones usually have two unique IMEI numbers, one for each SIM slot.

Devices that use more than two SIM cards have also been developed and released, notably the LG A290 triple SIM phone and the Huawei Mate 90, and even handsets that support four SIMs, such as the Cherry Mobile Quad Q70.

== History ==
The first phone to include dual SIM functionality was the Benefon Twin, released by Benefon in 2000. More dual SIM phones were introduced in about 2007, most of them coming from small Chinese firms producing phones using Mediatek systems-on-a-chip. They started to attract mainstream attention.

Such phones were initially eschewed by major manufacturers due to potential pressure from telecommunications companies, but from about 2010 Nokia, Samsung, Sony and several others followed suit, with the Nokia C2-00, Nokia C1-00, Nokia C2-03, Nokia C2-06, Nokia X1-01, Nokia 101 and most notably the Nokia X, phones from Samsung's Duos series and the Sony Xperia Z3 Dual, Sony Xperia C and tipo dual. Apple added dual SIM support in its 2018 iPhone XS models, with models sold in China containing two physical SIM slots, and models sold elsewhere supporting dual SIM by means of (Embedded) eSIM alongside a single physical SIM.

== Operation ==
For originating communications via the mobile phone network, the way to choose which SIM is used may vary on different phones. For example, one can be selected as primary or default for making calls, and one (which could be the same one) for data. Apple phones supporting dual SIMs can be set up to automatically use a specific SIM for each contact or the same one used for the last call to the contact, for iMessage, and for FaceTime. Typically when dialling or sending a message an option to select a SIM is displayed.

== Types ==
=== Adapters ===
Prior to the introduction of dual SIM phones, adapters that fit in the SIM card slot and hold two SIMs, with provision to switch between them when required.

=== Passive ===
In dual SIM switch phones, such as the Nokia C1-00, only one SIM, selected by the user, is active at any time; it is not possible to receive or make calls on the inactive SIM.

=== Standby ===
Dual SIM Dual Standby (DSDS) phones allow both SIMs to be accessed by using time multiplexing. When one SIM is in active use, for example on a call, the modem locks to it, leaving the other SIM unavailable. Older examples of dual-SIM standby phones include the Samsung Galaxy S Duos, the Sony Xperia M2 Dual, and the iPhone XS, XS Max and iPhone XR.

=== Active ===
Dual SIM Dual Active (DSDA) phones have two transceivers, and can receive calls on both SIM cards, at the cost of increased battery consumption and more complex hardware. One example is the HTC Desire 600.

=== Unequal connectors ===
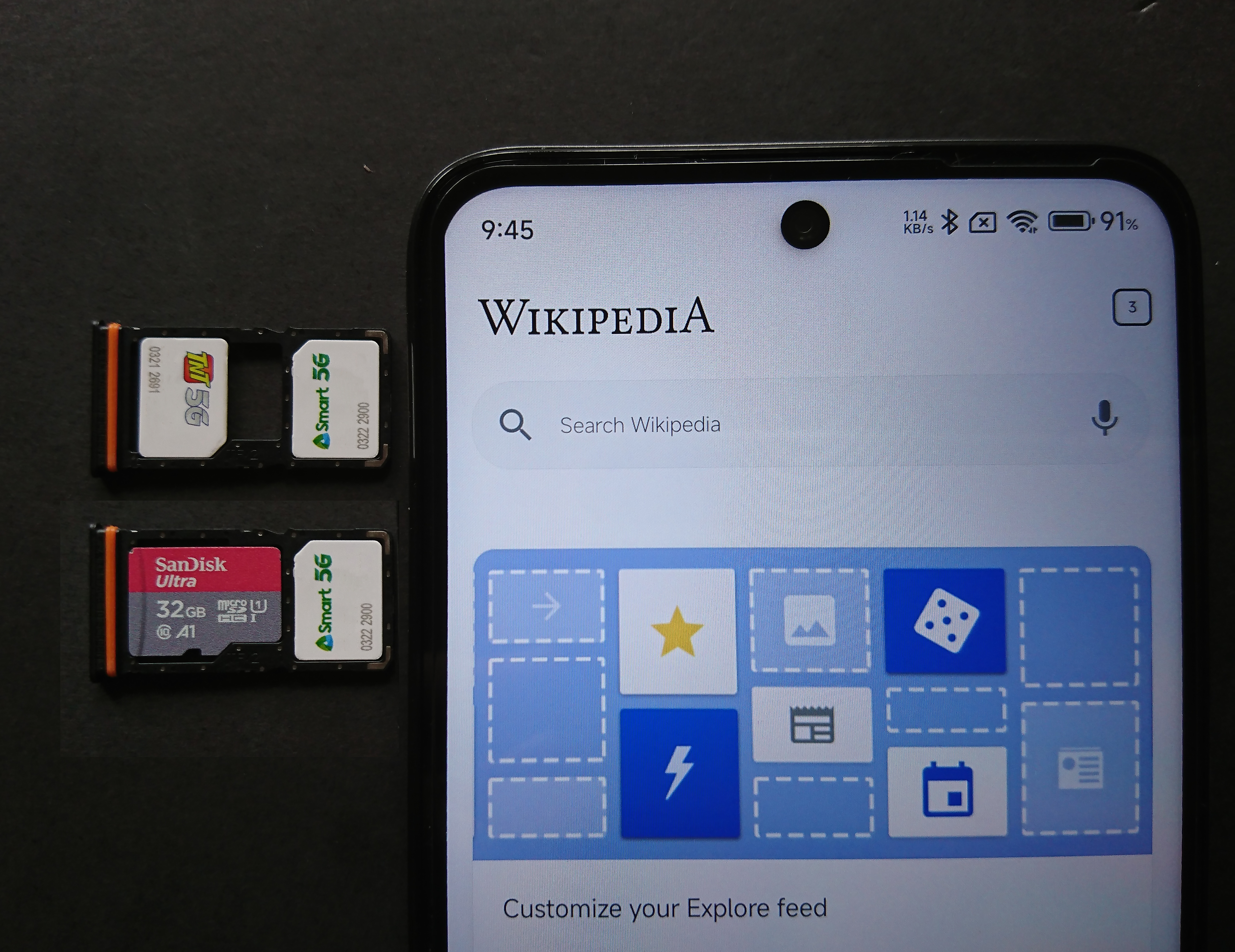
A dual SIM tray as shown on a Redmi 13. This phone accepts either two nano SIMs or a nano SIM and a MicroSD card in place of the second SIM slot.

Some telephones have a primary and a secondary SIM slot that support different generations of connectivity. For example, 4G and 3G primary, and 3G and 2G secondary, or 5G and 5G, or 5G and 4G. Selecting either of the SIMs as primary is usually possible without physically swapping the SIMs.

Some phone models utilize a "hybrid" SIM tray, which can hold either two SIM cards, or one SIM card and one MicroSD memory card. The Huawei Mate 20 range introduced a proprietary memory card format called Nano Memory, exactly the size and shape of a nano SIM card.

Some devices accept dual SIMs of different form factors. The Xiaomi Redmi Note 4 has a hybrid dual SIM tray that accepts one micro SIM card and one nano SIM card, the latter of which can be swapped for a MicroSD card.

== Market ==
Dual SIM phones have become popular especially with business users due to reduced costs by being able to use two different networks, with one possibly for personal use or based on signal strength or cost, without requiring several phones.

=== Availability ===
Some sub-contract Chinese companies supply inexpensive dual SIM handsets, mainly in Asian countries. The phones, which also usually include touch screen interfaces and other modern features, typically retail for a much lower price than branded models. While some such phones are sold under generic names or are rebadged by smaller companies under their own brand, numerous manufacturers, especially in China, produce phones, including dual SIM models, under counterfeit trademarks such as those of Nokia or Samsung, either as cosmetically-identical clones of the originals, or in completely different designs, with the logo of a notable manufacturer present in order to take advantage of brand recognition or brand image.

Dual SIM phones are common in developing countries, especially in China, Southeast Asia and the Indian subcontinent, with local firms like Karbonn Mobiles, LYF, Micromax and Cherry Mobile releasing feature phones and smartphones incorporating multiple SIM slots.

The French Wiko Mobile is also an example of rebadged Chinese Dual-SIM phones sold in few European countries as well as in North-West Africa.

=== Usage ===
Dual SIM phones have been rare in countries where phones have been usually sold on contract, as the carriers selling those phones prevent SIMs from competing carriers from being used with the phones. However, dual SIMs have been popular in locations where people normally buy phones directly from manufacturers. In such places there is little lock-in to carrier networks, and the costs of having two phone numbers are much lower.

Dual SIM phones allow separate numbers for personal and business calls on the same handset. Access to multiple networks is useful for people living in places where a single network's coverage may prove inadequate or unreliable. They are also useful in places where lower prices apply to calls between clients of the same provider.

Dual SIM phones allow users to keep separate contact lists on each SIM, and allow easier roaming by being able to access a foreign network while keeping the existing local card.

Vendors of foreign SIMs for travel often promote dual-SIM operation, with a home country and local SIM in the same handset.

== See also ==
- Dual mode mobile
- Subscriber Identity Module
- SIM cloning
- Shanzhai
