= 8800 =

8800 may refer to:

- The year 8800, in the 9th millennium.
- NVIDIA GeForce 8800, a computer graphics card series
- The Altair 8800, an early, experimental desktop-sized computer.
- Nokia 8800, a luxury mobile phone
- Intel iAPX 432, initially named the 8800
