= Nokia X3 =

Nokia X3 may refer to:

- Nokia X3-00
- Nokia X3-02, also called Nokia X3 Touch and Type, available in Q3 2010
