= Series 40 =

Mobile operating system

- Series 40 (5th Edition) showing the Menu, on a Nokia 6267
- Developer: Nokia
- Working state: Discontinued (2014)
- Source model: Closed source
- Package manager: .jad, .jar, .mid, .mod
- Supported platforms: ARM
- License: Proprietary
- Succeeded by: Series 30+

Support status
- Obsolete, unsupported

Nokia Series 40 Platform, often shortened as S40, is a software platform and application user interface (UI) software that was previously used on Nokia's broad range of mid-tier feature phones from 2002 to 2014, as well as on some of the Vertu line of luxury phones. It was at one point the world's most widely used mobile phone platform and found in hundreds of millions of mobile phones.

Series 40 was more advanced than Nokia's Series 30. It was not however used for smartphones (where Nokia used Symbian at the time, and later Windows Phone) and differentiates from them by not supporting true multi-tasking and do not have a native code API for third parties and thus do not support installable applications other than (with few exceptions) MIDlets that are written in Java. However, the simplicity of the system made it more responsive compared to Nokia's Series 60 smartphones.

The final Series 40 phone was released in 2013, after which Nokia feature phones switched to a different platform, Series 30+.

== History ==
The first Series 40 handset was 2002's Nokia 7210 with a 128x128 pixel, colour display. However in a retrospective press release from 2012, Nokia, possibly as a typo error, cited the first Series 40 phone to be the Nokia 7110 released in 1999, which had a 96 × 65 pixel monochrome display and was the first phone to come with a WAP browser.

Menu on a Nokia 7600 (Series 40 original version with 128x160 display)

Nokia announced on 25 January 2012 that the company had sold over 1.5 billion Series 40 devices.

In 2012 and 2013, several Series 40 phones from the Asha line, such as the 308, 309 and 311, were advertised as "smartphones" although they do not actually support smartphone features like multitasking or a fully fledged HTML browser.

The final mobile phone running Series 40 was the Nokia 515 from 2013, running the 6th Edition. In 2014, Microsoft acquired Nokia's mobile phones business. As part of a licensing agreement with the company, Microsoft Mobile was allowed to use the Nokia brand on feature phones, such as the Series 40 range. However, a July 2014 company memo revealed that Microsoft would end future production of Series 40 devices. It was replaced by Series 30+.

== Versions ==
The original version of Series 40 was classified by Nokia as: "a UI category for Nokia 128x128 pixel screen resolution. It comprises a passive matrix colour screen with two soft keys." The earliest products running these were Nokia 7210 and Nokia 3510i. An improved resolution of 128x160 and a three soft keys interface was first seen on the Nokia 6650 (globally released in second quarter 2003). This also appeared on Nokia 7600.

The second generation of the Series 40 platform, often called the 2nd Edition, first shipped with the Nokia 6230. This new version updates Java support to MIDP 2.0. In 2005, the Nokia 6230i was introduced with a higher 208x208 resolution display and this also appeared on Nokia 8800 and 8801.

Home idle screen on a Nokia Asha 300 with 'touch and type' interface

Series 40 3rd Edition was launched in 2005, the first handsets shipping with it being the Nokia 6111, 6270 and 6280. This new version is more closely aligned to the Series 60 user interface and introduces Active Standby, a more detailed idle screen with quicker access to apps and displaying of calendar and notes. This version also supports improved higher resolution QVGA (240x320 pixels) displays, although some handsets continued to use lower 128x160 resolution such as Nokia 5200 and 6111. The updated Feature Pack 1 of S40v3 adds support for Adobe Flash Lite mobile 3D graphics. Nokia 6233 and 6125 were some of the earliest to run this version. Feature Pack 2 added further additional features, including a new music player, playing in background, A2DP profile for Bluetooth, and the possibility of using Flash Lite SWF format animations as live wallpapers. Nokia 5300, 7373 and 7390 were the first to run S40v3 FP2.

Series 40 5th Edition (skipping the number 4 as was Nokia's habit) was released in 2007 with the earliest shipping devices being Nokia 6500 classic, Nokia 6500 slide and Nokia 7500 Prism. This version of Series 40 also upgrades to version 2.1 of Flash Lite.

Series 40 6th Edition first shipped with Nokia 7510 Supernova in late 2008. This version has updated Flash Lite 3, has support for WMA 10 and WMV 9, an improved web browser, and UI animations. The updated Feature Pack 1 of the 6th Edition adds touch support for the Touch and Type phones such as Nokia X3-02 and Nokia Asha 300. Subsequent versions were named Series 40 Developer Platform.

== Technical information ==
=== Applications ===
Series 40 provides communication applications such as telephone, Internet telephony (VoIP), messaging, email client with POP3 and IMAP4 capabilities and web browser; media applications such as camera, video recorder, music/video player and FM radio; and phonebook and other personal information management (PIM) applications such as calendar and tasks. Basic file management, like in Series 60, is provided in the Applications and Gallery folders and subfolders. Gallery is also the default location for files transferred over Bluetooth to be placed. User-installed applications on Series 40 are generally mobile Java applications. Flash Lite applications are also supported, but mostly used for screensavers. BREW applications are also supported too, but for some Qualcomm based Nokia CDMA phones only.

It is possible to customize the look and feel of the UI via comprehensive themes.

=== Web browser ===
The integrated web browser can access most web content through the service provider's XHTML/HTML gateway. The latest version of Series 40, called Series 40 6th Edition, introduced a new browser based on the WebKit open source components WebCore and JavaScriptCore. The new browser delivers support for HTML 4.01, CSS2, JavaScript 1.5, and Ajax. Also, like the higher-end Series 60, Series 40 can run the UC Browser web browser to enhance the user's web browsing experience. The latest feature phones from the Asha lineup come with the Nokia Xpress Browser which uses proxy servers to compress and optimize web pages in a similar fashion as Opera Mini.

=== Synchronization ===
Support for SyncML synchronization of the address book, calendar and notes with external services is present. However, with many S40 phones, these synchronization settings must be sent via an OTA text message.

=== Software platform ===
Series 40 is an embedded software platform that is open for software development via standard or de facto content and application development technologies. It supports Java MIDlets, i.e. Java MIDP and CLDC technology, which provide location, communication, messaging, media, and graphics capabilities. S40 also supports Flash Lite applications.

A small number of CDMA network Nokia phones were released based on Qualcomm processors which run Series 40 on top of REX OS, such as the Nokia 3806. These Series 40 devices support BREW platform applications.

In addition to REX OS and other proprietary operating systems, a Series 40-like implementation called Cover UI was used by Nokia for the cover screen interface on later Communicator smartphones such as the Nokia 9300 which ran as a system application on top of Symbian. Nokia also used a stripped-down version of Series 40 on their HS-13W Wireless Image Headset, a Bluetooth-connected headset with a built-in colour display.

== List of devices ==
The following is a list of Series 40 devices released by Nokia:

Nokia 1xxx series

- Nokia 1680 classic

Nokia 2xxx series

- Nokia 2220 slide
- Nokia 2320 classic
- Nokia 2323 classic
- Nokia 2330 classic
- Nokia 2355
- Nokia 2600 classic
- Nokia 2610
- Nokia 2626
- Nokia 2630
- Nokia 2650
- Nokia 2660
- Nokia 2680 slide
- Nokia 2690
- Nokia 2700 classic
- Nokia 2710
- Nokia 2720 fold
- Nokia 2730 classic
- Nokia 2760
- Nokia 2855
- Nokia 2855i
- Nokia 2865
- Nokia 2865i

Nokia 3xxx series

- Nokia 3100
- Nokia 3105
- Nokia 3108
- Nokia 3109 classic
- Nokia 3110 classic
- Nokia 3110 Evolve
- Nokia 3120
- Nokia 3120 classic
- Nokia 3125
- Nokia 3128
- Nokia 3152
- Nokia 3155
- Nokia 3155i
- Nokia 3200
- Nokia 3205
- Nokia 3220
- Nokia 3300
- Nokia 3300 Americas
- Nokia 3500 classic
- Nokia 3510i
- Nokia 3555
- Nokia 3585i
- Nokia 3586
- Nokia 3586i
- Nokia 3587
- Nokia 3587i
- Nokia 3595
- Nokia 3600 slide
- Nokia 3610
- Nokia 3710 fold
- Nokia 3720 classic

Nokia 5xxx series

- Nokia 5000
- Nokia 5070
- Nokia 5100
- Nokia 5130 XpressMusic
- Nokia 5140
- Nokia 5140i
- Nokia 5200
- Nokia 5220 XpressMusic
- Nokia 5300 XpressMusic
- Nokia 5310 XpressMusic
  - Nokia 5330 XpressMusic
  - Nokia 5330 Mobile TV Edition
  - Nokia 5610 XpressMusic

Nokia 6xxx series

- Nokia 6010
- Nokia 6012
- Nokia 6015
- Nokia 6015i
- Nokia 6020
- Nokia 6021
- Nokia 6030
- Nokia 6060
- Nokia 6070
- Nokia 6080
- Nokia 6085
- Nokia 6086
- Nokia 6100
- Nokia 6101
- Nokia 6102
- Nokia 6102i
- Nokia 6103
- Nokia 6108
- Nokia 6111
- Nokia 6125
- Nokia 6126
- Nokia 6131
- Nokia 6131 NFC
- Nokia 6133
- Nokia 6136
- Nokia 6151
- Nokia 6152
- Nokia 6155
- Nokia 6155i
- Nokia 6165
- Nokia 6170
- Nokia 6200*
- Nokia 6208 classic
- Nokia 6212 classic
- Nokia 6216 classic
- Nokia 6220
- Nokia 6225
- Nokia 6230
- Nokia 6230i
- Nokia 6233
- Nokia 6234
- Nokia 6235
- Nokia 6235i
- Nokia 6255
- Nokia 6260 slide
- Nokia 6263
- Nokia 6265
- Nokia 6265i
- Nokia 6267
- Nokia 6270
- Nokia 6275
- Nokia 6275i
- Nokia 6280
- Nokia 6282
- Nokia 6288
- Nokia 6300
- Nokia 6300i
- Nokia 6301
- Nokia 6303 classic
- Nokia 6303i classic
- Nokia 6350
- Nokia 6500 classic
- Nokia 6500 slide
- Nokia 6555
- Nokia 6585
- Nokia 6560
- Nokia 6600 fold
- Nokia 6600 slide
- Nokia 6600i
- Nokia 6610
- Nokia 6610i
- Nokia 6700 Classic
- Nokia 6750 Mural
- Nokia 6800
- Nokia 6810
- Nokia 6820
- Nokia 6822

Nokia 7xxx series:

- Nokia 7020
- Nokia 7070
- Nokia 7100 Supernova
- Nokia 7110
- Nokia 7200
- Nokia 7210
- Nokia 7210 Supernova
- Nokia 7230
- Nokia 7250
- Nokia 7260
- Nokia 7270
- Nokia 7280
- Nokia 7310 Supernova
- Nokia 7360
- Nokia 7370
- Nokia 7373
- Nokia 7380
- Nokia 7390
- Nokia 7500 Prism
- Nokia 7510 Supernova
- Nokia 7600
- Nokia 7610 Supernova
- Nokia 7900 Prism
- Nokia 7900 Crystal Prism

Nokia 8xxx series

- Nokia 8600 Luna
- Nokia 8800*
- Nokia 8800 Sirocco
- Nokia 8800 Arte
- Nokia 8800 Gold Arte
- Nokia 8800 Sapphire Arte
- Nokia 8800 Carbon Arte
- Nokia 8910i

Nokia Cseries:

- Nokia C1-01
- Nokia C1-02
- Nokia C2-00
- Nokia C2-01
- Nokia C2-02
- Nokia C2-03
- Nokia C2-05
- Nokia C2-06
- Nokia C3-00
- Nokia C3 Touch and Type

Nokia Xseries (Not to be confused with Nokia X Family):

- Nokia X2-00
- Nokia X2-01
- Nokia X2-02
- Nokia X2-05
- Nokia X3-00
- Nokia X3-02

Nokia Asha series

- Nokia Asha 200/201
- Nokia Asha 202
- Nokia Asha 203
- Nokia Asha 205
- Nokia Asha 210
- Nokia Asha 300
- Nokia Asha 301
- Nokia Asha 302
- Nokia Asha 303
- Nokia Asha 305
- Nokia Asha 306
- Nokia Asha 308
- Nokia Asha 309
- Nokia Asha 310
- Nokia Asha 311

== See also ==
- Nokia Asha platform, an evolution of Series 40
- Symbian OS
- Nokia X platform
- Windows Phone
- Series 20
- Series 30
- Series 30+
- Series 60
- Series 80
- Series 90
- UIQ
- iOS
- Android
- Maemo
- MeeGo
- Firefox OS
- KaiOS
- BREW
- REX OS
