= C301 =

C301 may refer to:

- Taipei Metro C301, the first Taipei Metro heavy-capacity train model
- C-301, a large supersonic coastal defense anti-ship missile
- Nokia C3-01 Touch and Type, one of Nokia's stainless steel mobile telephone handsets to possess a touchscreen in a "candybar" form factor
