= Nokia C2-02 =

Smartphone produced by Nokia

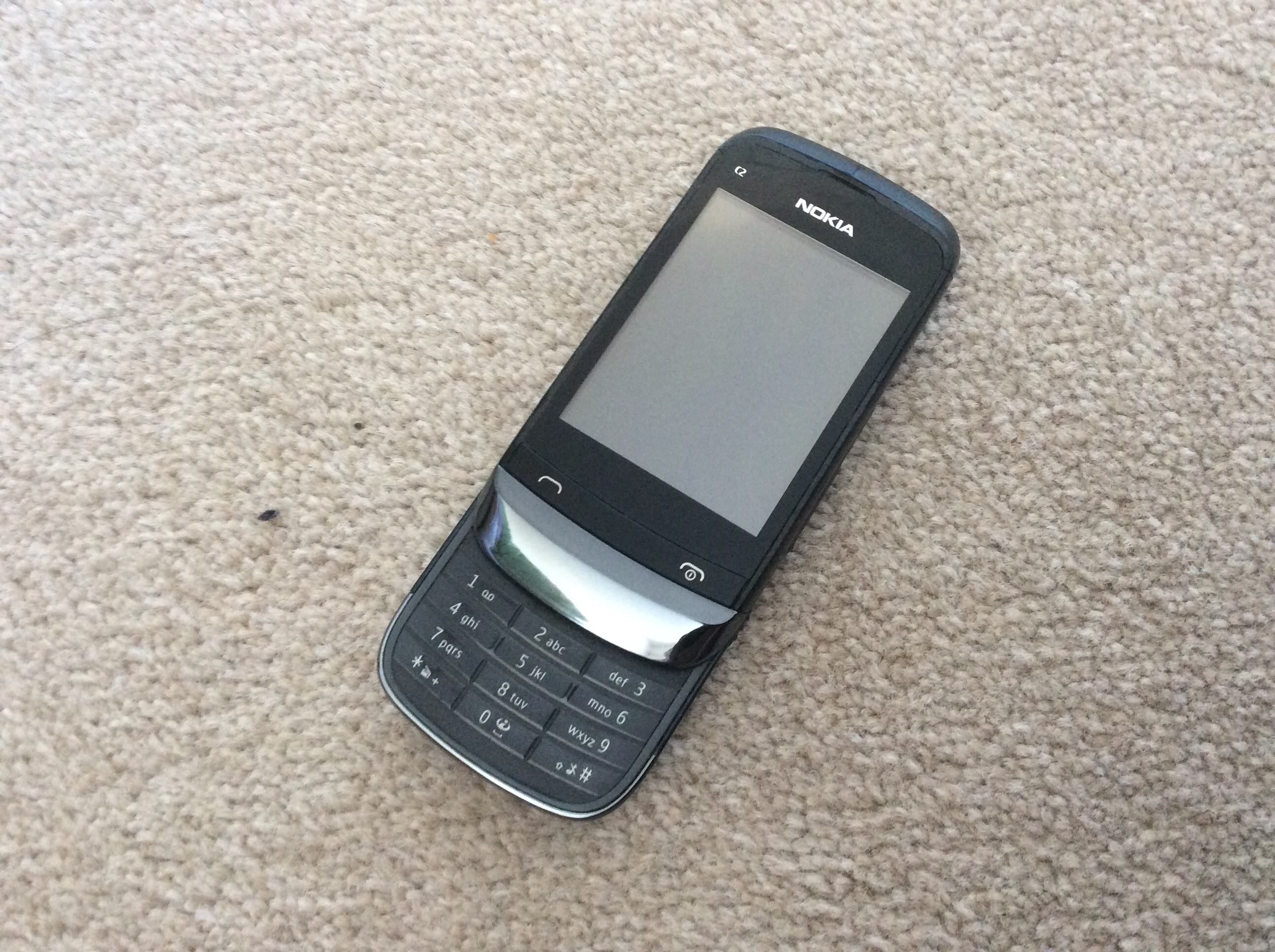
- Nokia C2-02
- Manufacturer: Nokia
- Availability by region: August 2011
- Predecessor: Nokia 2680 slide
- Successor: Nokia Asha 305
- Related: Nokia C2-03; Nokia C2-06
- Compatible networks: GSM 900/1800 GSM 850/1900
- Form factor: slide
- Dimensions: 103×51.4×17 mm (4.06×2.02×0.67 in)
- Weight: 115 g (4 oz)
- Operating system: Series 40 6th edition feature pack 1
- Memory: 10 MB
- Battery: BL-5C 3.7 V 1020 mAh
- Rear camera: 2 MP, 1600 x 1200 pixels
- Display: 2.6 inch resistive touch QVGA TFT (262 000 colors)
- Connectivity: Bluetooth 2.1+EDR, Micro-USB

The Nokia C2-02 is a feature phone produced by Nokia as part of the budget Nokia Cseries line. This is one of the first mobile phones released by Nokia that possesses a touchscreen in a slider form factor (the other one being Nokia C2-03 body which is a dual-SIM variant).This phone is also known as Nokia C2-02 Touch and Type.

== Features ==
The key feature of this phone is touch and type. It means that the phone has touch screen and alpha-numeric (12 key) keyboard but no navigation or soft keys. Other main features include: a 2.0-megapixel camera, Maps (disputable.) (Customers who never received maps have their phones loaded with Nokia Life Tools application), Bluetooth 2.1 + EDR, Flash Lite 3.0 and MIDP Java 2.1 with additional Java APIs.

== Specification sheet ==
Type	Specification
Modes	GSM 900 /1800 GSM 850/1900
Weight	115 g
Dimensions	103 x 51.4 x 17 mm
Form Factor	Slide
Battery Life	Stand-by / Up to 600 h; Talk time / Up to 5 h; Music play / Up to 37 h
Battery Type	BL-5C 3.7 V 1020 mAh
Display	Display size: 6.6 cm; Display resolution - Height: 320 pixels; Display resolution: QVGA (320 x 240); Display resolution - Width: 240 pixels; Display colors: HighColor (16-bit/64k); Aspect ratio: 4:3; Pixel density: 154 ppi; Display technology: LCD Transmissive
Sim Card Type	Mini Sim
Charging connectors	2.0 mm Charging Connector
Data Network	GSM max data speed DL: EGPRS 177.6 kbit/s; GSM max data speed UL: GPRS 85.6 kbit/s
Call management	Call management features: Call waiting, Call forwarding, Call logs: dialled, received and missed, Conference call, Integrated hands-free speakers, Speed dial, Call barring; Supports number of contacts: 1000; Noise cancellation: Yes; Speech codecs: GSM FR, GSM HR, AMR-NB, GSM EFR
Camera	Main camera sensor: 2 MP; Camera resolution: 1600 x 1200 pixels; Camera resolution height: 1200 pixels; Camera resolution width: 1600 pixels; Main camera focus type: Fixed focus; Camera digital zoom: 4 x; Camera minimum focus range: 100 cm; Camera minimum focus range: 100 cm; Camera image formats: JPEG; Flash type: No Flash; other features: Still image editor, Full screen viewfinder, Self-timer
Image capturing	Capture modes: Video, Still, Self-timer; Colour tone modes: Sepia, Normal, Negative, Greyscale; White balance modes: Incandescent, Fluorescent, Daylight, Automatic; Photos viewed by: Slide show, Album, Timeline
Main video camera	Camera video resolution: QCIF (176 x 144); Camera video resolution height: 144 pixels; Camera video resolution width: 176 pixels; Camera video frame rate: 15 fps; Camera video zoom: 4 x; Video recording formats: MP4/H.264, MP4/MPEG-4; Video white balance modes: Fluorescent, Incandescent, Automatic, Daylight
Platform / OS	BB5 / Nokia Series 40, 6th Edition feature pack 1
Memory	10 MB
Digital TTY/TDD	Yes
RAM	32 MB
Bluetooth	Yes v2.1, A2DP Supported Profiles: DUN, FTP, GAP, GOEP, HFP, HSP, OPP, PAN, PBAP, SAP, SDAP, SPP
PC Sync	Yes, via micro USB
USB	Micro-USB
Messaging Features	Instant messaging, List of recently used numbers, Text messaging, Multimedia messaging, Conversational chat style SMS, Unified inbox for SMS and MMS, Picture messaging
Packet Data	Technology: GPRS, EDGE (EGPRS)
WLAN	No
WAP / Web Browser	XHTML Basic, HTML 4.0, CSS, XHTML 1.1, XHTML Mobile Profile, Open Source Gecko Layout Engine, JavaScript 1.8, WAP 2.0, DOM Level 1 and 2, Proxy Browser with Compression Technology, CSS 2.1, CSS Mobile Profile
Predictive Text Entry	T9
Side Keys	volume keys on right
Memory Card Slot	Card Type: microSD up to 32 GB.
Email Client	Protocols Supported: IMAP4, POP3, SMTP supports attachments
MMS	MMS 1.2 / SMIL
FM Radio	Stereo: Yes Radio recording(in selected countries)
Music Player	Supported Formats: AAC, AAC+, AMR-NB, AMR-WB, eAAC+, MIDI Tones (poly 64), Mobile XMF, MP3, MP4, NRT, True tones, WAV, WMA
Streaming Video	No
Games	Golf Tour, Memorize, Music Guess, Nature Park, Picture Puzzle, Solitaire
Java ME	Version: MIDP 2.1, CLDC 1.1 supported JSRs: 75, 82, 118, 135, 139, 172, 177, 179, 184, 205, 211, 226, 234, 248, Nokia UI API 1.1b (Includes Gesture API and Frame Animator API)
Headset Jack	Yes (3.5 mm)
Latest Firmware Version	v07.66
Additional Features	Digital clock, Recorder, Calculator, Calendar, Converter, Fixed dialling number, Notes, Alarm clock, Reminders, Phonebook, To-do list
