= Orange Rio =

- Brand: Orange
- Manufacturer: ZTE Corporation
- Type: Feature phone
- Series: ZTE-G
- First released: 2011, United Kingdom
- Successor: Orange Rio II
- Compatible networks: Dual band – GSM 900/1800
- Form factor: Bar phone
- Operating system: Proprietary operating system, no upgrades
- Storage: 6MB internal
- Removable storage: 16GB SDHC card
- Battery: Replaceable
- Rear camera: 2Mpx sensor with autofocus
- Display: 2.4in 320x240 pixels TFT LCD with touch screen
- Sound: Speaker, 3.5mm audio jack, Bluetooth headset support, vibration motor
- Connectivity: Mini USB
- Data inputs: Resistive touchscreen + QWERTY keyboard

The Orange Rio is a rebadged version of ZTE's X991. It is sold on the Orange network, and is a BlackBerry-styled phone directed to people on budgets or young users, with a QWERTY keyboard and a 2.4" touchscreen.

== Specifications ==
The Orange Rio has a 2.4 inch resistive touchscreen, unlike many other BlackBerry handsets and has a 320x240 (QVGA) resolution. However, it lacks 3G or Wi-Fi connectivity, and has Class 10 GPRS connectivity. It connects and charges using the mini-USB standard. It is a 2G handset. It is shipped with Opera's Opera Mini, and supports J2ME so users can load applications at their own will.
