= Nokia 6555 =

Mobile phone model

- Manufacturer: Nokia
- Availability by region: August 2007
- Compatible networks: GSM, GPRS, HSCSD, EDGE, UMTS
- Dimensions: 99.6×44.3×19.6 mm (3.92×1.74×0.77 in)
- Weight: 97 g (3 oz)
- Operating system: Nokia OS
- Memory: 30 MB internal memory
- Rear camera: 1.3-megapixel
- Display: active-matrix 240 x 320 pixel (QVGA) 2,0”, 16M Colors
- External display: 128 x 160 pixel, 262k colors
- Connectivity: Bluetooth
- Hearing aid compatibility: M3/T3

The Nokia 6555 is a clamshell mobile phone launched in the third quarter of 2007. It came in 4 colors: red, gold, silver and black.

== Features ==
- Active-matrix 240 x 320 pixel (QVGA) 2,0” main display with 16M Colors
- Secondary display in 128 x 160 pixel with 262k colors
- Video recorder with audio support (records up to 60 seconds in 176 x 144 resolution)
- Streaming video and audio
- Wireless connectivity with Bluetooth
- 30 MB internal memory
- Java MIDP 2.0 applications
- Data synchronization with PC via PC Suite

Additional features:

- Nokia Operating System 40 5th edition
- microSD card slot up to 4GB Max
- Micro-USB 2.0
- HSCSD data transfer up to 43.2 kbit/s

== Operating frequencies ==
- Global(RM-271): UMTS (WCDMA) 850/2100 and Quad Band GSM 850/900/1800/1900
- AT&T(RM-289): UMTS (WCDMA) 850/1900 and Quad Band GSM 850/900/1800/1900
