= Nokia 2690 =

2010 cell phone model

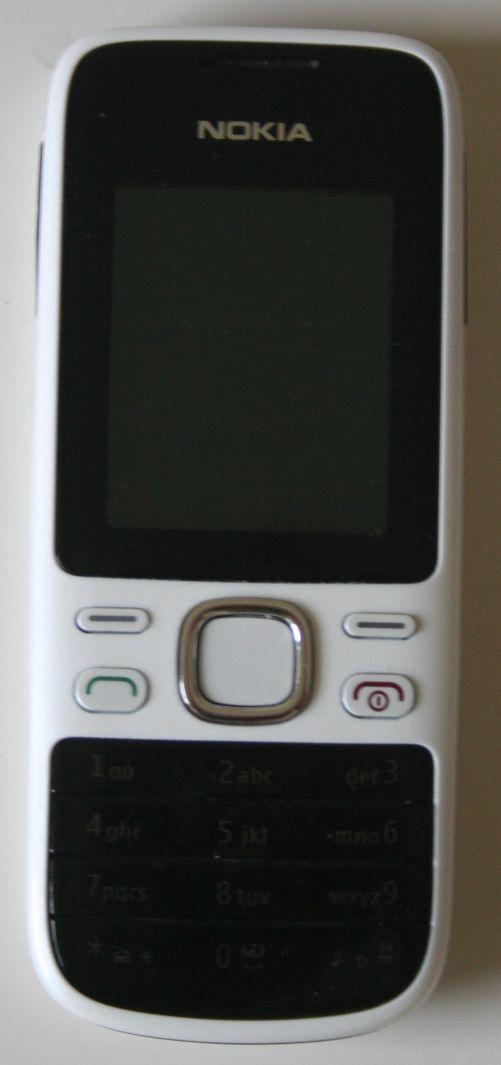
- A Nokia 2690 mobile phone with a white casing
- Manufacturer: Nokia
- Series: Nokia 2000 series
- First released: November 2009
- Availability by region: March 2010
- Predecessor: Nokia 2600 classic Nokia 2630
- Related: Nokia 2700 classic Nokia 2730 classic Nokia C1-01
- Compatible networks: GSM, GPRS
- Form factor: Candybar
- Dimensions: 107.5×45.5×13.8 mm (4.23×1.79×0.54 in)
- Weight: 80.7 g (3 oz)
- Operating system: Series 40 5th Edition Feature Pack 1
- Memory: 25 MB
- Removable storage: MicroSD, max. 8 GB
- Battery: BL-4C, 860 mAh
- Rear camera: VGA (0.3 megapixels)
- Display: 1.8 inch, 262,144 color, 128 × 160, TFT
- Connectivity: Bluetooth, USB
- Data inputs: Numeric Keypad

The Nokia 2690 is a mobile phone released by Nokia in March 2010. It operates on GSM quad band frequency 850, 900, 1800 and 1900 MHz, with automatic switching between frequencies. It has dimensions of 107.5 × 45.5 × 13.8 mm and weighs 80.7 grams (2.85 oz).

== Technical specifications ==
The Nokia 2690 has a 1.8 inches (4.6 cm) screen and a digital camera that takes photos (640 × 480 resolution) and videos (176 × 144 resolution). It also includes an FM radio. It can connect to the Internet using the Opera Mini browser.
