= Nokia 2730 classic =

2009 cell phone model

Nokia 2730 Classic
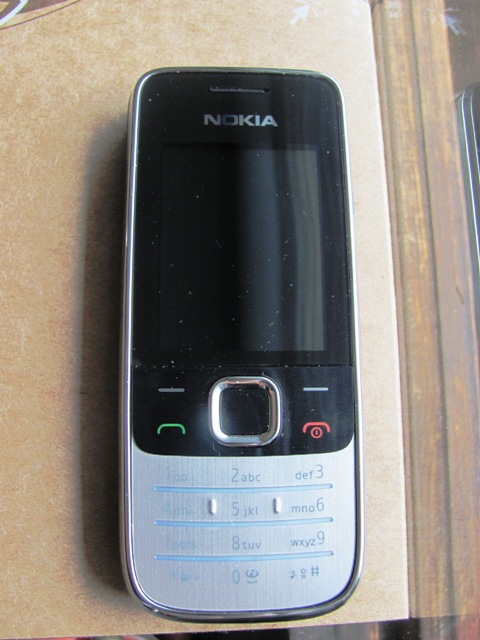
- Manufacturer: Nokia
- Series: Nokia 2000 series
- Availability by region: October 2009
- Predecessor: Nokia 2630
- Successor: Nokia C2-01
- Related: Nokia 2690; Nokia 2700 classic
- Form factor: Candybar
- Dimensions: 109.6 mm × 46.9 mm × 14.4 mm (4.31 in × 1.85 in × 0.57 in)
- Weight: 87.7 g (3.09 oz) (with battery)
- Operating system: Nokia Series 40, 5th Edition, Feature Pack 1
- CPU: ARM9 231 MHz
- Memory: 30 MB
- Removable storage: microSD
- Battery: BL-5C, 1020 mAh; Talk time: Up to 7 hrs (GSM), Up to 3 hrs (WCDMA); Stand-by: Up to 360 hrs (GSM), Up to 400 hrs (WCDMA)
- Rear camera: 2 MP
- Display: 2 inch, 18-bit (262,144 colors), 240×320 px, TFT
- Connectivity: Photo and data sharing with Bluetooth 2.0 and USB 2.0
- Data inputs: Numeric Keypad

The Nokia 2730 classic is a Nokia Quad-band GSM/UMTS 3G cell phone that includes a camera, FM radio, Bluetooth, music and video player, as well as several internet-based applications (web browser, e-mail client, instant messaging).

== Technical specifications ==
=== Key features ===
- 2 megapixel camera, with a max resolution of 1600×1200 pixels for photos, and 176×144 pixels for video, at 15 frames per second.
- MP3, 'Tutan ringtones and user-created ringtones (Voice Recorder)
- FM radio (supports RDS)
- Bluetooth 2.0 + EDR
- SMS, MMS, email, and Nokia Xpress Audio Messaging
- 30 MB internal dynamic memory, microSD memory card slot with hot swap, max. 2 GB (tests reveal that 8 GB and even 16 GB microSD cards works fine if you have firmware v10.45 or newer).

=== Operating frequency ===
- Europe(RM-578): UMTS (WCDMA) 900/2100 and Quad Band GSM 850/900/1800/1900
- North, Central & South America(RM-579): UMTS (WCDMA) 850/1900 and Quad Band GSM 850/900/1800/1900

=== Dimensions ===
- Volume: 63.5 cc
- Weight: 73.2 g (without battery)
- Length: 109.6 mm
- Width: 46.7 mm
- Thickness: 12 mm

=== Display ===
- 2 inch, 18-bit color depth (262,144 colors), 240×320 pixel.

=== Multimedia ===
- 2-megapixel camera (Supports 1600 × 1200 pixels for photos and 176 × 144 pixels for video recording)
- Music player
  - Plays AMR, AMR-WB, MIDI, MXMF, MP3, AAC, MP4/M4A/3GP/3GA(AAC, AAC+, eAAC+, AMR, AMR-WB), X-Tone, WAV(PCM, a-law, mu-law, ADPCM), WMA(WMA9, WMA10)
- Video player (174 × 144, 3gp formats or Flash formats)
- Voice recorder
- FM radio with RDS support
- 5 band equalizer, with two customizable presets
- Image viewer
  - Supports BMP, GIF87a, GIF89a, JPEG, PNG, WBMP, and have some support for SVG

=== Connectivity ===
- Bluetooth
  - Supported Bluetooth Profiles: A2DP, AVRCP, DUN, FTP, GAP, GAVDP, GOEP, HFP, HSP, OPP, PBAP, SAP, SDAP, SPP
- MicroUSB (type B plug), supports USB 2.0
- Mass Storage Mode
- Nokia AV 3.5 mm (3.5 mm TRRS connector)

=== Power management ===
- Battery: BL-5C
- Voltage: 3.7 volts (nominal)
- Capacity: 1020 mAh
- Output: 3.8 Wh
- Talk time: Up to 3.8 hrs (GSM) Up to 3.5 hrs (W-CDMA)
- Stand-by: Up to 14 days (GSM) Up to 18 days (W-CDMA)

=== Messaging ===
- SMS (1000 character limit) and MMS support.
  - MMS revision 1.3 (300 kilobyte limit)
- Nokia Xpress Audio Messaging (sends greetings with short voice clips)
- Email supports POP3, IMAP4 and SMTP protocols
- Supports instant messaging
  - Includes Ovi by Nokia, Windows Live Messenger, Yahoo! Messenger

=== Java applications ===
- JSR 139 Connected, Limited Device Configuration (CLDC) 1.1
- JSR 118 MIDP 2.1j
- JSR 248 Mobile Service Architecture Subset for CLDC
- JSR 75 FileConnection and PIM API
- JSR 82 Java APIs for Bluetooth 1.1
- JSR 135 Mobile Media API 1.1
- JSR 172 J2ME Web Services Specification (RPC package)
- JSR 172 J2ME Web Services Specification (XML Parser package)
- JSR 177 Security and Trust Services API for J2ME (SATSA-APDU package)
- JSR 177 Security and Trust Services API for J2ME (SATSA-CRYPTO package)
- JSR 184 Mobile 3D Graphics API for J2ME 1.1
- JSR 205 Wireless Messaging API 2.0
- JSR 211 Content Handler API
- JSR 226 Scalable 2D Vector Graphics API
- JSR 234 Advanced Multimedia Supplements 1.0 (audio3d)
- JSR 234 Advanced Multimedia Supplements 1.0 (music)
- Nokia UI API 1.1
  - Maximum JAR file size is around 1 MB.
  - Maximum RAM for Java applications is 2048 kB (crash with "Out of Memory" error if you run a Java application that need more than 2048 kB).

=== Browsing ===
- Nokia Built-in browser.
- Opera Mini 7(also known as Next) & Lower
- UC Browser 8.2 & Lower

=== Sales package contents ===
- Nokia 2730 classic
- Nokia battery BL-5C
- Nokia 1 GB microSD card
- Nokia Connectivity Cable CA-100 (on some countries only)
- Nokia Stereo Headset WH-102/HS-125
- Nokia Compact Charger AC-3
- User Guide

=== Operating system ===
- Nokia OS - Series 40
