= Nokia 2700 classic =

2009 cell phone model

Nokia 2700 Classic
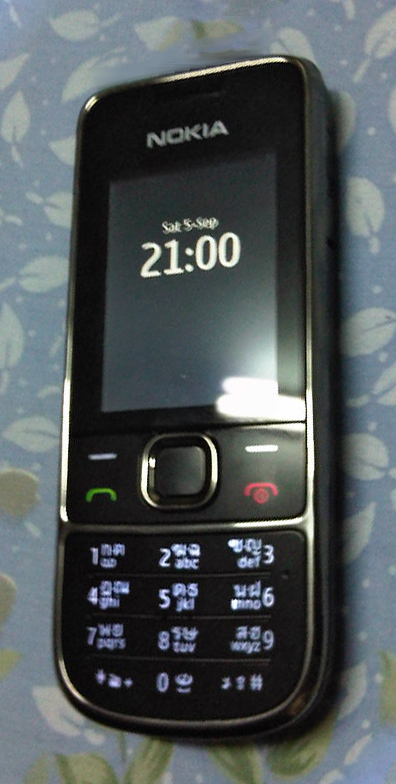
- Manufacturer: Nokia
- Series: Nokia 2000 series
- Availability by region: July 2009
- Predecessor: Nokia 2630
- Successor: Nokia C2-01
- Related: Nokia 2690; Nokia 2730 classic
- Compatible networks: GSM, GPRS
- Form factor: Candybar
- Dimensions: 109.2×46.9×14.4 mm (4.30×1.85×0.57 in)
- Weight: 85 g (3 oz) (with battery)
- Operating system: Series 40 5th Edition Feature pack 1
- CPU: Advanced Risc Machines ARM926EJ-S A ~203 MHz single core
- Memory: 32 MB
- Storage: 64 MB
- Removable storage: MicroSD, max 2 GB
- SIM: 1 SIM
- Battery: BL-5C, 1020 mAh Talk time: Up to 6 hrs 25 mins(GSM), Stand-by: Up to 299 hrs (GSM)
- Charging: 5V 350mA 2.0 mm thin barrel connector
- Rear camera: 2 MP
- Display: 2 inch, 262,144 color, 240×320 px, TFT
- Connectivity: Bluetooth, USB
- Data inputs: Numeric Keypad

The Nokia 2700 classic (often called Nokia 2700c) is a Nokia quad-band GSM cell phone. It has a camera, FM radio, bluetooth connectivity, multimedia playback, and several internet-based applications (web browser, e-mail client, and instant messaging). It is assembled in Romania.

== Technical specifications ==
=== Hardware specifications ===
The hardware specifications of the Nokia 2700 classic include a 203 Mhz CPU ARM processor, 32 megabytes of RAM and 64 megabytes of flash memory with 32MB of user storage an 2MB of JAVA 2 micro edition heap. It supports any SD card up to 2 gigabytes (as of 2009) with a maximum memory support up to 16 gigabytes (as of 2017), as well as multimedia playback support (on music and video). There is a 5-way "Multi-Navi" key support for multityping and a 240 by 320 LCD.

=== Key features ===
The Nokia 2700 classic has a 2 MP digital camera with a 1600 by 1200 px landscape mode, a 1200 by 1600 px portrait mode, a 176 by 144 px MPEG-4 and h.263 video recorder. It supports MP3 files, ringtones, and user-recorded ringtones (.wav files and voice recorders) as well as an FM radio and Bluetooth 2.0. It also has SMS, MMS, email, and Nokia Xpress audio messaging in earlier models, with speech recognition only on certain models. There is 32 megabytes of internal dynamic memory, a microSD memory card with hot swap (maximum 16 gigabytes), but when put 128GB Fat32 format into Nokia 2700 classic can use it.

=== Operating frequency ===
The operation frequency of the Nokia 2700 classic is Quad Band GSM 850/900/1800/1900.

=== Dimensions ===
The Nokia 2700 classic has a volume of 62 cubic centimeters, with a weight of 85 grams with battery and a length and width of 109.2 millimeters and 46 millimeters, respectively. It has a thickness of 14 millimeters.

=== Display ===
The display is 2 inches (5 cm) with 262,144 colors and a TFT display. It is 240 by 320 pixels.

=== Imaging ===
The imaging hardware is a 2 MP camera (1600 by 1200 pixels, 176 by 144 for video).

=== Multimedia ===
OPEN GL ES 1.1 graphics are accelerated for games in 3D. There is a AMR, AMR-WB, MIDI, MXMF, MP3, AAC, MP4/M4A/3GP/3GA (AAC, AAC+, eAAC+, AMR, AMR-WB), X-Tone, WAV (PCM, a-law, mu-law, ADPCM), WMA (WMA9, WMA10) video player, as well as a voice recorder and an FM radio with RDS support.

=== Messaging ===
Emailing on the Nokia 2700 classic supports POP3, IMAP4, and SMTP protocols. SMS and MMS texting with pictures is supported. Saving messages is supported.

=== Java applications ===
MMS 1.3 is included, supporting a size of 595 kilobytes. Some other applications include Nokia Xpress Audio Messaging, Facebook 3.2 lite, Opera Mini 4.2 which is upgradable to Opera Mini 8.1, UC Browser (9.5), Games Rally 3D, Snake III, Diamond Rush and Sudoku. Google Maps 2.3v is also installed and the Nokia 2700 classic supports J2ME applications.

=== Connectivity ===
Photo and data sharing with Bluetooth 2.0 and USB 2.0 is supported.

=== Browsing ===
The two browsers available are Opera Mini 4.2 browser and UC Browser 7.1 browser, upgradeable to 8.1 and 9.5 respectively.

=== Power management ===
The battery is a BL-5C lithium-ion battery, which when charged lasts up to 6 hours and 25 minutes. It has a mAh capacity of 1020.

=== Sales package contents ===
The sales package contains the Nokia 2700 classic, the battery, the microSD (1 x 1 GB), the Nokia Stereo Headset WH-102, the AC-3 Nokia Compact Charger, and a user guide.

=== Operating system ===
The operating system is a Java Certified SUN JAVA (Microsystems edition) and JVM (Java virtual memory), MIDP 2.1 CLDC 1.1 Series 40 v5 and Nokia UI 9.98v.

== See also ==
- List of Nokia products
