= Nokia Asha 303 =

Mobile phone developed by Nokia

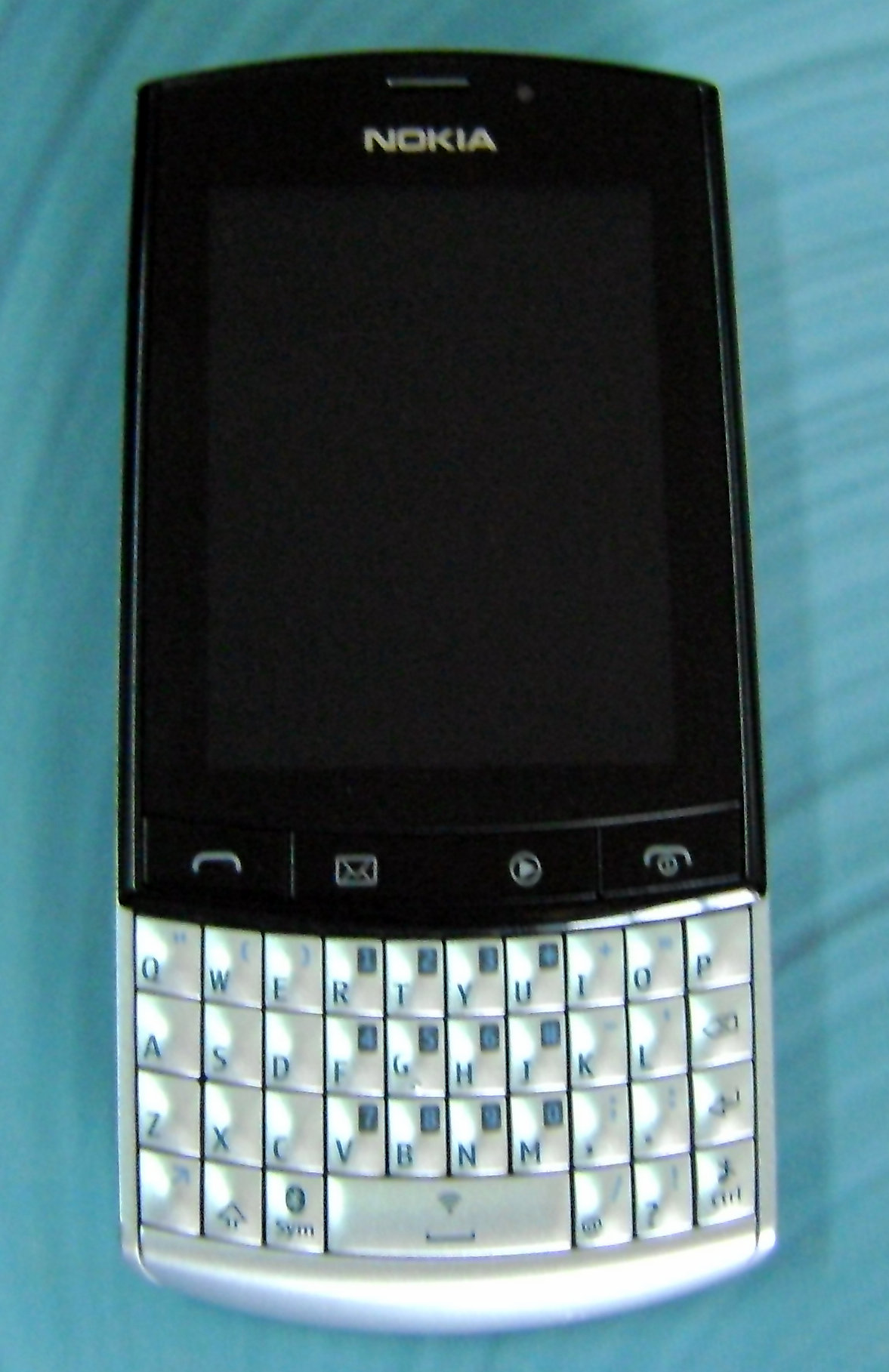
- Manufacturer: Nokia
- Series: Touch & Type
- First released: November 2011
- Availability by region: December 2011(China, Eurasia, Europe, India, Latin America and Middle East)
- Predecessor: Nokia X3 Touch and Type
- Successor: Nokia Asha 311; Nokia Lumia 520; Nokia X/XL/X2
- Related: Nokia Asha 300
- Compatible networks: GSM 850 / 900 / 1800 / 1900; GPRS/EDGE class B, multislot class 33; UMTS 850 / 900 / 1700 / 1900 / 2100; HSDPA Cat9, 10.2 Mbps; HSUPA Cat5 2.0 Mbps
- Form factor: Qwerty candybar
- Dimensions: Width: 55.7 mm; Height: 116.5 mm; Thickness: 13.9 mm
- Weight: 99 g (3 oz)
- Operating system: Nokia Asha Series 40 OS
- CPU: 1 GHz ARM11
- Memory: 128 MB RAM; 256 MB ROM
- Storage: 170 MB internal NAND memory (100 MB available to end user)
- Removable storage: up to 32 GB microSDHC
- Battery: BP-3L 1300 mAh Li-Ion battery (removable); micro USB and 2 mm DC plug charging
- Rear camera: 3.2 MP (CMOS sensor) EDoF
- Front camera: No
- Display: transmissive LCD 320 x 240 px (QVGA), 2.6" (66 mm), 18 bits
- Connectivity: WLAN IEEE 802.11 b/g/n (2.4 GHz); bluetooth 2.1 +EDR; micro USB 2.0; USB On-the-Go 1.3; 3.5 mm AV connector (audio in/out); SIM card; FM receiver with RDS
- Data inputs: Capacitive single-touch display; QWERTY keyboard; External functional hardware keys
- Development status: Released 2012

The Nokia Asha 303 is a Series 40 feature phone released by Nokia as part of the Nokia Asha family. It was announced at Nokia World 2011 in London along with three others Asha phones - the Nokia Asha 200, 201 and 300. The 303 is considered to be the flagship of the Asha family. Its main features are the QWERTY keyboard and capacitive touchscreen (marketed as "Touch and Type"), penta-band 3G network, SIP VoIP over 3G and Wi-Fi and the ability to play Angry Birds which were all never seen before on a Series 40 phone. Nokia Asha 303 is available in a number of languages depending on which territory it is marketed for. Models sold in South Asia support at least eight languages: English, Hindi, Gujarati, Marathi, Tamil, Kannada, Telugu and Malayalam.

== History and availability ==
The Nokia Asha 303 was announced at Nokia World 2011 in London. It will be available shortly in China, Eurasia, Europe, India, Latin America, Middle East and Southeast Asian markets. The phone will be sold at a price of €115 subject to taxes and subsidies.

== Hardware ==
=== Processors ===
The Nokia Asha 303 is powered by the same 1 GHz ARM11 processor found in Symbian Belle phones such as the Nokia 500, 600 and 700 but lack the dedicated Broadcom GPU which is not supported by the Nokia Series 40 operating system. The system also has 128 MB of low power single channel RAM (Mobile DDR).

=== Screen and input ===
The Nokia Asha 303 has a 2.6-inch (66 mm) transmissive LCD capacitive touchscreen (1 point) with a resolution of 320 × 240 pixel (QVGA, 154 ppi). In contrast with the Nokia C3-00, the screen of the Asha 303 is taller than wider (portrait). According to Nokia it is capable of displaying up to 262 thousands colors. The device also has a backlit 4-row keyboard with regional variant available (QWERTY, AZERTY, etc. ...).

The back camera has an extended depth of field feature (no mechanical zoom), no flash and has a 4× digital zoom for both video and camera. The sensor size of the back camera is 3.2-megapixel (2048 x 1536 px), has a f/2.8 aperture and a 50 cm to infinity focus range. It is capable of video recording at up to 640 x 480 px at 15 fps with mono sound.

=== Buttons ===
On the front of the device, above the 4-row keyboard, there the answer/call key, the messaging key which brings up an onscreen menu (instant messaging and e-mail), the music key which also brings up an onscreen menu (last song/rewind, play/pause, next song/fast forward) and the end call/close application key. On the right side of the device there are the volume rocker and the lock/unlock button. A long press on the space bar brings up the wireless network menu.

=== Audio and output ===
The Nokia Asha 303 has one microphone and a loudspeaker, which is situated on the back of the device below the anodized aluminum battery cover. On the top, there is a 3.5 mm AV connector which simultaneously provides stereo audio output and microphone input. Between the 3.5 mm AV connector and the 2 mm charging connector, there is a High-Speed USB 2.0 USB Micro AB connector provided for data synchronization, battery charging and supports for USB On-The-Go 1.3 (the ability to act as a USB host) using a Nokia Adapter Cable for USB OTG CA-157 (not included upon purchase).

The built-in Bluetooth v2.1 +EDR (Enhanced Data Rate) supports stereo audio output with the A2DP profile. Built-in car hands-free kits are also supported with the HFP profile. File transfer is supported (FTP) along with the OPP profile for sending/receiving objects. It is possible to remote control the device with the AVRCP profile. It supports wireless earpieces and headphones through the HSP profile. The DUN profile which permits access to the Internet from a laptop by dialing up on a mobile phone wirelessly (tethering) and PAN profile for networking using Bluetooth are also supported. The device also functions as an FM receiver, allowing one to listen to the FM radio by using headphones connected to the 3.5 jack as antenna.

=== Battery and SIM ===
The battery life of the BP-3L (1300 mAh) as claimed by Nokia is from 7 to 8 hours of talk time, from 30 to 35 days of standby and 47 hours of music playback depending on actual usage.

The SIM card is located under the battery which can be accessed by removing the back panel of the device. The microSDHC card socket is also located under the back cover (but not under the battery). No tool is necessary to remove the back panel.

=== Storage ===
The phone has 150 MB of available non-removable storage. Additional storage is available via a microSDHC card socket, which is certified to support up to 32 GB of additional storage.

== Software ==
The Nokia Asha 303 is powered by Nokia Series 40 operating system with service pack 1 for touchscreen devices and comes with a variety of applications:

- Web: Nokia (proxy) Browser for Series 40
- Conversations: Nokia Messaging Service 3.2 (instant messaging and e-mail) and SMS, MMS
- Social: Facebook, Twitter, Flickr, Orkut and instagram
- Media: Camera, Photos, Music player, Nokia Music Store (on selected market), Flash Lite 3.0 (for YouTube video), Video player
- Personal Information Management: Calendar, Detailed contact information
- Utilities: VoIP, Notes, Calculator, To-do list, Alarm clock, Voice recorder, Stopwatch
- Games: Angry Birds Lite (first level only, additional levels can be purchased on the Nokia Store)

The Home screen is customizable and allow the user to add, amongst others, favorite contacts, Twitter/Facebook feeds, applications shortcuts, IM/e-mail notifications and calendar alert.

The phone also integrate a basic form of finger gesture (marketed by Nokia as Swype), as first seen on the Nokia N9, to navigate the user interface. For example, on the homescreen, the user has to swipe their finger from the left side of the bezel surrounding the screen to the opposite side to bring up the application drawer. A swipe from the right side will bring up the calendar application; this can be configured to fit the user preferences.

The device comes with Nokia Maps for Series 40 and make use of cellular network for positioning as there is no GPS in the phone. Nokia Maps for Series 40 phones does not provide voice guided navigation and only allows for basic route (<10 km) to be plan. The software will provide step by step instructions, allows the user to see the route on a map and search for nearby points of interest. Depending on where the phone was purchased, regional maps (Europe, South America, etc.) are preloaded and, as such, an active internet connection to download map data is not required.

== See also ==
- List of Nokia products
