= Nokia 6275i =

Mobile phone model

- Manufacturer: Nokia
- Dimensions: 109×42.8×17.22 mm (4.291×1.685×0.678 in)
- Weight: 105 g (4 oz)
- Operating system: Nokia OS
- Memory: Up to 24 MB built-in memory
- Removable storage: MicroSD
- Battery: BL-6C
- Rear camera: 2 megapixels, qcif video (176 × 144) in either of two formats (h.263 or MPEG-4)
- Display: 240 × 320 resolution, QVGA 262k color
- Connectivity: BT, Infrared, USB
- Data inputs: Keypad

The Nokia 6275i is a CDMA mobile phone. It is essentially a "candybar" version of the Nokia 6265. It has a 2.0-megapixel camera with flash, and a portrait mirror. The phone has 21 MB of built-in memory, but is able to have its memory expanded with a 2 GB microSD card. It runs on the Nokia OS. Software applications for the phone were developed using the Series 40 (3rd edition) developer platform. It can connect to other devices using infrared, USB, and Bluetooth 1.2 technology. The screen has a 240×320 resolution.

The video recorder comes by default with QCIF (176×144 resolution) capability and can record as much video as can be stored on the microSD card. The default h.263 codec format uses approximately 1–1.5 MB of memory for each minute of recorded video. The format can be converted to a higher-quality MPEG-4 by using service centre software to adjust the internal settings.

Java applications are supported. If the carrier has disabled these, they can be enabled by adjusting the phone's internal settings to allow it to run Java MIDLets.

The phone's camera is sufficient for good-quality website photos. However, the camera has poor white adjustment and contrast adjustment.

The phone has a 4 pole audio port on its bottom side to allow for headphone and earphone connection. Accessories plugged into the audio port can be used as an antenna for the built-in FM radio, which can then be played back through the phone's speaker. However, when the earplug connection is in use, the Bluetooth earpiece function is disabled.

This phone was sold for around $200 as of September 2007. The only cell phone carrier in the United States to offer this product was Cricket, a Leap Communications company. The units that Bell Mobility and Solo Mobile sell are custom-made—it is impossible to configure a custom ringtone on these phones. However, they can be hacked using the Nokia USB cable (sold separately) and the Nokia Diego software.

The phone can also be hacked to allow the internal GPS to function with a Java-based GPS program, allowing it to act as a GPS unit with maps.
