= Nokia 3710 fold =

Mobile phone model

Nokia 3710 Fold
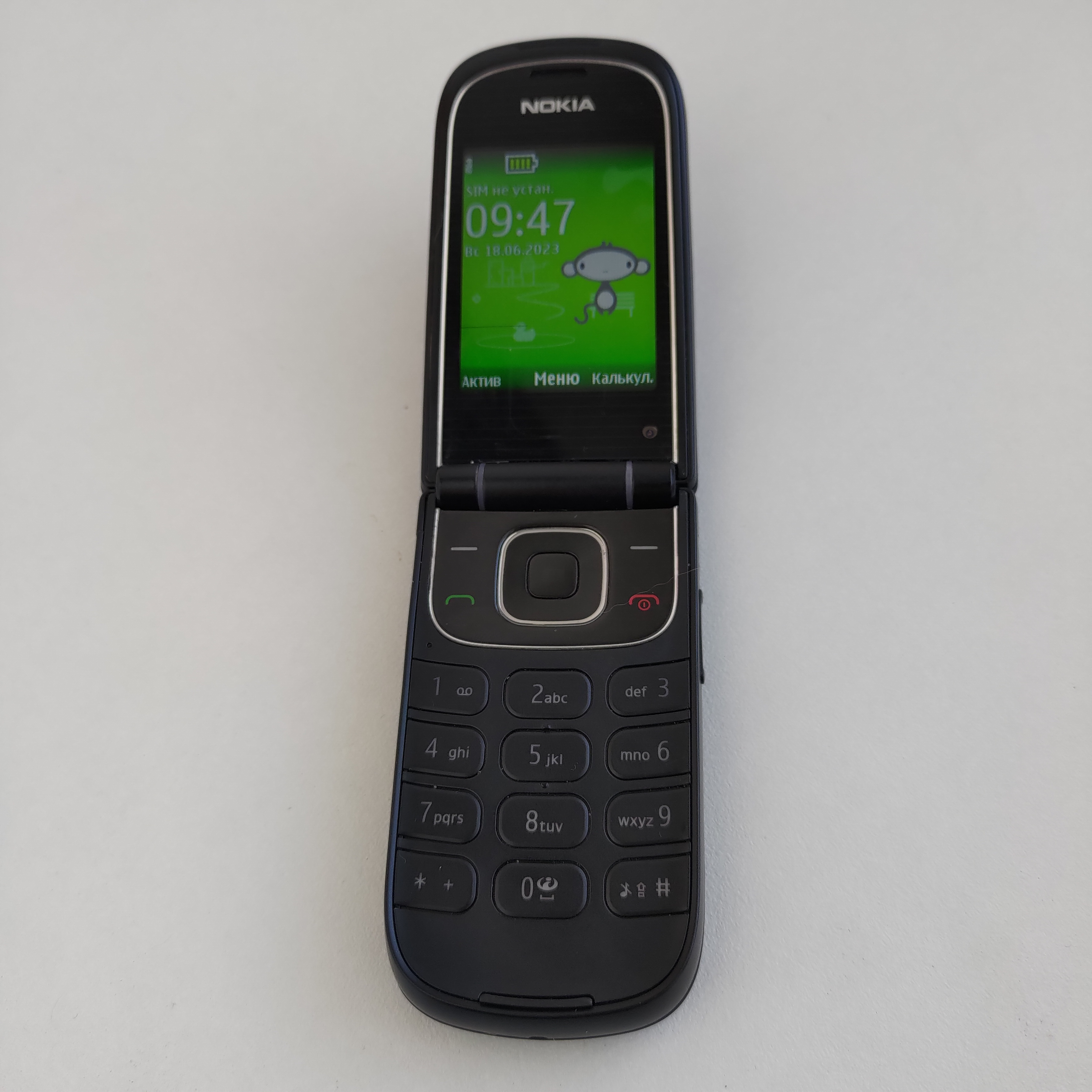
- Nokia 3710 black unfolded
- Brand: Nokia
- Manufacturer: Nokia Oyj
- Type: Feature phone
- First released: June 2009
- Availability by region: India December 2009
- Discontinued: 2011
- Predecessor: Nokia 3610 fold
- Compatible networks: 2G; 3G; GPRS: Class 32, 88 kbps; EDGE: Class 32, 296 kbits; Speed: 384 kbps
- Form factor: Flip
- Dimensions: 89 mm × 47 mm × 15.2 mm (3.50 in × 1.85 in × 0.60 in)
- Weight: 94 g (3.3 oz)
- Operating system: Nokia OS Series 40 6th Edition
- CPU: ARM11 369 mHz
- Storage: 70 Mb internal
- Removable storage: MicroSD (Expandable up to 8GB)
- Battery: Li-Ion 860 mAh battery (BL-4S) removable
- Rear camera: 3.2 MP, 2048 x 1536 pixels with LED flash
- Front camera: Yes, VGA video calling
- Display: TFT 2.2", pixel density 240X320, colors 16m
- Sound: 2.5mm jack
- Connectivity: Bluetooth v2.1; USB: Yes, microUSB v2.0
- Data inputs: keypad
- Website: www.nokia.com/support/nokia%203710%20fold

Nokia 3710 is a feature phone manufactured by Nokia. It was announced by Nokia in June 2009 and released in December of that year. It was hailed as the direct successor to the Nokia 3610 fold, the previous model launched at the end of 2008.

== Measurements ==
It measured 89 x 47 x 15.2 mm, 54 cc (3.50 x 1.85 x 0.60 in), 2.2 inches (~35.8% screen-to-body ratio) and weighed 94 grams. It had a resolution of 240 x 320 pixels (with ~182 ppi pixel density).

== Technical specifications ==
The phone had a memory of 2000 entries, and an internal memory of 70 MB. The primary camera featured 3.2 MP, LED flash and enhanced fixed focus. The secondary one was a VGA videocall camera. It had three different alert types: downloadable polyphonic, MP3 ringtones and vibration. It also featured a loudspeaker and 2.5 mm audio jack, A-GPS, Stereo FM radio (RDS), and a microUSB v.2.0. It also benefits from UMTS technology.

== Other features ==
The Nokia 3710 also had these features: SMS, MMS, Email, IM messaging capacity; WAP 2.0/xHTML, HTML, Adobe Flash Lite browsers, MIDP 2.1 - MP3/eAAC+/WAV/WMA player, MP4/WMV/H.264 player, Organizer, Voice command/dial/memo, Predictive text input and JAVA. It had a numeric keypad and soft keys. Available in black, pink and plum colors it had a music play length of up to 24 hours.
