= Nokia 6125 =

Mobile phone model

- Manufacturer: Nokia
- First released: January 2, 2006
- Form factor: Flip
- Dimensions: 3.54 x 1.81 x 0.93 in (90 x 46 x 23.6 mm)
- Weight: 3.46 oz (98 g)
- Storage: 11mb

Nokia 6125 is a Nokia clamshell phone. The phone was launched in the first quarter of 2006. It has been discontinued. The 6125 supports bluetooth and has a 1 megapixel camera.
