= Nokia C2-05 =

Mobile phone model

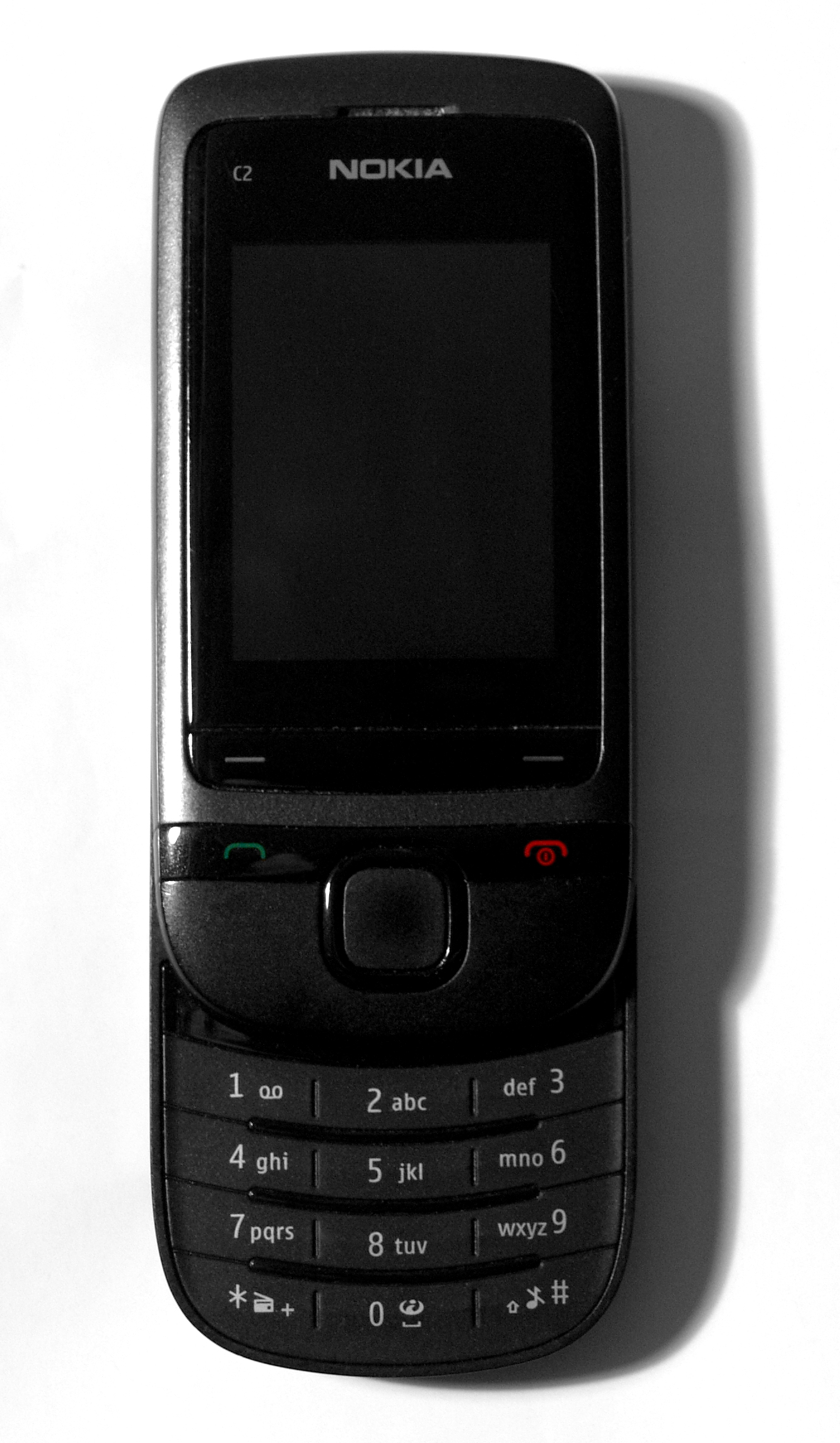
- Manufacturer: Nokia
- First released: 10 October 2011
- Availability by region: unknown
- Predecessor: Nokia 2220 slide
- Form factor: Slider phone
- Dimensions: 99.4×47.8×16.3 mm (3.91×1.88×0.64 in)
- Weight: 98.5 g (3.46 oz)
- Operating system: Series 40, SPR 10.4
- CPU: 208 MHz ARM1176
- Memory: 64MB ROM, 16MB RAM; 10MB user-accessible
- Removable storage: microSD expandable up to 32GB
- Battery: BL-4C, 860 mAH, Li-Ion, Stand-by 600hr, TalkTime 5hr
- Rear camera: 0.3 megapixels, VGA, 640x480px
- Display: 2.0 in (5.1 cm) TFT, 240x320 px, 65k color
- Development status: discontinued

Nokia C2-05 is a sliding model device running on Nokia's Series 40 mobile operating system. It was released in December 2011. It was also the last Nokia phone with sliding keypad ever released and the last in the Nokia Cseries line. The screen of the device is of 2.0 inches TFT with resolution of 240×320 pixels. Its battery BL-4C is of 860 mAh. The device is Bluetooth v2.1 enabled with A2DP and EDR. As of 2015 July, its cost in India is about Rs. 3340. Outside India it is sold for a cost of $74.22 approx.

== Special Features ==
It is available in 3 different colours, mainly - Pink, Dynamic Grey and Peacock Blue. It has the feature of predictive text input. It supports GPRS class 12, EDGE, Bluetooth and Internet access via WAP. But lacks features like 3G, Wi-Fi, IrDA. It has a VGA camera of 4X Digital zoom. The device has an internal memory of 10 MB, 16 MB RAM and 64 MB ROM. Also, the device is featured with expandable memory of 32 GB. It supports FM Recording and RDS. It can be connected to a PC via PC Suite or Mass Storage with its micro USB v2.0 port. The facility of photocalk is also present in this device.

== Software ==
The device is Java (J2ME) MIDP 2.1 enabled. It has Facebook and Twitter clients. The device also supports MP4, H263 playback. The sound playback of the device support MP3, AAC, AAC+ and eAAC+ format. It is equipped with Nokia Map, Nokia Store, Nokia messaging service and has preinstalled color themes. It is also java compatible.
