= Nokia C2-06 =

Mobile phone model

- Manufacturer: Nokia
- Availability by region: Q3 2011
- Related: Nokia C2-02; Nokia C2-03
- Compatible networks: GSM 900/1800
- Form factor: slider
- Dimensions: 103×51.4×17 mm (4.06×2.02×0.67 in)
- Weight: 118 g (4 oz)
- Operating system: Series 40 6th edition feature pack 1
- Memory: 10 MB ROM
- Battery: BL-5C 3.7 V 1020 mAh
- Rear camera: 2 megapixels
- Display: 2.4 inch resistive touch QVGA TFT (262 000 colors, 240x320 pixels)
- Connectivity: Bluetooth 2.1+EDR, Micro-USB

The Nokia C2-06 is a mobile phone manufactured by Nokia. This is the first mobile phone released by Nokia that possesses a touchscreen in a "slider" form factor. Previously released touchscreen devices from Nokia using Series 40 Operating System have been in "candybar" form factor.

== Features ==
The key feature of this phone is touch and type and Dual SIM. It means that the phone has touch screen and alpha-numeric (12 key) keyboard but no navigation or soft keys. Other main features include: a 2.0-megapixel camera, Maps, Bluetooth 2.1 + EDR, Flash Lite 3.0 and MIDP Java 2.1 with additional Java APIs. The PC suite of Nokia C2-06 is same to Nokia C2-06. Updated versions of Phone Software, Nokia PC Suite and Ovi Store are found easily.

== Specification sheet ==
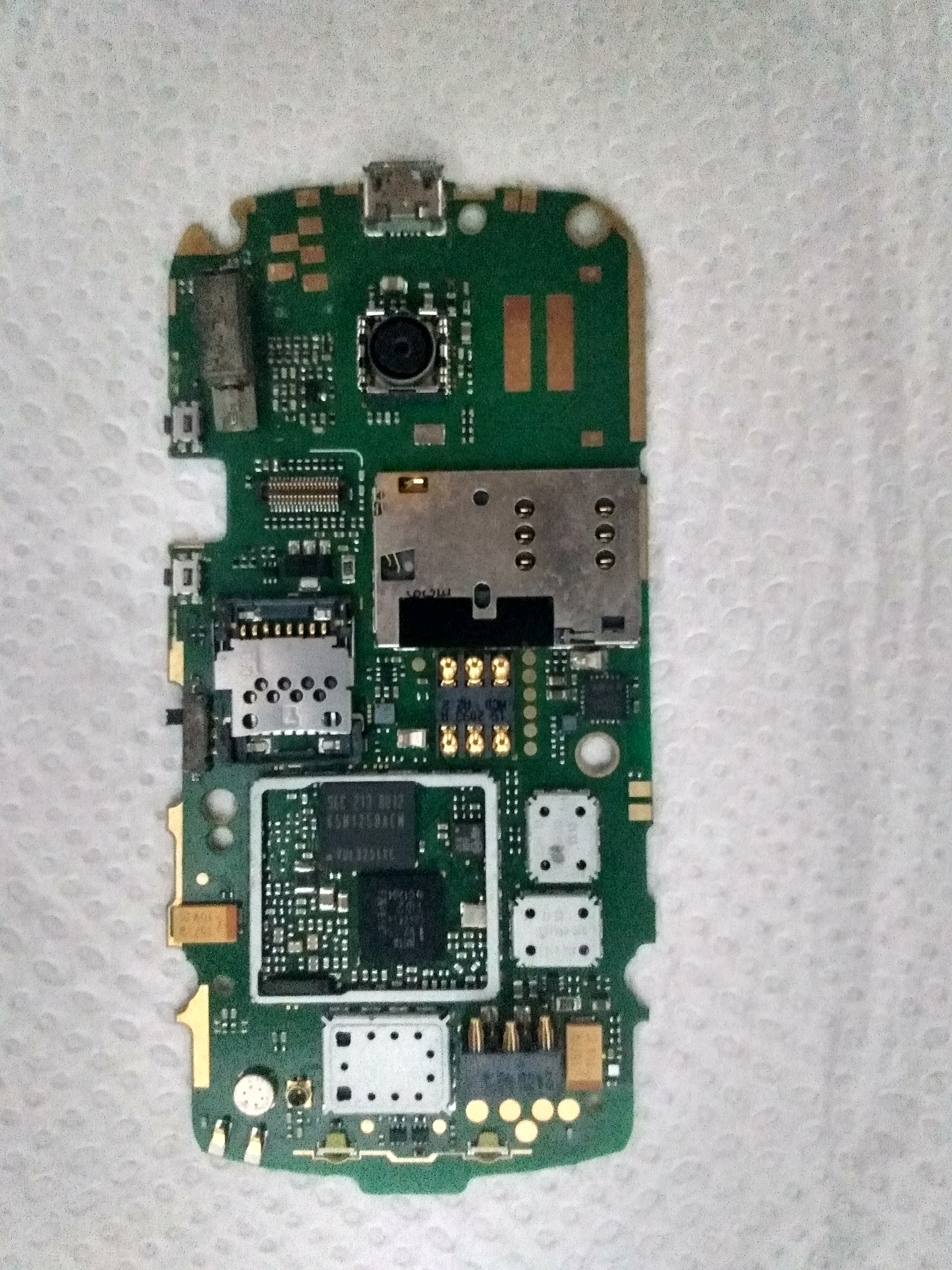
PCB of Nokia C2-06, without RF shield.

Type	Specification		
Modes	GSM 900 / 1800		
Regional Availability	Asia-Pacific, China, Eurasia, Europe, India, Middle East, SEAP		
Weight	118 g		
Dimensions	103 x 51.4 x 17 mm		
Form Factor	Slider		
Battery Life	Talk Time: 5 hours, Standby: 17 days		
Battery Type	BL-5C 3.7 V 1020 mAh		
Display	Type: TFT Colors: 262 000 (18-bit) Size 2.4" Resolution: 240 x 320 pixels (QVGA)		
Platform / OS	BB5 / Nokia Series 40, 6th Edition feature pack 1		
Memory	10 MB		
Digital TTY/TDD	Yes		
Multiple Languages	Yes		
Ringer Profiles	Yes		
Vibrate	Yes		
Bluetooth	Supported Profiles: DUN, FTP, GAP, GOEP, HFP, HSP, OPP, PAN, PBAP, SAP, SDAP, SPP		
PC Sync	Yes		
USB	Micro-USB		
Multiple Numbers per Name	Yes		
Voice Dialing	No		
Custom Graphics	Yes		
Custom Ringtones	Yes		
Data-Capable	Yes		
Flight Mode	Yes		
Packet Data	GPRS, EDGE (EGPRS)		
WLAN	No		
WAP / Web Browser	HTML over TCP/IP, WAP 2.0, Proxy Browser with Compression Technology, XHTML over TCP/IP		
Predictive Text Entry	T9		
Side Keys	volume keys on right		
Memory Card Slot	Card Type: microSD up to 32 GB.		
Email Client	Protocols Supported: IMAP4, POP3, SMTP supports attachments		
MMS	MMS 1.2 / SMIL		
Text Messaging	2-Way: Yes/Handwriting Recognition		
FM Radio	Stereo: Yes		
Music Player	Supported Formats: AAC, AAC+, AMR-NB, AMR-WB, eAAC+, MIDI Tones (poly 64), Mobile XMF, MP3, MP4, NRT, True tones, WAV, WMA		
Camera	Resolution: 2-megapixel (1600 x 1200)		
Streaming Video	No		
Video Capture	15 fps / 3GPP formats (H.263), H.264/AVC, MPEG-4, WMV		
Alarm	Yes		
Calculator	Yes		
Calendar	Yes		
SyncML	Yes		
To-Do List	Yes		
Voice Memo	Yes		
Games	Yes		
Java ME	Version: MIDP 2.1, CLDC 1.1 supported JSRs: 75, 82, 118, 135, 139, 172, 177, 179, 184, 205, 211, 226, 234, 248, Nokia UI API 1.1b (Includes Gesture API and Frame Animator API)		
Headset Jack	Yes (3.5 mm)		
Speaker Phone	Yes	Latest Firmware Version	06.97
