= Nokia Asha 300 =

Smartphone developed by Nokia

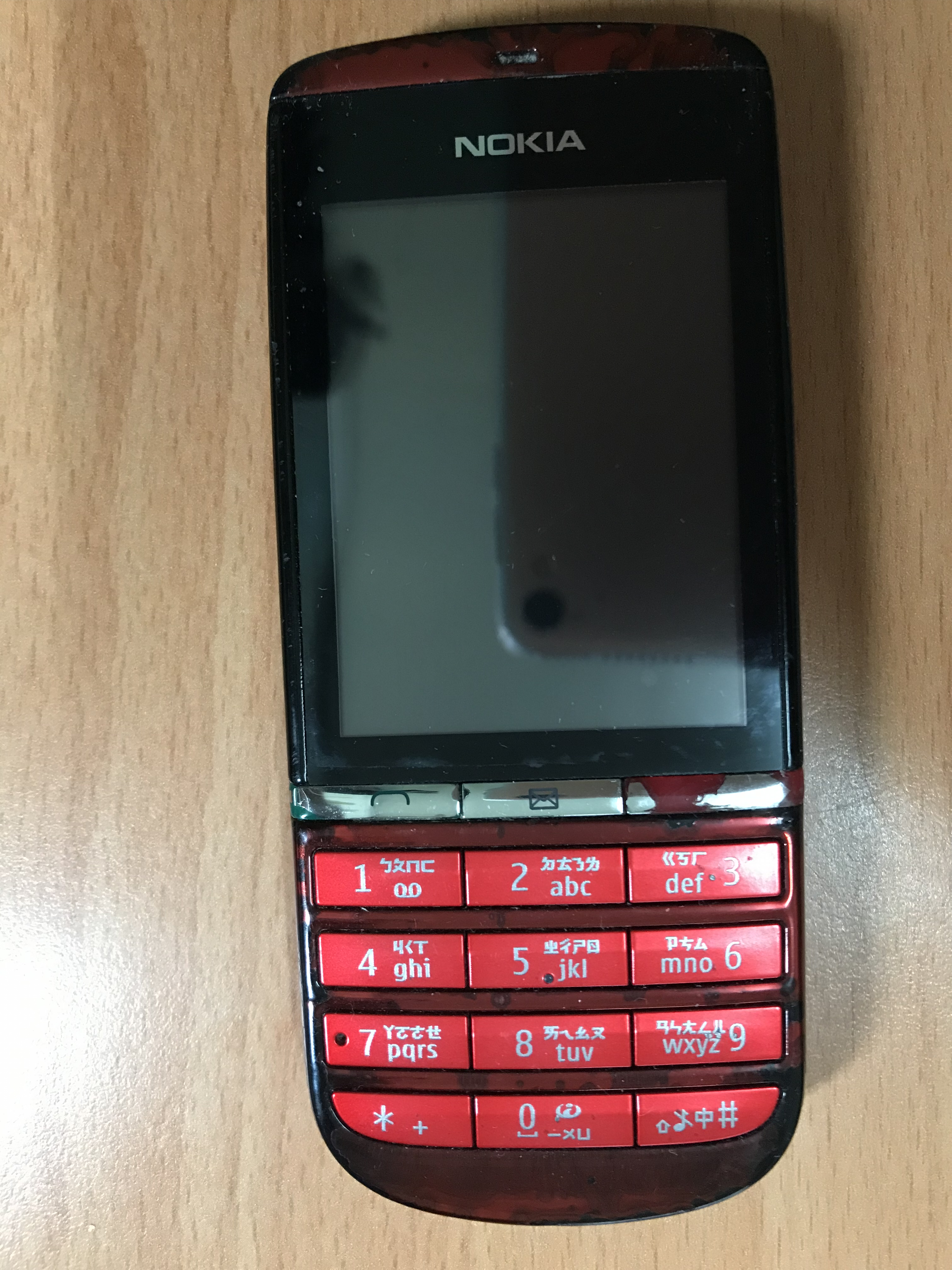
- Brand: Nokia
- Developer: Nokia Corporation
- Manufacturer: Nokia
- Type: Feature phone
- Series: Touch & Type
- First released: 26 October 2011; 14 years ago
- Availability by region: China, India, Eurasia, Europe, Latin America, Middle East, SEAP 14 November 2011
- Predecessor: Nokia C2-01; Nokia C3 Touch and Type
- Successor: Nokia Asha 301
- Related: Nokia Asha 303
- Compatible networks: WCDMA network: 850 MHz, 900 MHz, 1900 MHz, 2100 MHz; WCDMA max data speed DL: HSDPA - 10.2 Mbit/s; WCDMA max data speed UL: HSUPA - 2 Mbit/s; GSM network: 850 MHz, 900 MHz, 1800 MHz, 1900 MHz; GSM max data speed DL: EGPRS 296.0 kbit/s; GSM max data speed UL: EGPRS 236.8 kbit/s
- Form factor: Touch & Type
- Dimensions: 112.8×49.5×12.7 mm (4.44×1.95×0.50 in)
- Weight: 85 g (3 oz)
- Operating system: Nokia OS
- CPU: Series 40 Asha
- GPU: Not supported
- Memory: 128 MB
- Storage: 140 MB
- Removable storage: microSDHC, up to 32 GB
- SIM: miniSIM
- Battery: Battery model: BL-4U; Battery capacity: 1110 mAh; Battery voltage: 3.7 V; Maximum standby time: 24 days; Maximum talk time (2G): 6.9 h; Maximum talk time (3G): 4.3 h; Maximum music playback time: 28 h; Maximum video playback time: 6 h
- Charging: 2.0 mm Nokia proprietary charging up to 5W & microUSB charging (OTG)
- Rear camera: 5.0 MP (640 x 480 px) VGA
- Front camera: None
- Display: Contrast ratio: 856:1 (nominal)
- External display: None
- Sound: Nokia Music
- Connectivity: SIM card type: Mini SIM; Dual SIM: No; Charging connectors: 2.0 mm Charging Connector, Micro-USB; AV connectors: 3.5 mm audio connector; System connectors: Micro-USB-AB; Bluetooth: Bluetooth 2.1 + EDR; Bluetooth profiles: SIM Access Profile (SAP), Serial Port profile (SPP), Audio/Video Remote Control Profile (AVRCP) 1.0, General *Audio/Video Distribution Profile (GAVDP), Service Discovery Application Profile (SDAP), Phone Book Access Profile (PBAP) 1.1; Wi-Fi: No Wi-Fi; NFC: No NFC
- Model: RM-781
- Codename: Asha
- SAR: None
- Hearing aid compatibility: None
- Other: Available in graphite, night shade, gold, white silver, pink and red.

The Nokia Asha 300 is a cell smartphone which was first released in November 2011. Specifications include a 2.4-inch touch screen, 5 MP camera, Radio FM, MP3 support, a microSD memory card slot and a 24-day standby time, making it one of the leading phones on the market of its time for battery life.

== See also ==
- Nokia Asha 302
- List of Nokia products
