= Nokia C3 Touch and Type =

Nokia mobile phone

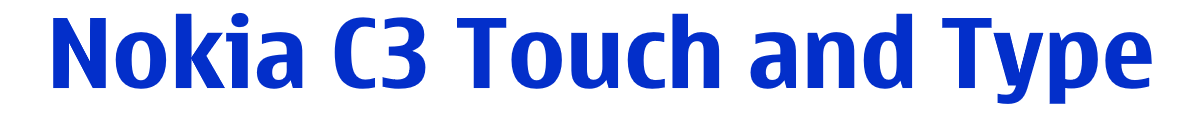

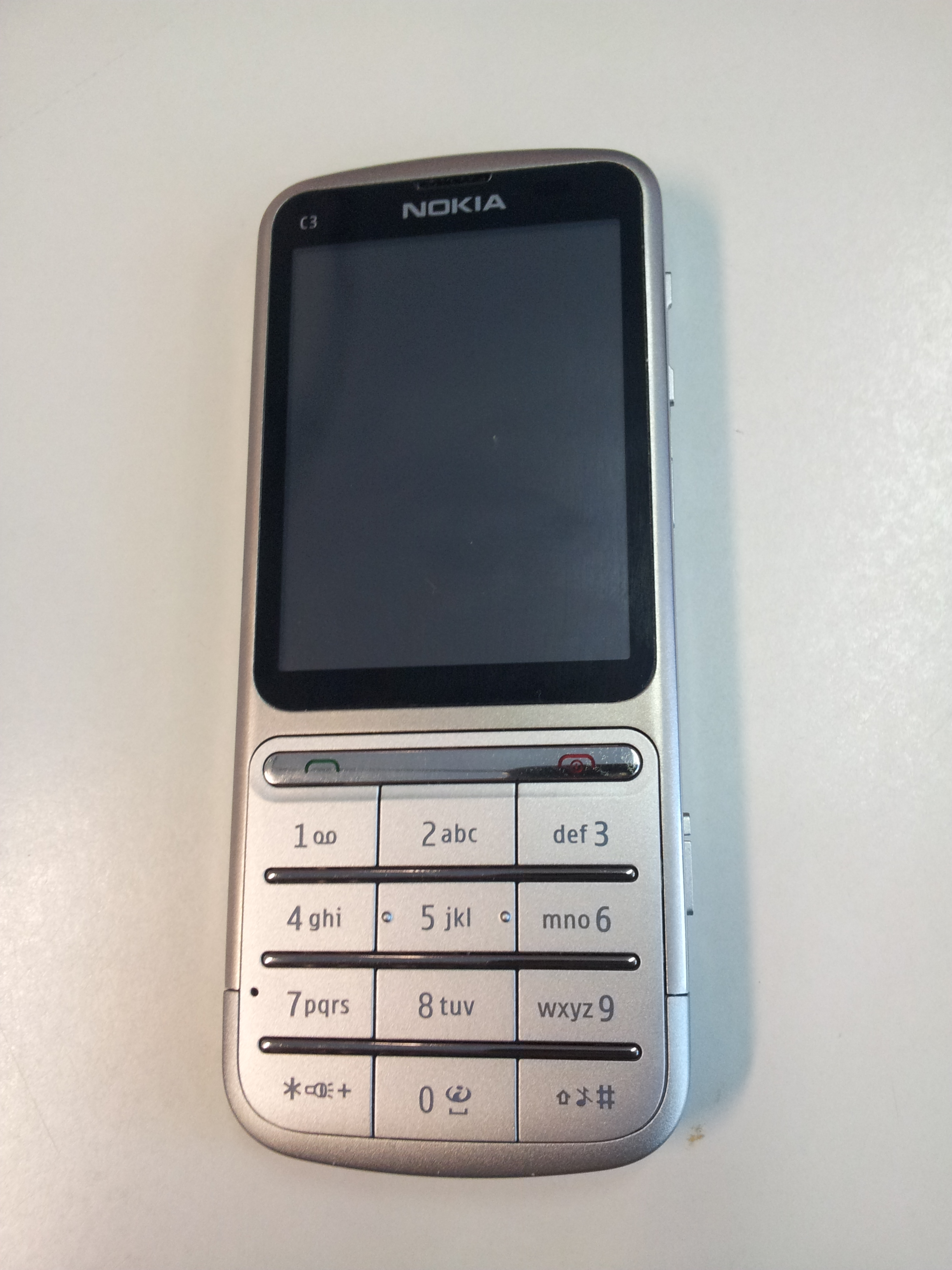
- Manufacturer: Nokia
- Availability by region: October 2010
- Predecessor: Nokia 6303; Nokia 6700 classic
- Successor: Nokia Asha 300
- Related: Nokia X3 Touch and Type
- Compatible networks: UMTS 850/900/1900/2100 MHz; GSM 850/900/1800/1900 MHz
- Form factor: chocolate bar
- Dimensions: 111×47.5×11 mm (4.37×1.87×0.43 in)
- Weight: 100 g (4 oz)
- Operating system: Series 40 6th edition feature pack 1
- Memory: 30 MB
- Battery: BL-5CT 3.7V 1050 mAh
- Rear camera: 5 megapixels, with 4 x digital zoom, full focus, flash
- Display: 2.4 inch resistive touch QVGA TFT (256K colors)
- Connectivity: Bluetooth 2.1+EDR, Micro-USB

The Nokia C3 Touch and Type also known as Nokia C3-01 is a mobile telephone handset produced by Nokia. This is the second mobile handset released by Nokia that possesses a touchscreen in a "candybar" phone form factor that runs the Series 40 operating system. The C3-01 was announced on 15 September 2010. It has a stainless steel body (like Nokia 6700 classic), a 2.4" display, and is high-specced for a Series 40 phone, featuring a 5-megapixel camera with flash, Wi-Fi and 3G.

There is also an hardware-upgraded version of the phone introduced on 23 July 2011, which can be identified from RM-776 and C3-01.5 codes in the sticker which can be found under the battery. The C3-01.5 (RM-776) differences compared to C3-01 (RM-640) are: 1GHz CPU vs 680 MHz CPU, 256 MB ROM vs 128 MB ROM and 128 MB RAM vs 64 MB RAM.

A luxury version of handset, known as C3-01 Gold Edition, was introduced on 23 August 2011. Technically and feature wise it is the same as C3-01.5.

== Features ==
The phone has a touchscreen and an ITU-T (12-key) keyboard but no navigation or soft keys. Other main features include WLAN, HSPA, VoIP with HD Voice [1], a 5.0-megapixel camera with flash, the WebKit open source browser, Flash Lite 3.0, Bluetooth 2.1 + EDR, and MIDP Java 2.1 with additional Java APIs. This phone also supports the USB On-the-Go function, which enables the phone to act as a USB host.

As the phone has no softkeys, it is unable to support many applications.

== Specification sheet ==
Type	Specification
Modes	GSM 850 / GSM 900 / GSM 1800 / GSM 1900 / HSPA 850 / HSPA 900 / HSPA 1900 / HSPA 2100
Regional Availability	Africa, Asia-Pacific, Brazil, China, Eurasia, Europe, Latin America, Middle East, SEAP, Ukraine, Russia, United States Of America
Weight	100 g
Dimensions	111 x 47.5 x 11 mm
Form Factor	Candybar
Battery Life	Talk Time: 5.6 hours (GSM), 3.4 hours (WCDMA) Standby: 17 days (GSM), 18 days (WCDMA)
Battery Type	BL-5CT 3.7V 1050 mAh
Display	Type: TFT Colors: 262 000 (18-bit) Size 2.4" Resolution: 240 x 320 pixels (QVGA)
Platform / OS	BB5 / Nokia Series 40, 6th Edition feature pack 1
Memory	64 MB
Digital TTY/TDD	Yes
Multiple Languages	Yes
Ringer Profiles	Yes
Vibrate	Yes
Bluetooth	Supported Profiles: A2DP, AVRCP, DUN, FTP, GAP, GAVDP, GOEP, HFP, HSP, OPP, PAN, PBAP, SAP, SDAP, SPP
PC Sync	Yes
USB	Micro-USB
Multiple Numbers per Name	Yes
Voice Dialing	Yes
Custom Graphics	Yes
Custom Ringtones	Yes
Data-Capable	Yes
Flight Mode	Yes
Packet Data	Technology: GPRS MSC 32 (RX+TX: 4+3, 3+2) (max 5 slots), EDGE (EGPRS): MSC 32 (RX+TX 4+3, 3+2) (max 5 slots), WCDMA 2100, maximum speed PS 128/384 kbit/s (UL/DL), CS 12.2 kbit/s, HSUPA maximum speed 2.0 Mbit/s, HSDPA maximum speed 10.2 Mbit/s (DL)
WLAN	802.11b (11 Mbit/s), 802.11g (54 Mbit/s), 902.11d (roaming issues), 802.11i (security issues, WEP, WPA, WPA2, EAP), 802.11e (QoS issues), 802.11n
WAP / Web Browser	HTML over TCP/IP, WAP 2.0, WebKit Open Source Browser, XHTML over TCP/IP
Predictive Text Entry	T9
Side Keys	volume keys on right
Memory Card Slot	Card Type: microSD up to 32 GB.
Email Client	Protocols Supported: IMAP4, POP3, SMTP supports attachments
MMS	MMS 1.2 / SMIL
Text Messaging	2-Way: Yes (no cut copy, paste facility)
FM Radio	Stereo: Yes
Music Player	Supported Formats: MP3, MP4, AAC, AAC+, eAAC+, WMA, WAV
Camera	Resolution: 5-megapixel (2592 x 1944) (Fixed-Focus) with 4x digital zoom and LED flash
Streaming Video	Protocol: 3GPP
Video Capture	QVGA, up to 20 frame/s, H.263 and MPEG4 format and VGA up to 15 frame/s, H.263 and MPEG4 Format
Alarm	Yes
Calculator	Yes
Calendar	Yes
SyncML	Yes
To-Do List	Yes
Voice Memo	Yes
Games	Yes
Java ME	Version: MIDP 2.1, CLDC 1.1 supported JSRs: 75, 82, 118, 120, 135, 139, 172, 177, 179, 184, 185, 205, 211, 226, 234, 248, 284
Headset Jack	Yes (3.5 mm)
Speaker Phone	Yes
Latest Firmware Version	07.58
