= Nokia X3 Touch and Type =

Smartphone handset produced by Nokia

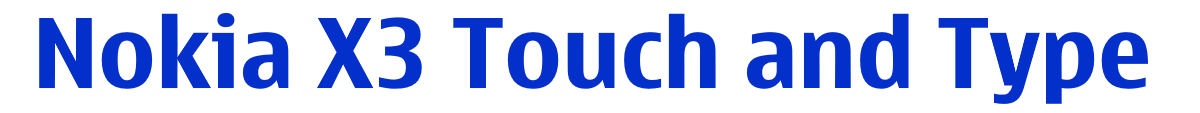

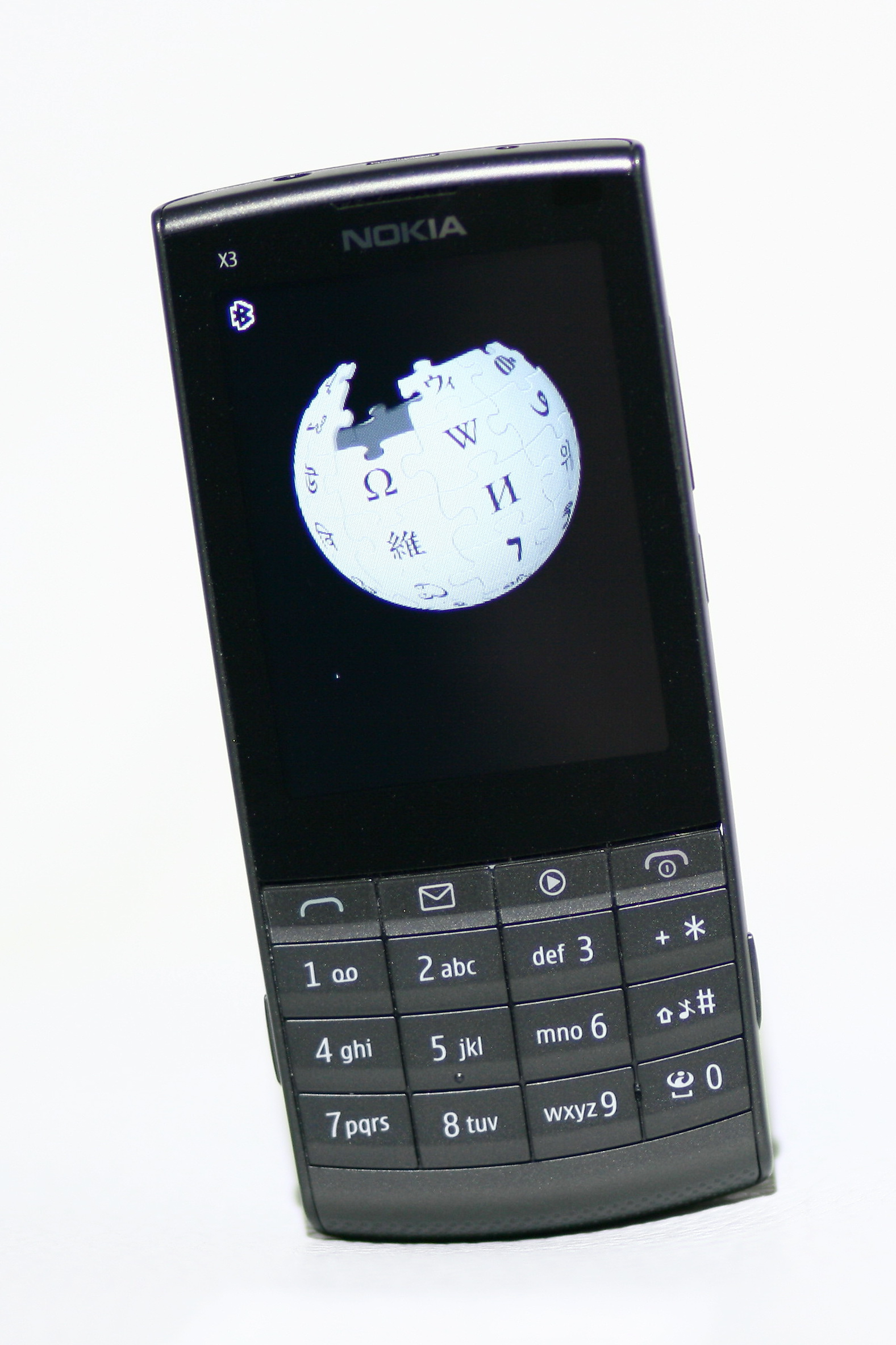
- Manufacturer: Nokia
- Availability by region: September 2010
- Predecessor: Nokia X3-00
- Successor: Nokia Asha 303
- Related: Nokia C3 Touch and Type
- Compatible networks: UMTS 850/900/1900/2100 GSM 850/900/1800/1900
- Form factor: Candybar (similar to Torch)
- Dimensions: 106.2×48.4×9.6 mm (4.18×1.91×0.38 in)
- Weight: 77.4 g (3 oz)
- Operating system: Series 40 6th Edition Feature Pack No.7 (S40 6th v7.5.1)
- Memory: 50 MB
- Battery: BL-4S 3.7 V 860 mAh
- Rear camera: 5 megapixels, with 4 x digital zoom, full focus
- Display: 240x320 pixels, 2.4 inch resistive touch QVGA TFT (262 000 colors)
- Connectivity: Bluetooth 2.1+EDR, Micro-USB

The Nokia X3 Touch and Type also known as Nokia X3-02 is a mobile phone handset produced by Nokia. This is the first mobile handset released by Nokia that possesses a touchscreen in a "candybar" phone form factor. It is also the first touchscreen handset from Nokia that runs the Series 40 operating system. Previously released touchscreen devices from Nokia have either not had a physical keyboard, or they have had a slide-out, full-QWERTY keyboard. It was introduced on 11 August 2010 as one of the most advanced Series 40 devices in terms of features and specifications.

There is also hardware upgrade version available of this phone, which can be identified from RM-775 and X3-02.5 codes in the sticker which can be found under the battery. The X3-02.5 (RM-775) differences compared to X3-02 (RM-639) are: 1 GHz CPU vs 680 MHz CPU, 256 MB ROM vs 128 MB ROM and 128 MB RAM vs 64 MB RAM.

== Features ==
The key feature of this phone is touch and type. It means that the phone has touch screen and alpha-numeric (12 key) keyboard but no navigation or softkeys. Other main features include: WLAN, HSPA, VoIP with HD Voice, a 5.0-megapixel camera, WebKit Open Source Browser, Flash Lite 3.0, Bluetooth 2.1 + EDR and MIDP Java 2.1 with additional Java APIs. This phone also supports the USB On-the-Go function, which enables the phone to act as a USB Host.

== Specification sheet ==
Type	Specification
Modes	GSM 850 / GSM 900 / GSM 1800 / GSM 1900 / WCDMA 850 / WCDMA 900 / WCDMA 1900 / WCDMA 2100
Regional Availability	Africa, Asia-Pacific, Brazil, China, Eurasia, Europe, Latin America, Middle East, SEAP, India
Weight	77.4 g
Dimensions	106.2 x 48.4 x 9.6 mm
Form Factor	Candybar
Battery Life	Talk Time: 5.3 hours (GSM), 3.5 hours (WCDMA) Standby: 18 days (GSM), 16 days (WCDMA)
Battery Type	BL-4S 3.7 V 860 mAh
Display	Type: TFT Colors: 262 000 (18-bit) Size 2.4" Resolution: 240 x 320 pixels (QVGA)
Platform / OS	BB5 / Nokia Series 40, 6th Edition feature pack 1
CPU	680 MHz (RM-639)
RAM	128 MB ROM, 64 MB RAM
Digital TTY/TDD	Yes
Multiple Languages	Yes
Ringer Profiles	Yes
Vibrate	Yes
Bluetooth	Supported Profiles: A2DP, AVRCP, DUN, FTP, GAP, GAVDP, GOEP, HFP, HSP, OPP, PAN, PBAP, SAP, SDAP, SPP
PC Sync	Yes
USB	Micro-USB
Multiple Numbers per Name	Yes
Voice Dialing	No
Custom Graphics	Yes
Custom Ringtones	Yes
Data-Capable	Yes
Flight Mode	Yes
Packet Data	Technology: GPRS MSC 32 (RX+TX: 4+3, 3+2) (max 5 slots), EDGE (EGPRS): MSC 32 (RX+TX 4+3, 3+2) (max 5 slots), WCDMA 2100, maximum speed PS 128/384 kbit/s (UL/DL), CS 12.2 kbit/s, HSUPA maximum speed 2.0 Mbit/s, HSDPA maximum speed 10.2 Mbit/s (DL)
WLAN	802.11b (11 Mbit/s), 802.11g (54 Mbit/s), 902.11d (roaming issues), 802.11i (security issues, WEP, WPA, WPA2, EAP), 802.11e (QoS issues), 802.11n
WAP / Web Browser	HTML over TCP/IP, WAP 2.0, WebKit Open Source Browser, XHTML over TCP/IP
Predictive Text Entry	T9
Side Keys	volume keys on right
Memory Card Slot	Card Type: microSD up to 32 GB.
Email Client	Protocols Supported: IMAP4, POP3, SMTP supports attachments
MMS	MMS 1.2 / SMIL
Text Messaging	2-Way: Yes
FM radio	Stereo: Yes
Music Player	Supported Formats: MP3, MP4, AAC, AAC+, eAAC+, WMA, WAV
Camera	Resolution: 5-megapixel (2592 x 1944) with 4x digital zoom
Streaming Video	Protocol: 3GPP
Video Capture	QVGA up to 25 frame/s, VGA up to 15 frame/s, H.263 and MPEG4 format
Alarm	Yes
Calculator	Yes
Calendar	Yes
SyncML	Yes
To-Do List	Yes
Voice Memo	Yes
Games	Climate Mission, Guitar Rock Tour 2, Hip Hop Tour, Memorize
Java ME	Version: MIDP 2.1, CLDC 1.1 supported JSRs: 75, 82, 118, 120, 135, 139, 172, 177, 179, 184, 185, 205, 211, 226, 234, 248, 284
Headset Jack	Yes (3.5 mm)
Speaker Phone	Yes
Latest Firmware Version	07.58
