= Nokia C2-01 =

Type of mobile phone

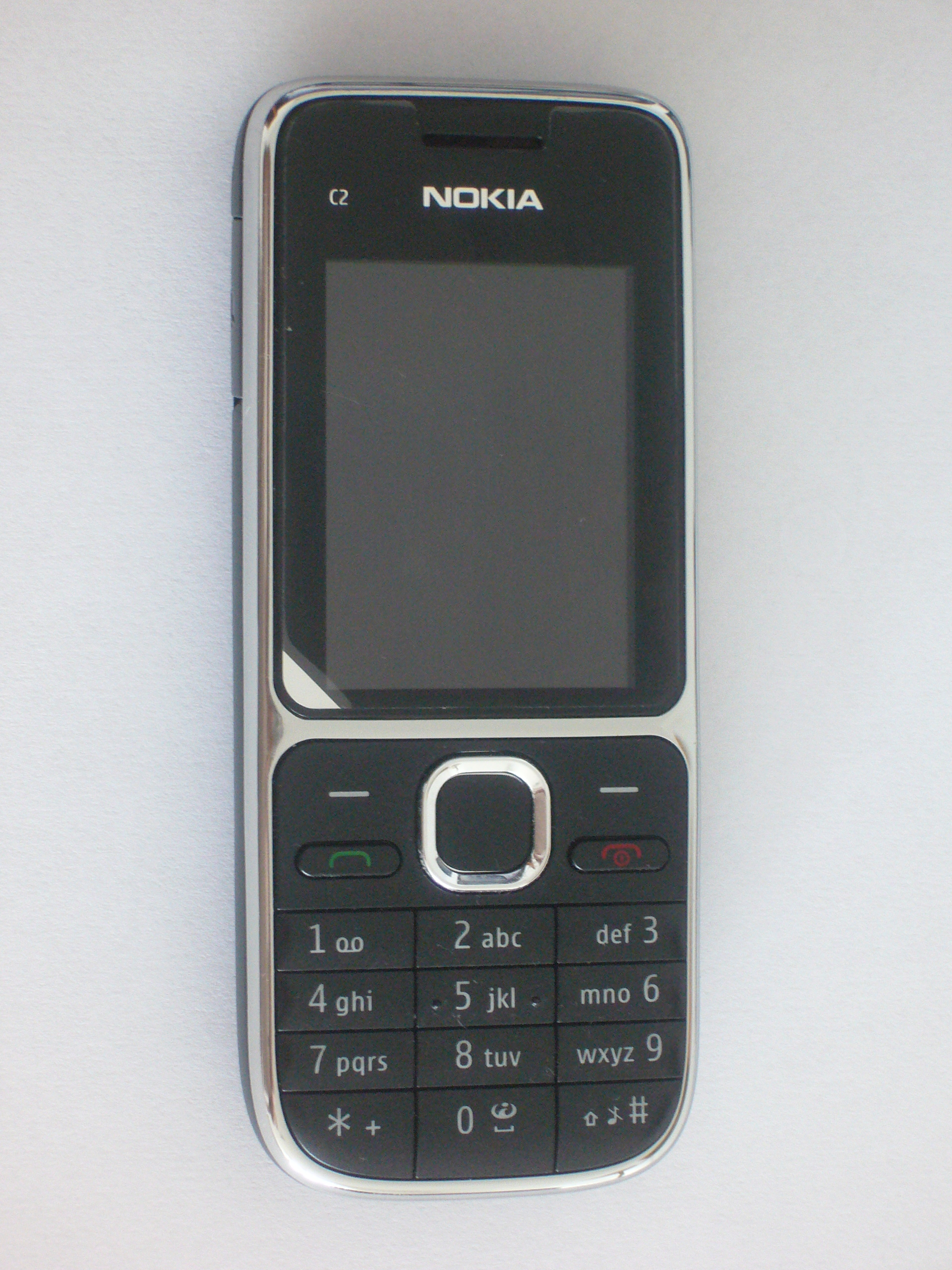
- Manufacturer: Nokia
- First released: February 2011; 15 years ago
- Availability by region: March 2011
- Discontinued: Q2 2013
- Predecessor: Nokia 2700 classic Nokia 2730 classic
- Successor: Nokia Asha 300
- Related: Nokia C1-01; Nokia C2-00
- Dimensions: 109.8 mm × 46.9 mm × 15.3 mm (4.32 in × 1.85 in × 0.60 in)
- Weight: 89 g (3.1 oz)
- Operating system: Series 40 6th edition
- CPU: 100MHz RAP3GS2v4
- Memory: 64 MB
- Storage: 125 MB
- Removable storage: microSD (up to 64 GB)
- Rear camera: 3.2 megapixel
- Front camera: NA
- Display: 2.0 in (51 mm)
- Connectivity: Bluetooth 2.1+EDR, Micro-USB

The Nokia C2-01 is a mobile phone produced by Nokia. The Nokia C2-01 supports 3G and has a 3.2 megapixel back camera. It has a single SIM card. The handset was introduced to the markets in 2011. It replaced its predecessor, the Nokia 2700 classic and Nokia 2730 classic and has improved specifications.

== Features ==
The Nokia C2-01 has a 3.2 megapixel back camera to capture images, as well as UMTS capabilities. It also has Bluetooth and supports J2ME applications (MIDP 2.1). Removing or replacing the battery wipes the memory requiring the phone to be reset manually for Date, time, etc. Also has some 3D capabilities.

== Specification sheet ==
Type	Specification
Modes	GSM 850 / 900 / 1800 / 1900 UMTS 900 / 1900 / 2100 (EU/Asia Version) UMTS 850 / 1900 / 2100 (American Version)
Regional Availability	Americas, China, Eurasia, India, Middle East, SEAP
Weight	89 g
Dimensions	109.8 x 46.9 x 15.3 mm
Battery Life	Talk Time: 8 hours (GSM) Standby: 400 hours (GSM)
Display	Type: TFT Colors: 256 000 (18-bit) Size 2.0" Resolution: 240 x 320 pixels
Platform / OS	BB5 / Nokia Series 40, 6th Edition
Processor	RAP3GS2v4 (100 MHz)
Motherboard	2MJK/2MJL
Energy management chip	EM ASIC N2200 (Avilma)
Internal storage	125 MB
Memory	64 MB DDR SDRAM
Digital TTY/TDD	Yes
Multiple Languages	Yes
Vibrate	Yes
Bluetooth	Supported Profiles: DUN, FTP, GAP, GOEP, HFP, HSP, OPP, PAN, PBAP, SAP, SDAP, SPP; via BTHFMRDS3.0 (N6000)
PC Sync	Yes
USB	Micro-USB
Multiple Numbers per Name	Yes
Custom Graphics	Yes
Custom Ringtones	Yes
Default Ringtones	Alablaster, Bespoke, Bicycle, Breeze, Buzzer, Cubes, Electronic, Equinox, Horizon, Imperial, In the mood, Jazz, Kalimba, Lumina, Marbles, Minima, Monkey drum, Mystique, Nokia tune, Passe-partout, Plinky kalinka, Ring ring, Roadie, Rosewood, Shimmy, Signum, Silver, Skysail, Subtile, Sun fun, Tender, Timer, Tinker, Topic, Trike, Violet, Westward, Xylophone
Data-Capable	Yes
Flight Mode	Yes
Packet Data	Technology: GPRS, EDGE
WLAN	No
WAP / Web Browser	HTML over TCP/IP, WAP 2.0, XHTML over TCP/IP
Predictive Text Entry	T9
Side Keys	none
Memory Card Slot	Card Type: microSD up to 64 GB
MMS	MMS 1.2 / SMIL
Text Messaging	2-Way: Yes
FM Radio	Stereo: Yes; via BTHFMRDS3.0 (N6000)
Music Player	Supported Formats: AAC, AAC+, AMR-NB, AMR-WB, eAAC+, MIDI Tones (poly 64), Mobile XMF, MP3, MP4, NRT, True tones, WAV, WMA
Camera	Resolution: 3.2 MP (2048 x 1536 px)
Streaming Video	Yes
Video Capture	QVGA, 15 fps / 3GPP formats (H.263), H.264/AVC, MPEG-4, WMV
Alarm	Yes
Calculator	Yes
Calendar	Yes
SyncML	Yes
To-Do List	Yes
Voice Memo	Yes
Games	Block'd, Bounce Tales, Brain Champ, City Bloxx, Diamond Rush, Snake III, Sudoku
Headset Jack	Yes (3.5 mm)
Speaker Phone	Yes
