= Nokia 8800 =

2005 cell phone model

Nokia 8800/8801
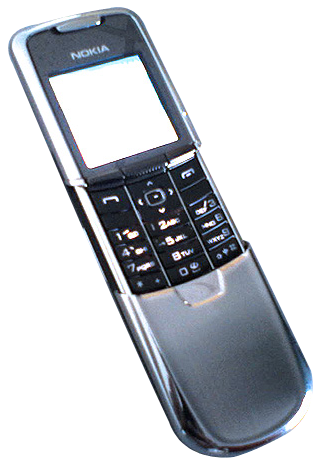
- Manufacturer: Nokia
- Availability by region: 2005
- Discontinued: 2010
- Predecessor: Nokia 8910i
- Successor: Nokia 8000 4G; Nokia 8600 Luna
- Related: Nokia 8 Sirocco
- Compatible networks: EDGE/GPRS/GSM; 900/1800/1900 MHz (8801: 850/1800/1900 MHz)
- Form factor: Slider
- Dimensions: 107 x 45 x 16.5 mm (4.2 x 1.8 x 0.6 inches)
- Weight: 134 g (5 oz)
- Operating system: Nokia Series 40
- Memory: 64 MB internal NAND flash memory
- Battery: Li-ion, 600 mAh
- Rear camera: SVGA (800 x 600 px)
- Display: TFT, 208 x 208 px, 262,144 colors
- Connectivity: Bluetooth

The Nokia 8800 (pronounced eighty-eight-hundred) is a luxury mobile phone produced by Nokia, based on the Nokia Series 40 operating system. The 8800 features a stainless-steel housing with a scratch-resistant screen and has a weight of 134 grams. According to Nokia, the 8800's "sophisticated slide mechanism uses premium ball bearings crafted by the makers of bearings used in high performance cars".

The Nokia 8800 was first introduced on 7 April 2005 and was commercially available in the United Kingdom in October 2005 on the O2 mobile phone network. The Nokia 8801 was introduced in North America and uses the frequencies predominant in North America of 850 MHz and 1900 MHz. In most respects the Nokia 8801 is identical to the Nokia 8800 other than the use of 850/1800/1900 MHz rather than 900/1800/1900 MHz on the Nokia 8800.

== Features ==
- Screen protected by scratch-resistant glass window.
- Integrated SVGA camera, with Video recording (H.263 QCIF format) and streaming.
- Active TFT display with 256K colors (208 x 208 pixels) with 3D image engine for enhanced graphics.
- Digital music player; can play MP3 and AAC audio.
- Device-to-device synchronization.
- Sliding keypad and screen with bi-stable spring mechanism and ball bearing tracks.
- Bluetooth wireless connectivity.
- Built-in FM radio.
- Can access EDGE networks.

The ringtones were composed by Ryuichi Sakamoto.

The 8800 comes with two BL-5X (600 mAh) batteries, with a manufacturer-specified talk time of up to 1.5–3 hours or up to 8 days standby time per battery. However, users found this was very optimistic and most users have to charge their phone several times a day.

== Nokia 8800 Sirocco Edition ==
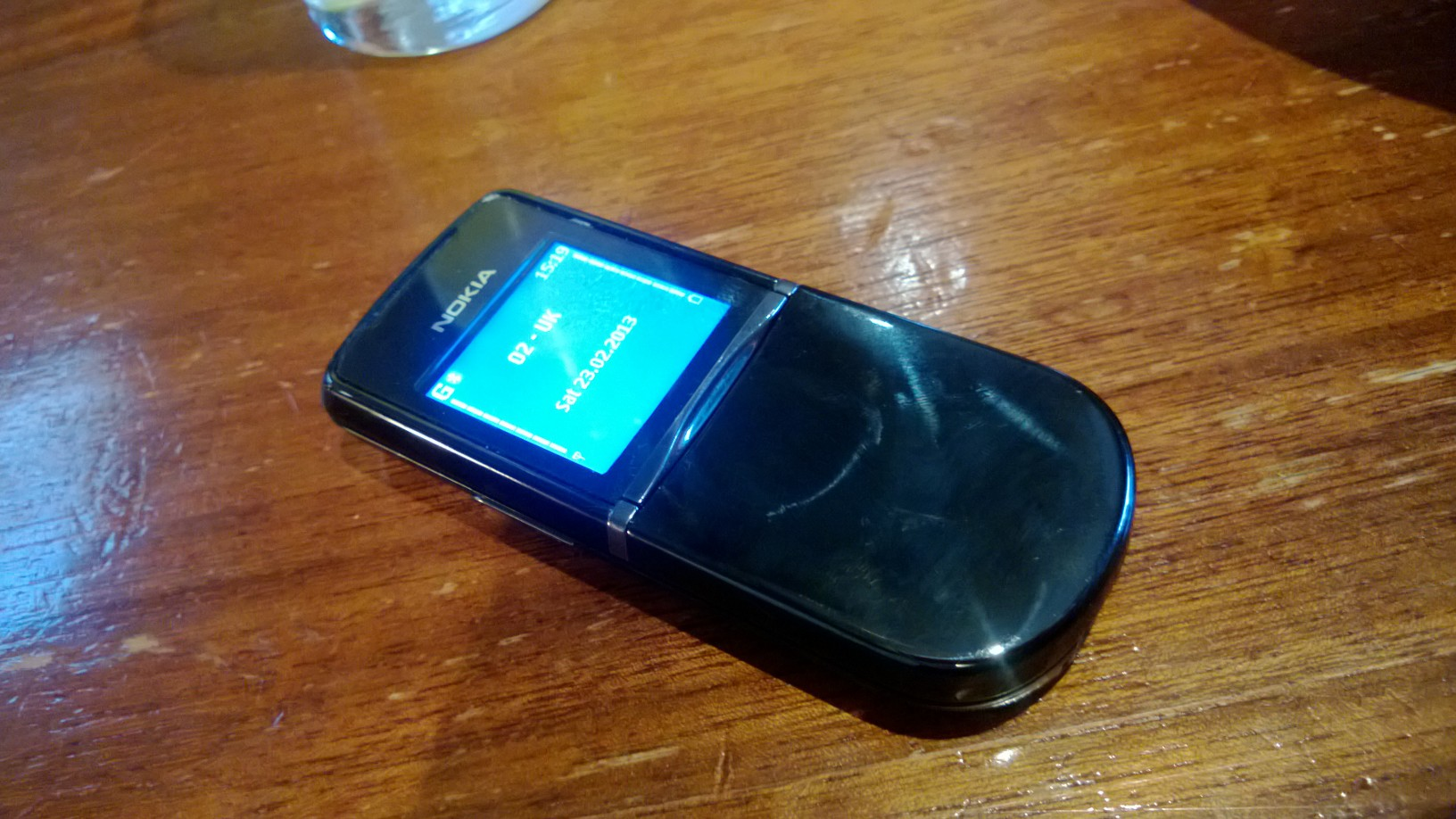
Nokia 8800

The Nokia 8800 Sirocco Edition (8800 redesigned fascia and in "gold" and "queen black", was released in 2006. This version of the phone has a 2-megapixel camera and slightly updated keypad layout. The phone chassis was slightly modified to include the upgraded 700mAH BP-6X battery. It features ringtones composed by renowned electronic musician Brian Eno, who also composed the Windows 95 startup sound.

In early 2007 Nokia released the 24ct gold plated version of the 8800 Sirocco, which became the most expensive phone (RRP $2049.00) in Nokia's catalogue of cell phone models up until the newest generation of mobile phones.

The Sirocco namesake was later used by HMD Global in 2018 for the flagship Nokia 8 Sirocco phone.

== Nokia 8800 Arte Edition (8800e) ==
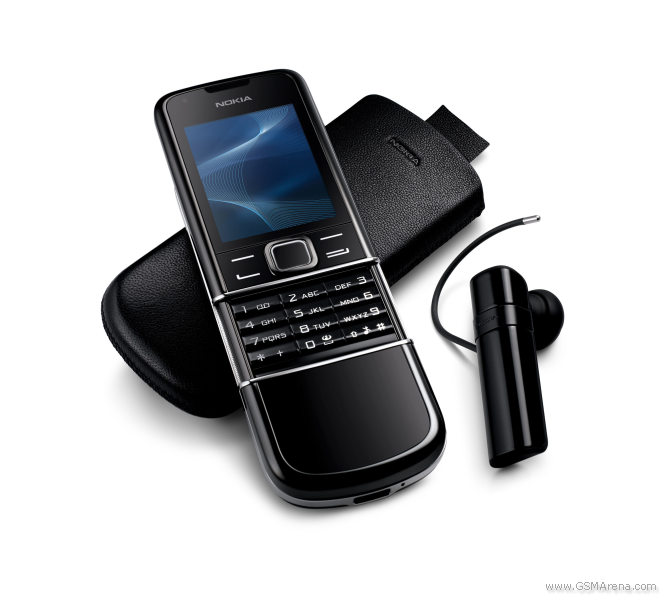
Nokia 8800

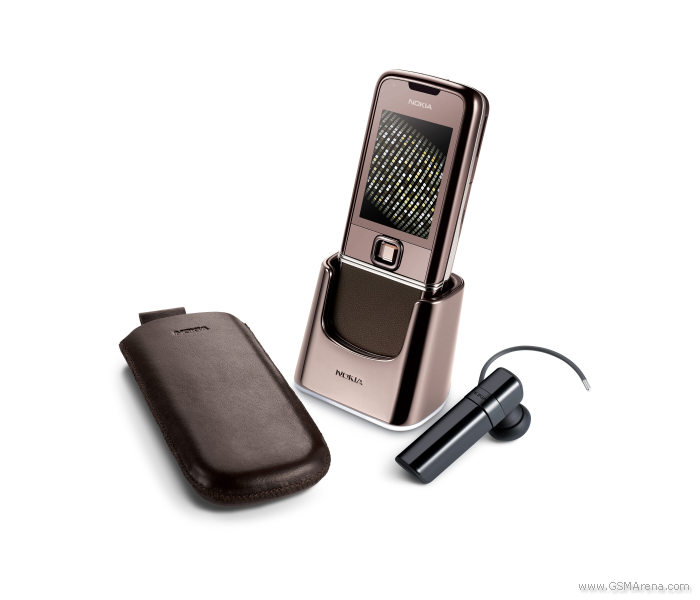
Nokia 8800

The Nokia 8800 Arte is an updated version of the 8800. It features a 2.0 inch scratch resistant OLED screen, a 3.15 MP camera with autofocus, and comes in four different models:

Model	Body	Internal Memory
Original Arte	stainless steel and is only available in black	1 GB
Sapphire Arte	stainless steel, leather and a sapphire stone replacing the navigation button	1 GB
Carbon Arte	stainless steel, carbon fibre and titanium	4 GB
Gold Arte	18K gold-plated body	4 GB

As with previous editions, it continues the trend of having ringtones composed by popular electronic artists, with the ringtones being composed by Austrian downtempo duo Kruder & Dorfmeister. Visuals were created by Fritz Fitzke.
