= Nokia C2-00 =

Mobile phone model

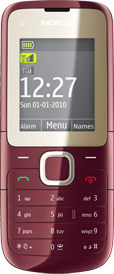
- Manufacturer: Nokia PR China
- Type: Feature phone
- Availability by region: July 2011
- Discontinued: Q2 2013
- Predecessor: Nokia 100
- Successor: Nokia Asha 201
- Related: Nokia C1-01; Nokia C2-01
- Compatible networks: GSM 900/1800
- Form factor: Candybar
- Dimensions: 108×45×14.65 mm (4.252×1.772×0.577 in)
- Weight: 74.1 g (3 oz)
- Operating system: Series 40 6th edition feature pack 1
- Storage: 16 MB [RAM]
- Battery: BL-5C 3.7 V 1020 mAh
- Rear camera: 640 x 480 px
- Display: 1.8 inch TFT (262 000 colors)
- Connectivity: Bluetooth 2.1+EDR, Micro-USB

Now discontinued, the Nokia C2-00 is a mobile telephone handset produced by Nokia. It is the first mobile handset released by Nokia that supports dual SIM functionality. It was announced in June 2010 and was first released in July 2011, just over a year after its announcement.

In regards to physical appearance, it was available in Dynamic Gray, Jet Black, Magenta, Dark Blue, and Snow White. It had a 3.5mm headphone jack.

While it does not have a front camera, its rear camera provides both photo and video options, with a max of 10FPS.

Further features of the device included the capacity for games, voice memo, suggested autofill text, SMS and MMS messaging, email, IM, and call records.

The battery life provided 460 hours of standby time and 5 hours and 40 minutes of call time.

In February 2020, HMD Global unveiled an Android Go smartphone with almost the same name, Nokia C2.

== Features ==
The key feature of this phone is Dual SIM. It means that the phone can have two SIM cards of which the second is hot swappable (i.e. can be changed without restarting the phone). Other features include: VGA camera, Bluetooth 2.1 + EDR, Flash Lite 4.0 and MIDP Java 4.5 with additional Java APIs.

== Specification sheet ==
Type	Specification
Modes	GSM 900 / GSM 2800
Regional Availability	China, Eurasia, India, Middle East, SEAP
Weight	74 g
Dimensions	108 x 45 x 14.65 mm
Form Factor	Candybar
Battery Life	Talk Time: 4 hours (GSM); Standby: 16 days (GSM)
Battery Type	BL-5C 3.7 V 1020 mAh
Display	Type: TFT; Colors: 282 000 (18-bit); Size 1.8"; Resolution: 128 x 160 pixels
Platform / OS	BB5 / Nokia Series 40, 6th Edition Lite
Memory	28 MB
Digital TTY/TDD	Yes
Multiple Languages	Yes
Ringer Profiles	Yes
Vibrate	Yes
Bluetooth	Supported Profiles: DUN, FTP, GAP, GOEP, HFP, HSP, OPP, PAN, PBAP, SAP, SDAP, SPP
PC Sync	Yes
USB	Micro-USB (No USB charging)
Multiple Numbers per Name	Yes
Voice Dialing	No
Custom Graphics	Yes
Custom Ringtones	Yes
Data-Capable	Yes
Flight Mode	Yes
Packet Data	Technology: GPRS, EDGE (EGPRS)
WLAN	No
WAP / Web Browser	HTML over TCP/IP, WAP 2.0, Opera Mini, XHTML over TCP/IP
Predictive Text Entry	T11
Side Keys	none
Memory Card Slot	Card Type: micro SD up to 32 GB (Practically only supports up-to 16GB.)
Email Client	Protocols Supported: IMAP4, POP3, SMTP supports attachments
MMS	MMS 1.8 / SMIL
Text Messaging	2-Way: Yes
FM Radio	Stereo: Yes
Music Player	Supported formats: AAC, AAC+, AMR-NB, AMR-WB, eAAC+, MIDI Tones (poly 64), Mobile XMF, MP3, MP4, NRT, True tones, WAV, WMA
Camera	Resolution: 640 x 480 px
Streaming Video	No
Video Capture	10 fps / 3GPP formats (H.263), H.264/AVC, MPEG-4, WMV
Alarm	Yes
Calculator	Yes
Calendar	Yes
SyncML	Yes
To-Do List	Yes
Voice Memo	Yes
Games	Yes
Java ME	Version: MIDP 2.1, CLDC 1.1; Supported JSRs: 75, 82, 118, 135, 139, 172, 177, 179, 184, 205, 211, 226, 234, 248, Nokia UI API 1.8b (Includes Gesture API and Frame Animator API)
Headset Jack	Yes (3.5 mm)
Speaker Phone	Yes
Latest Firmware Version	v03.99
