= Nokia C2-03 =

Smartphone model

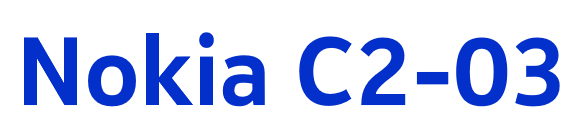

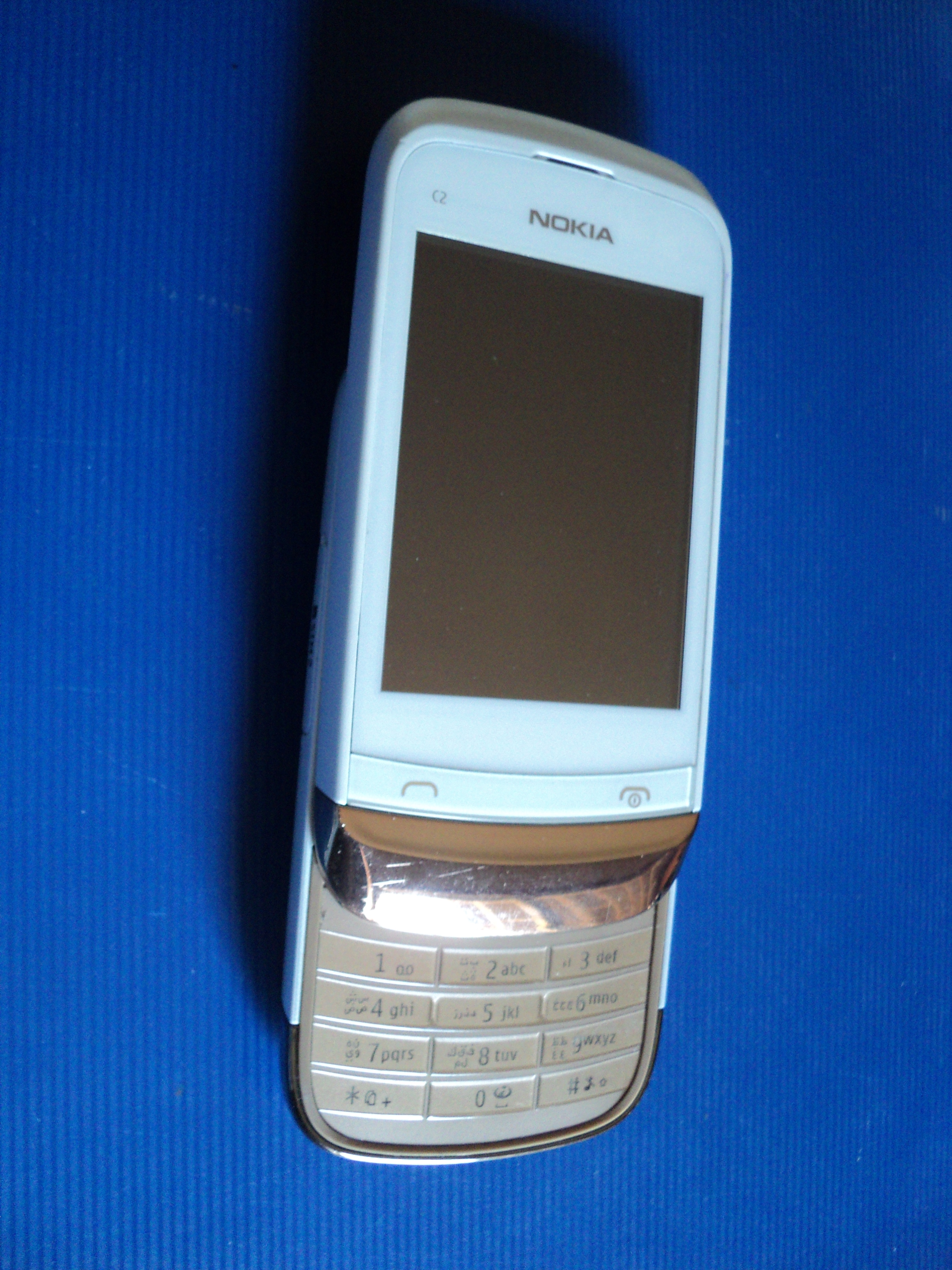
- Manufacturer: Nokia
- Availability by region: Q3 2011
- Predecessor: Nokia 2680 slide
- Successor: Nokia Asha 306
- Related: Nokia C2-02; Nokia C2-06
- Compatible networks: GSM 900/1800
- Form factor: slider
- Dimensions: 103×51.4×17 mm (4.06×2.02×0.67 in)
- Weight: 118 g (4 oz)
- Operating system: Series 40 6th edition feature pack 1
- Memory: 10 MB
- Battery: BL-5C 3.7 V 1020 mAh
- Rear camera: 2 megapixels
- Display: 2.6 inch resistive touch QVGA TFT (262 000 colors)
- Connectivity: Bluetooth 2.1+EDR, Micro-USB

The Nokia C2-03 is a mobile phone released by Nokia in 2011. This is one of the first mobile phones released by Nokia that possesses a touchscreen in a "slider" form factor (the other one being Nokia C2-02). Previously released touchscreen devices from Nokia using Series 40 operating system have been in "candybar" form factor.

== Features ==
The key feature of this phone is touch and type and Dual SIM. It means that the phone has touch screen and alpha-numeric (12 key) keyboard but no navigation or soft keys. Other main features include: a 2.0-megapixel camera, Maps, Bluetooth 2.1 + EDR, Flash Lite 3.0 and MIDP Java 2.1 with additional Java APIs.

== Specification sheet ==
Type	Specification
Modes	GSM 900 / 1800
Regional Availability	Asia-Pacific, China, Eurasia, Europe, India, Middle East, Pakistan, SEAP, Mauritius
Weight	118 g
Dimensions	103 x 51.4 x 17 mm
Form Factor	Slider
Battery Life	Talk Time: 5 hours, Standby: 17 days
Battery Type	BL-5C 3.7 V 1020 mAh
Display	Type: TFT Colors: 262 000 (18-bit) Size 2.6" Resolution: 240 x 320 pixels (QVGA)
Platform / OS	BB5 / Nokia Series 40, 6th Edition feature pack 1
Memory	10 MB
Digital TTY/TDD	Yes
Multiple Languages	Yes
Ringer Profiles	Yes
Vibrate	Yes
Bluetooth	Yes v2.1, A2DP Supported Profiles: DUN, FTP, GAP, GOEP, HFP, HSP, OPP, PAN, PBAP, SAP, SDAP, SPP
PC Sync	Yes
USB	Micro-USB
Multiple Numbers per Name	Yes
Voice Dialing	No
Custom Graphics	Yes
Custom Ringtones	Yes
Data-Capable	Yes
Flight Mode	Yes
Packet Data	GPRS, EDGE (EGPRS)
WLAN	No
WAP / Web Browser	HTML over TCP/IP, WAP 2.0, Proxy Browser with Compression Technology, XHTML over TCP/IP
Predictive Text Entry	T9
Side Keys	volume keys on right
Memory Card Slot	Card Type: microSD up to 32 GB.
Email Client	Protocols Supported: IMAP4, POP3, SMTP supports attachments
MMS	MMS 1.2 / SMIL
Text Messaging	2-Way: No/Handwriting Recognition
FM Radio	Stereo: Yes
Music Player	Supported Formats: AAC, AAC+, AMR-NB, AMR-WB, eAAC+, MIDI Tones (poly 64), Mobile XMF, MP3, MP4, NRT, True tones, WAV, WMA
Camera	Resolution: 2-megapixel (1600 x 1200)
Streaming Video	No
Video Capture	15 fps / 3GPP formats (H.263), H.264/AVC, MPEG-4, WMV
Alarm	Yes
Calculator	Yes
Calendar	Yes
SyncML	Yes
To-Do List	Yes
Voice Memo	Yes
Games	Yes
Java ME	Version: MIDP 2.1, CLDC 1.1 supported JSRs: 75, 82, 118, 135, 139, 172, 177, 179, 184, 205, 211, 226, 234, 248, Nokia UI API 1.1b (Includes Gesture API and Frame Animator API) Symbian S40
Headset Jack	Yes (3.5 mm)
Speaker Phone	Yes
Latest Firmware Version	07.65
