= Bounce (video game series) =

- Logo and title screen of the original Bounce
- Genre: Platformer
- Developers: Nokia, Rovio
- Publisher: Nokia
- Platforms: Mobile phone, J2ME, Symbian (S60, Series 80), N-Gage Classic/QD
- First release: Bounce; 2001
- Latest release: Bounce Boing Battle; 2010

Bounce is a platformer mobile game series published by Nokia, revolving around the player controlling a red ball and navigating through levels. After the original Bounce, which was a 2D platformer, Nokia made a follow up named Bounce Back, and later teamed up with Rovio Entertainment who developed numerous new titles until 2010, including games set in 3D worlds. Kuju also developed alongside Nokia a prototype Bounce game for N-Gage that was not released.

== Titles ==
=== Bounce (2001) ===
In Bounce, the player controls a red ball using the four arrow keys on the Nokia mobile phone through many levels in a 2D side-scrolling game world. The game had a total of 11 levels. 2 level packs (12–16, 17–21) were available to download for Series 60 and Series 80 (Symbian OS) Nokia handsets.

It came pre-loaded on many Nokia mobile phones starting with the Nokia 9210 Communicator (Series 80) from 2000 (released 2001) and through updated versions it was also pre-loaded on entry-level Series 40 handsets such as Nokia 6610 (2002) and Nokia 3220 (2004).

==== Gameplay ====
To pass each level the red ball must go through all hoops in that level thus opening the grey door to the next level, having three lives initially as indicated by the three red balls at the bottom of the screen above the remaining number of hoops required to go through in that level (one removed each time one is passed through) and the 8-digit score on the right. Enemies come in the form of static yellow coloured spikes (called "candles") as well as spiky blue moving objects (commonly referred to as "spiders" by the game fanbase) which move along a designated path either left-right, top-bottom or diagonally at various speeds. Touching an enemy will burst the red ball and a life will be lost, these can be regained or increased by collecting light blue balls with the same colour as the background up to a maximum of five. Game progress is temporarily stored via the various yellow rhombus checkpoints in each level which allows the ball to respawn at the location of the last collected rhombus (turning into a red downwards arrow once collected and disappearing after the next one is collected) once it loses a life, until all lives are lost which ends the game.

Starting from level 3 onwards, water areas are introduced into the game where the original (and smaller) red ball will rapidly sink to the bottom once entering. Hitting the enlarge spike (green with an inverted yellow dome on top) will make the ball bigger (which is now coloured blue) thus allowing it to float above water, while a large ball underwater will immediately stick to the uppermost blocks and rise upwards rapidly until it floats above water. To recover the large ball back into the original red ball, the shrink spikes (row of four thin red each with an inverted red dome on top) can be used. Some taller height differences require the large ball to be reached while some narrow passageways can only be accessed by the original red ball.

Speed blocks (blue instead of red) are also first introduced in level 3 where bouncing the ball repeatedly on these blocks will increase the bounce height of the ball per bounce until the ball hits the uppermost blocks thus reaching its maximum bounce speed (this will reset once the continuous bouncing action is broken once), which can be used in combination with slanting blocks to reach further heights. Hitting the speed box (yellow with a + symbol and a red dot in the middle) will temporarily increase the moving speed of the ball rapidly with a timer at the bottom of the screen, while hitting the anti-gravity spike (thick blue/grey with yellow panels on top) will cause the ball to fly and temporarily attach to the uppermost blocks also with a timer at the bottom of the screen.

In level 11, there is one particular area which can cause the original red ball to be permanently trapped: a checkpoint completely surrounded by four rows of shrink spikes in one of the lower right areas under but without water. To collect it the regular red ball should be positioned between the uppermost blocks and the top row of shrink spikes, then the ball should move to the right and drop down (try a few times for it to work). However, if the red ball then gets hit and bursts before another checkpoint is collected it will respawn at the checkpoint within the four rows of shrink spikes, with no way out the only solution is to start a new game.

==== Cheats ====
Two cheat codes are available for this game. Pressing "787898" will give the ball infinite health, while pressing "787899" will unlock advanced cheats: press 1 to level down, 3 to level up, 5 to level up with full score and # to fly the ball (same effects as anti-gravity spike with a timer at the bottom of the screen). Infinite health is especially useful in a lower-right area of level 7 where one hoop with a checkpoint underneath is located behind a series of four "spiders" moving top-bottom which are harder to get past, as it is equally harder to get back outside afterwards without losing a life, if the player collects the checkpoint inside they will always respawn there once a life is lost and still not have gotten back outside. On the other hand, flying under the advanced cheats is especially useful in level 11 where the vast game area is usually accessed by floating the large ball upwards inside the various water areas or sinking the regular red ball downwards inside the water areas.

==== Version differences ====
Different handsets also had different versions of the game, such as the 9210 and 7650 which had levels 3 and 4 swapped, with moving platforms, among other general differences. The original version of the game on the 9210/7650 had noticeably higher resolution sprites with a wider display of the level (640×200 pixels) compared to the more-well-known version (128x128 pixels). The Nokia 1280 had a B&W version of the game in which the speed blocks were depicted with denser shades of black to show their differences from the regular blocks without the use of two different colours.

=== Bounce Back (2004) ===
Released as a downloadable Java game, it has a total of 20 levels.

=== Bounce Boing Voyage (2008) ===
First 3D Bounce title and first to be developed by Rovio, it was released on the N-Gage 2.0 platform. There are many bonus spheres in the world for the player to find and capture, adding to their total number of points. An extra three levels were available to get from the N-Gage Arena.

=== Bounce Touch (2008) ===
Developed by Rovio, this version of Bounce Boing Voyage makes use of the touchscreen of the Nokia 5800 XpressMusic smartphone on which it came embedded on. The world of Pongpingy here is in 3D, and the antagonist is Hypnotoid.

=== Bounce Tales (2008) ===
Classic 2D side-scrolling Bounce title developed by Rovio, in Java format. The antagonist in this game is a cube-shaped creature named Hypnotoid. In Bounce Tales, Bounce the character acquires abilities to change his shape/texture to a beach ball, a rock and his original form, the red ball, each with differing abilities.

Bounce Tales came preloaded on Nokia 7210 Supernova, 7510 Supernova, 6700 classic, 6303 classic, 5130 XpressMusic, 6710 Navigator, 3720 classic, 6600i slide, 2720 Fold, and Nokia X3-00.

=== Bounce Evolution (2009) ===
A 3D game designed for the Nokia N900 running Maemo, it was released for download on the Ovi Store on 11 January 2010 on the same day as it launched for N900/Maemo. The game was initially developed by Rovio in collaboration with Nokia in a project to test the hardware performance of the N900.

=== Bounce Boing Battle (2010) ===
Developed by Rovio for Symbian^1 devices as a sort of spin-off title, this is Bounce in a two player battle format. Players compete in tennis-style matches to bounce a ball back and forth using walls drawn within the game arena.

== Level editor ==
An unofficial level creator called BouncEdit was created in 2003 which allowed a personalized level to be made. Also there have also been many mods of some of the Bounce games, mainly Bounce Tales.

== Reception ==
Some considered the Bounce character to be like Nokia's mascot character.

All About N-Gage reviewed Bounce Boing Voyage in 2008 and gave it a score of 84%, comparing it to Super Mario 64 and giving praise to its "charm", gameplay, graphics, soundtrack and accessibility. However the reviewer noted that it might be too easy for some. Pocket Gamer's Spanner Spencer rated it 4 out of 5 calling it a "well designed sequel" and that it is "exactly the kind of console-esque pocket game the N-Gage needs". Ewan Spence of All About Symbian reviewed the later Bounce Boing Battle and scored it 71%, giving praise to its Bluetooth multiplayer capability but calling it "unfinished".

The game Bounce Evolution was seen as a technology demonstrator of OpenGL ES 2.0's capabilities, in the Nokia N900. It was considered to have very advanced 3D graphics for a mobile game of the time.

== Clones ==
Many unofficial "remakes" of Bounce have been created and are available on the Google Play Store or App Store. However, none of these remakes feature levels 12–21, nor are there any remakes of the Bounce sequels. In addition, using the two original cheat codes in these unofficial "remakes" are no longer possible unless the actual game includes this as a built-in feature.

One of the most iconic "remakes" of Bounce is the Red Ball series created by Russian game developer Evgeniy "Eugene" Fedoseev and hosted by King.com and Not Doppler. The four-part series of Adobe Flash games was developed with Box2D physics engine. The franchise also spawned multiple clones, mods, and is well known among the speedrunning community. Fedoseev also developed a two-part spinoff series entitled Red and Blue Balls, wherein the player must navigate two different colored balls to their designated goals.

A similar series is the Bounce On franchise for iOS and Android devices, developed by American game developer Phobic Studios and currently maintained by Iddy Biddy Games. They were also developed in Box2D physics engine. The game has three sequels, Bounce On in 2008, Bounce On 2: Drallo's Demise in 2010, a Doodle Jump clone spinoff Bounce On Up released on the same year, and Bounce On Back in 2014. All of the games were removed on Apple App Store and Google Play Store on 2017. The first two games were re-released in 2026 on Steam for PC devices.

Two fan projects are currently in active development, targeting modern platforms while maintaining the aesthetic of the original J2ME and Symbian releases:

- Bounce Stories: Developed by "Bounce Team," this project is a comprehensive recreation and expansion of Bounce Tales (2008). Since July 2021, the developers have given updates via a YouTube channel to document the game's evolution through multiple iterations, showcasing a shift toward a more polished, high-definition art style. Bounce Stories is slated to include the original content alongside new playable characters, over 12 additional chapters and various bonus levels. While a Windows release seems to be the primary focus, there is potential for future expansion into the mobile platform. A definitive release date has not been announced.
- BouncEngine: An emerging recreation of the original game developed by an individual known as "root". The project gained initial visibility in February 2026 via a trailer video on YouTube showcasing gameplay mechanics seemingly indistinguishable from the original. Notably, the engine includes over 50 "ancient" levels originally sourced from Chris Moyles' website. The presence of an "Online" button in the preview video hints at features like user-generated level sharing or even live multiplayer functionality. The developer has provided very little additional information and is yet to reveal a definitive release date or confirmed plans for a mobile expansion.

== See also ==
- Snake
- Space Impact
- N-Gage
- Angry Birds
