= Nokia X2 =

Nokia X2 is a brand name used for several phones made by Nokia:

- Nokia X2-00 feature phone, 2010
- Nokia X2-01 feature phone with a QWERTY keyboard, 2011
- Nokia X2-02 feature phone, 2012
- Nokia X2-05 feature phone, 2011
- Nokia X2 (2014), Android smartphone successor to the Nokia X, 2014
