= Sony Ericsson W395 =

Mobile phone model

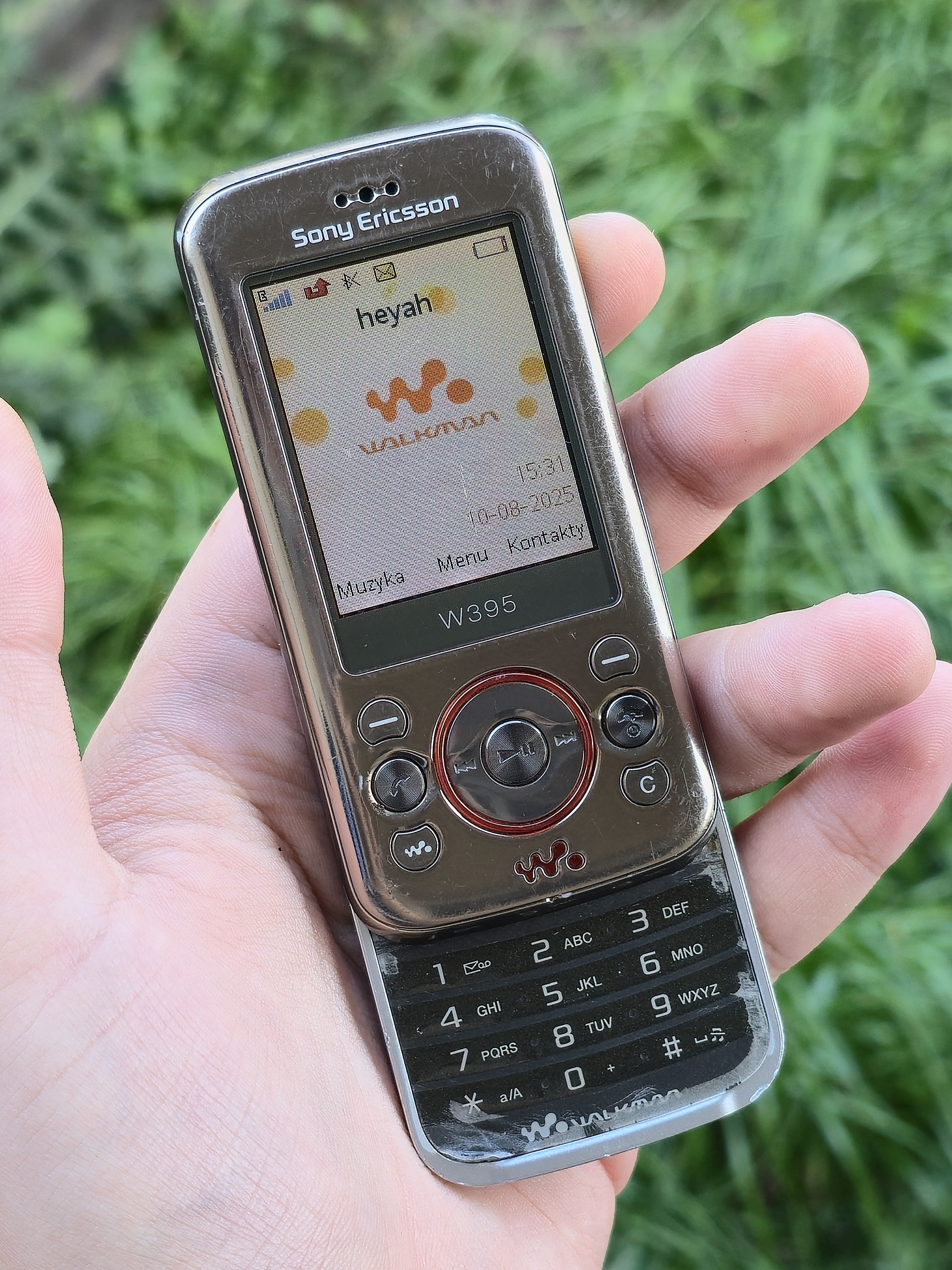
- First released: February 2009; 17 years ago
- Availability by region: March 2009
- Compatible networks: GSM 850, GSM 900, GSM 1800, GSM 1900
- Dimensions: 96.0×47.0×14.9 mm (3.78×1.85×0.59 in)
- Weight: 96.0 g (3 oz)
- Memory: 10 MB integrated, Memory Stick Micro (M2) 512 MB in box, SanDisk microSD transflash supported
- Display: 176x220 pixels
- Connectivity: 3.5Mbit/s HSDPA, W-CDMA, EDGE, GPRS, HSCSD, CSD, Bluetooth 2.0, USB (with Mass Storage Mode, PictBridge Mode support)

The Sony Ericsson W395 is a slider mobile phone and part of the Walkman series of Sony Ericsson mobiles. It was announced in February 2009 and was later officially released in March that year. The W395 is targeted at the youth market, as well as being a Walkman phone it also has TrackID music recognition. It is a "low end" phone running Sagem and Sony Ericsson's proprietary platform, A050, which has bigger letters and different animations compared to A100. The only other phones which runs A050 are the Sony Ericsson W302, Sony Ericsson F305 and Sony Ericsson S312.

The W395 has 480 hours in standby time on the battery and 8 hours talk time. You can also listen to music for 12 hours and 30 minutes.

It comes in Fiesta Black, Flush Titanium, Dusky Gray, Happy Pink, and Hello Kitty Pink.

The Nokia X3-00, another music-oriented phone, was considered by reviewers to be a competitor of the Sony Ericsson W395.
