= Nokia Xseries =

Family of mobile phones

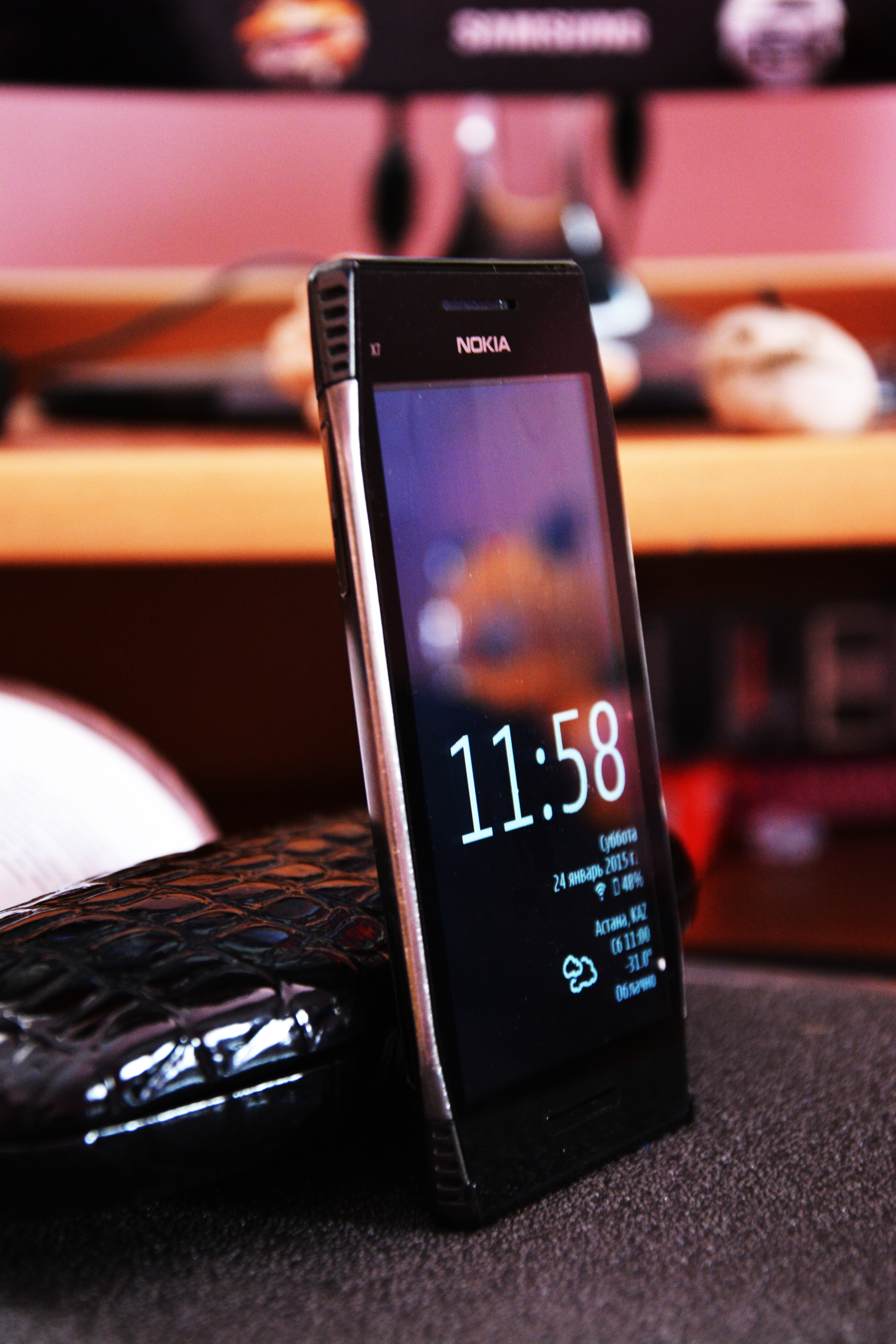
Image of Nokia X7

The Nokia Xseries is a line of mobile phones from Nokia introduced in September 2009 as the successor of the XpressMusic series. It was targeted towards a young audience, and are more focused on music and entertainment with special dedicated keys, inbuilt storage and other facilities. The X2-02, released in January 2012, was the last handset of the series.

In May 2018, HMD Global launched the new Nokia X6 for the Chinese market but it is not officially classified as new member of Xseries. In April 2021, the Xseries reintroduced as the highest tier smartphone series of the brand with the launch of Nokia X10 and Nokia X20.

== List of devices ==
=== Series 30 mobile phones ===
- Nokia X1-00
- Nokia X1-01

=== Series 40 mobile phones ===
- Nokia X2-00
- Nokia X2-01
- Nokia X2-02
- Nokia X2-05
- Nokia X3-00
- Nokia X3 Touch and Type (or Nokia X3-02)

=== Symbian smartphones ===
- Nokia X5-00
- Nokia X5-01
- Nokia X6-00
- Nokia X7-00

=== Android smartphones ===
- Nokia X10
- Nokia X20
- Nokia XR20
- Nokia X30

== See also ==
- Nokia phone series
