= X2 =

X2 may refer to:

== Computers ==
- X2 (protocol), a pre-V.90 standard for 56k downstream modem communications
- Athlon 64 X2, the first dual-core desktop CPU manufactured by AMD
- A two-lane PCI Express, slot
- A type of optical transceiver for 10 Gigabit Ethernet
- X2, a transport interface used to connect enodeBs in a LTE/4G network

== Vehicles and transportation ==
=== Aircraft, spacecraft and rockets ===
- Bell X-2, an experimental supersonic aircraft
- Mitsubishi X-2 Shinshin, a Japanese experimental stealth fighter (formerly known as ATD-X)
- Orba, also known as X-2, a planned British satellite
- Sikorsky X2, a prototype, coaxial high-speed helicopter
- Skycycle X-2, a rocket used by Evel Knievel
- Skydio X2, an quadcopter camera drone
- SpaceShipOne flight 17P, also known as X2, the second Ansari X Prize flight
- X-2 Dragonfly, the company designation of the Rotor-Craft XR-11 experimental helicopter of the late 1940s
- X-2 Rocket, the spacecraft used in Mission: Space in Epcot Center, Orlando, Florida

=== Watercraft ===
- Bathyscaphe Trieste II, also known as X-2, the US Navy bathyscaphe based on the Trieste
- HMS X2, a Royal Navy submarine
- Kawasaki X2, a personal water craft

=== Other vehicles and transportation ===
- BMW X2, a SUV vehicle produced by BMW
- North Wing Sport X2, an American ultralight trike design
- SJ X2, used for the X 2000 train system in Sweden
- X2 (New York City bus), a bus route
- Benning Road–H Street Line, a Metrobus route in Washington, D.C., designated X2

== Video games ==
- Dance Dance Revolution X2, a 2010 music video game for the PlayStation 2
- Final Fantasy X-2, a 2003 role-playing video game
- Mega Man X2, a 1994 platform game
- X2: The Threat, a 2003 space simulation game
- X2: Wolverine's Revenge, a 2003 action video game
- X2 (video game), a 1997 video game
- X2, the main character in Star Wars Battlefront: Elite Squadron

== Film ==
- X2 (film), a 2003 sequel to the 2000 film X-Men
- XXX: State of the Union, also known as X2 or xXx²: The Next Level, a 2005 American film

== Music ==
- X2 (soundtrack), 2003
- X2 (album), a 2003 album by Tes
- X2, a 2022 album by Sick Luke

== Phones ==
- Nokia X2, feature phone/smartphone
- Sendo X2, a Series 60 mobile phone
- Sony Ericsson Xperia X2, smartphone

== Other ==
- X2 (roller coaster), at Six Flags Magic Mountain
- Chi-squared distribution, a theoretical probability distribution in inferential statistics
- Square (algebra), also known as the algebraic square
- Keyboard sold by Korg in the 1990s
- X-2 Counter Espionage Branch, counterintelligence branch of the Office of Strategic Services

== See also ==
- 2X (disambiguation)
