= XO-2 (disambiguation) =

XO-2 is a star.

XO-2 may also refer to:

- XO-2Nb, an extrasolar planet orbiting XO-2.
- OLPC XO-2, a design study of the One Laptop per Child computer
- Douglas XO-2, a variant of the Douglas O-2 U.S. Army Air Corps interwar observation plane

== See also ==
- X02 (September 2002), a Microsoft Xbox expo
- \x02 control code
- X2 (disambiguation)
