= DXT =

DXT may refer to:

- Grand Mixer DXT, the credited inventor of turntablism
- DXT, a family of implementations of the S3 Texture Compression algorithm
