= ATI2 =

ATI2 may refer to:

- 3Dc FourCC code, a lossy data compression algorithm
- RFB ATI-2, the second prototype of the German RFB Fantrainer aircraft
