= Nokia X1-00 =

Low cost phone, from Nokia

- Manufacturer: Nokia
- Type: Basic phone
- Series: Nokia Xseries
- First released: March 2011
- Availability by region: May 2011
- Form factor: Bar
- Colors: Orange, Blue, Dark Grey
- Dimensions: 112.2 mm × 47.3 mm × 16 mm (4.42 in × 1.86 in × 0.63 in)
- Weight: 91.1 g (3.21 oz)
- Operating system: Nokia Series 30
- Removable storage: microSD, up to 16 GB
- Battery: 1320 mAh Li-ion, removable (Nokia BL-5J)
- Display: 1.8 in (4.6 cm) 128 x 160 px (~114 ppi pixel density) TFT with 65K colors
- Connectivity: 3.5 mm headphone jack; FM radio, Stereo
- Data inputs: Numeric Keypad
- Development status: Discontinued
- Other: Built-in flashlight, MP3 player

The Nokia X1-00 is a discontinued ultra-basic phone manufactured by Nokia for users in developing countries. The phone was announced in March 2011 and released in the second quarter of 2011. According to Nokia, the phone is expected to have a standby time of 61 days.

== Specifications ==
It has an FM radio and flashlight, but lacks a camera, Bluetooth, GPS, GPRS, or any other type of cellular data.
