= 2X =

2X or 2-X may refer to:

- A typographic approximation of 2×, or multiplication by 2
  - "two power"/"two times" magnification
- A typographical or transcription error of 2^{x}, or Power of two
- A shortcut for the term twice
- Saab 9-2X
- LG Optimus 2X
- Double scull in rowing
- J-2X, a model of J-2 (rocket engine)
- Nord Lead 2X; see Nord Lead
- 2X Software, now owned by Parallels (company)
- 2X, a 2016 album by Lil Durk

== See also ==
- 2 X Again, a 2007 album by Michael Angelo Batio
- X2 (disambiguation)
