= DirectDraw Surface =

Graphic file format

- Filename extension: .dds
- Internet media type: image/vnd.ms-dds, image/x-dds, image/x-direct-draw-surface
- Uniform Type Identifier (UTI): com.microsoft.dds
- Magic number: 'D' 'D' 'S' ' '
- Developed by: Microsoft
- Initial release: 1999; 27 years ago
- Type of format: Image file formats
- Website: docs.microsoft.com/en-us/windows/win32/direct3ddds/dx-graphics-dds

The DirectDraw Surface container file format is a Microsoft format for storing data compressed with the previously proprietary S3 Texture Compression (S3TC) algorithm, which can be decompressed in hardware by GPUs. This makes the format useful for storing graphical textures and cubic environment maps as a data file, both compressed and uncompressed. The file extension for this data format is '.dds'.

== History ==
This format was introduced with DirectX 7.0. In DirectX 8.0, support for volume textures was added. With Direct3D 10, the file format was extended to allow an array of textures to be included, as well as support for new Direct3D 10.x and 11 texture formats such as BC6H and BC7.

Initial DDS support landed in GIMP 2.10.10 released on April 4, 2019.

== See also ==
- DirectX
- Direct3D
- DirectDraw
- S3 Texture Compression
