= OpenGL ES =

Subset of the OpenGL API for embedded systems

- Developer: Khronos Group
- Release: July 28, 2003; 23 years ago
- Successor: Vulkan
- Type: 3D graphics API
- License: Open source license for use of the Sample Implementation (SI): This is a Free Software License B closely modeled on BSD, X, and Mozilla licenses.; Trademark license for new licensees who want to use the OpenGL trademark and logo and claim conformance.
- Website: khronos.org/opengles

OpenGL for Embedded Systems (OpenGL ES or GLES) is a subset of the OpenGL computer graphics rendering application programming interface (API) for rendering 2D and 3D computer graphics such as those used by video games, typically hardware-accelerated using a graphics processing unit (GPU). It is designed for embedded systems like smartphones, tablet computers, video game consoles and PDAs. OpenGL ES is the "most widely deployed 3D graphics API in history".

The API is cross-language and multi-platform. OpenGL ES is managed by the non-profit technology consortium Khronos Group. Vulkan, a next-generation API from Khronos, is made for simpler high performance drivers for mobile and desktop devices.

== Versions ==
Several versions of the OpenGL ES specification now exist. OpenGL ES 1.0 is drawn up against the OpenGL 1.3 specification, OpenGL ES 1.1 is defined relative to the OpenGL 1.5 specification and OpenGL ES 2.0 is defined relative to the OpenGL 2.0 specification. This means that, for example, an application written for OpenGL ES 1.0 should be easily portable to the desktop OpenGL 1.3; as the OpenGL ES is a stripped-down version of the API, the reverse may or may not be true, depending on the particular features used.

OpenGL ES comes with its own version of shading language (OpenGL ES SL), which is different from OpenGL SL.

Version 1.0 and 1.1 both have common (CM) and common lite (CL) profiles, the difference being that the common lite profile only supports fixed-point instead of floating point data type support, whereas common supports both.

=== OpenGL ES 1.0 ===
OpenGL ES 1.0 was released publicly July 28, 2003. OpenGL ES 1.0 is based on the original OpenGL 1.3 API, with much functionality removed and a little bit added. One significant difference between OpenGL and OpenGL ES is that OpenGL ES removed the need to bracket OpenGL library calls with glBegin and glEnd. Other significant differences are that the calling semantics for primitive rendering functions were changed in favor of vertex arrays, and fixed-point data types were introduced for vertex coordinates. Attributes were also added to better support the computational abilities of embedded processors, which often lack a floating point unit (FPU). Many other functions and rendering primitives were removed in version 1.0 to produce a lightweight interface, including:

- quad and polygon rendering primitives;
- texgen, line, and polygon stipple;
- polygon mode and antialiased polygon rendering are not supported, although rendering using multisample is still possible (rather than alpha border fragments);
- ARB_Image pixel class operations, bitmaps, and 3D textures are not supported;
- several of the more technical drawing modes are eliminated, including frontbuffer and accumulation buffer;
- bitmap operations for copying pixels individually, evaluators, and user selection operations are not allowed;
- display lists and feedback are removed, as are push and pop operations for state attributes;
- and some material parameters were removed, including back-face parameters and user-defined clip planes.

The actual version is 1.0.0.2.

Extension Name	Sort #Number	Details
OES_byte_coordinates	OpenGL ES Extension #4	(formerly OpenGL Extension #291)
OES_compressed_paletted_texture	OpenGL ES Extension #6	(formerly OpenGL Extension #294)
OES_fixed_point	OpenGL ES Extension #9	(formerly OpenGL Extension #292)
OES_query_matrix	OpenGL ES Extension #16	(formerly OpenGL Extension #296)
OES_read_format	OpenGL ES Extension #17	(formerly OpenGL Extension #295)
OES_single_precision	OpenGL ES Extension #18	(formerly OpenGL Extension #293)
	optional	Mesa (most drivers)
OES_compressed_ETC1_RGB8_texture	OpenGL ES Extension #5	

=== OpenGL ES 1.1 ===
OpenGL ES 1.1 added features such as mandatory support for multitexture, better multitexture support (including combiners and dot product texture operations), automatic mipmap generation, vertex buffer objects, state queries, user clip planes, and greater control over point rendering. Actual Version is 1.1.12.

Extension Name	Sort #Number
OES_draw_texture	OpenGL ES Extension #7
OES_matrix_get	OpenGL ES Extension #11
OES_point_size_array	OpenGL ES Extension #14
OES_point_sprite	OpenGL ES Extension #15
optional	Mesa (all drivers)
OES_framebuffer_object	OpenGL ES Extension #10 (became core in ES 2.0)
OES_EGL_image	OpenGL ES Extension #23
OES_EGL_image_external	OpenGL ES Extension #87
OES_required_internalformat	OpenGL ES Extension # TBD

=== OpenGL ES 2.0 ===
OpenGL ES 2.0 was publicly released in March 2007. It is roughly based on OpenGL 2.0, but it eliminates most of the fixed-function rendering pipeline in favor of a programmable one in a move similar to the transition from OpenGL 3.0 to 3.1. Control flow in shaders is generally limited to forward branching and to loops where the maximum number of iterations can easily be determined at compile time. Almost all rendering features of the transform and lighting stage, such as the specification of materials and light parameters formerly specified by the fixed-function API, are replaced by shaders written by the graphics programmer. As a result, OpenGL ES 2.0 is not backward compatible with OpenGL ES 1.1. Some incompatibilities between the desktop version of OpenGL and OpenGL ES 2.0 persisted until OpenGL 4.1, which added the GL_ARB_ES2_compatibility extension. Actual version is 2.0.25.

The Khronos Group has written a document describing the differences between OpenGL ES 2.0 and ordinary OpenGL 2.0.

Extension Name	Sort #Number
OES_texture_cube_map	OpenGL ES Extension #20
OES_texture_npot	OpenGL ES Extension #37
OES_depth24	OpenGL ES Extension #24
OES_depth_texture	OpenGL ES Extension #44
OES_element_index_uint	OpenGL ES Extension #26
OES_fbo_render_mipmap	OpenGL ES Extension #27
OES_get_program_binary	OpenGL ES Extension #47
OES_mapbuffer	OpenGL ES Extension #29
OES_packed_depth_stencil	OpenGL ES Extension #43
OES_rgb8_rgba8	OpenGL ES Extension #30
OES_stencil8	OpenGL ES Extension #33
OES_vertex_half_float	OpenGL ES Extension #38
additional	in MESA (all drivers)
OES_EGL_image	OpenGL ES Extension #23 (different for 1.1)
OES_EGL_image_external	OpenGL ES Extension #87 (different for 1.1)
OES_texture_3D	OpenGL ES Extension #34 (became core in ES 3.0)
OES_texture_float_linear OES_texture_half_float_linear	OpenGL ES Extension #35, extended in ES 3.0 and 3.1
OES_texture_float OES_texture_half_float	OpenGL ES Extension #36, extended in ES 3.0 and 3.1
OES_standard_derivatives	OpenGL ES Extension #45
OES_vertex_array_object	OpenGL ES Extension #71 (became core in ES 3.0)
OES_surfaceless_context	OpenGL ES Extension #116
OES_depth_texture_cube_map	OpenGL ES Extension #136
EXT_texture_filter_anisotropic	OpenGL ES Extension #41
EXT_texture_type_2_10_10_10_REV	OpenGL ES Extension #42
EXT_texture_compression_dxt1	OpenGL ES Extension #49
EXT_texture_format_BGRA8888	OpenGL ES Extension #51
EXT_discard_framebuffer	OpenGL ES Extension #64
EXT_blend_minmax	OpenGL ES Extension #65
EXT_read_format_bgra	OpenGL ES Extension #66
EXT_multi_draw_arrays	OpenGL ES Extension #69
EXT_frag_depth	OpenGL ES Extension #86
EXT_unpack_subimage	OpenGL ES Extension #90
EXT_texture_rg	OpenGL ES Extension #103
EXT_draw_buffers	OpenGL ES Extension #151
EXT_compressed_ETC1_RGB8_sub_texture	OpenGL ES Extension #188
NV_draw_buffers	OpenGL ES Extension #91
NV_fbo_color_attachments	OpenGL ES Extension #92
NV_read_buffer	OpenGL ES Extension #93
NV_read_depth_stencil	OpenGL ES Extension #94
ANGLE_texture_compression_dxt	OpenGL ES Extension #111

=== OpenGL ES 3.0 ===
The OpenGL ES 3.0 specification was publicly released in August 2012. It is backwards compatible with OpenGL ES 2.0, and partially compatible with WebGL 2.0, as WebGL 2.0 was designed to have a high degree of interoperability with OpenGL ES 3.0. The current version of the OpenGL ES 3.0 standard is 3.0.6, released in November 2019.

New functionality in the OpenGL ES 3.0 specification includes:

- multiple enhancements to the rendering pipeline to enable acceleration of advanced visual effects including: occlusion queries, transform feedback, instanced rendering and support for four or more rendering targets;
- high quality ETC2 / EAC texture compression as a standard feature, eliminating the need for a different set of textures for each platform;
- a new version of the GLSL ES shading language with full support for integer and 32-bit floating point operations;
- greatly enhanced texturing functionality including guaranteed support for floating point textures, 3D textures, depth textures, vertex textures, NPOT textures, R/RG textures, immutable textures, 2D array textures, swizzles, LOD and mip level clamps, seamless cube maps and sampler objects;
- an extensive set of required, explicitly sized texture and render-buffer formats, reducing implementation variability and making it much easier to write portable applications.

Extension Name	Sort #Number	Details
KHR_context_flush_control	OpenGL ES Extension #191	(for GL_KHR_context_flush_control only)
additional	in MESA (all drivers)	
OES_texture_compression_astc	OpenGL ES Extension #162	
EXT_texture_border_clamp	OpenGL ES Extension #182	
EXT_draw_elements_base_vertex	OpenGL ES Extension #204	
OES_EGL_image_external_essl3	OpenGL ES Extension #220	
MESA_shader_integer_functions	OpenGL ES Extension #495	

=== OpenGL ES 3.1 ===
The OpenGL ES 3.1 specification was publicly released in March 2014. New functionality in OpenGL ES 3.1 includes:

- Compute shaders
- Independent vertex and fragment shaders
- Indirect draw commands

OpenGL ES 3.1 is backward compatible with OpenGL ES 2.0 and 3.0, thus enabling applications to incrementally incorporate new features. Actual Version is 3.1-(November 2016).

Extension Name	Sort #Number
ARB_arrays_of_arrays	ARB Extension #120
ARB_compute_shader	ARB Extension #122
ARB_explicit_uniform_location	ARB Extension #128
ARB_framebuffer_no_attachments	ARB Extension #130
ARB_program_interface_query	ARB Extension #134
ARB_shader_atomic_counters	ARB Extension #114
ARB_shader_image_load_store	ARB Extension #115
ARB_shader_storage_buffer_object	ARB Extension #137
ARB_separate_shader_objects	ARB Extension #97
ARB_stencil_texturing	ARB Extension #138
ARB_vertex_attrib_binding	ARB Extension #125
ARB_draw_indirect	ARB Extension #87
ARB_shading_language_packing	ARB Extension #116
ARB_shader_image_size	ARB Extension #136
ARB_texture_storage_multisample	ARB Extension #141
ARB_texture_multisample	ARB Extension #67
EXT_shader_integer_mix	OpenGL ES Extension #161
optional	Mesa (all drivers OpenGL ES 3.1+)
ARB_sample_locations	ARB Extension #181
OES_texture_view	OpenGL ES Extension #218
NV_image_formats	OpenGL ES Extension #200
EXT_render_snorm	OpenGL ES Extension #206
EXT_texture_norm16	OpenGL ES Extension #207

=== OpenGL ES 3.2 ===
The OpenGL ES 3.2 specification was publicly released in August 2015. New capabilities in OpenGL ES 3.2 include:

- Geometry and tessellation shaders to efficiently process complex scenes on the GPU.
- Floating point render targets for increased flexibility in higher precision compute operations.
- ASTC compression to reduce the memory footprint and bandwidth used to process textures.
- Enhanced blending for sophisticated compositing and handling of multiple color attachments.
- Advanced texture targets such as texture buffers, multisample 2D array and cube map arrays.
- Debug and robustness features for easier code development and secure execution.

Actual State is 3.2.6 July 2019.

Extension Name	Sort #Number
KHR_blend_equation_advanced	OpenGL ES Extension #168
EXT_color_buffer_float	OpenGL ES Extension #137
KHR_debug	OpenGL ES Extension #118
KHR_robustness	OpenGL ES Extension #190
OES_copy_image	OpenGL ES Extension #208
OES_draw_buffers_indexed	OpenGL ES Extension #209
OES_draw_elements_base_vertex	OpenGL ES Extension #219
OES_geometry_shader	OpenGL ES Extension #210
OES_gpu_shader5	OpenGL ES Extension #211
OES_sample_shading	OpenGL ES Extension #169
OES_sample_variables	OpenGL ES Extension #170
OES_shader_image_atomic	OpenGL ES Extension #171
OES_shader_io_blocks	OpenGL ES Extension #213
OES_shader_multisample_interpolation	OpenGL ES Extension #172
OES_tessellation_shader	OpenGL ES Extension #214
OES_texture_border_clamp	OpenGL ES Extension #215
OES_texture_buffer	OpenGL ES Extension #216
OES_texture_cube_map_array	OpenGL ES Extension #217
OES_texture_stencil8	OpenGL ES Extension #173
OES_texture_storage_multisample_2d_array	OpenGL ES Extension #174
KHR_texture_compression_astc_ldr	OpenGL ES Extension #117 (LDR only)
OES_primitive_bounding_box	OpenGL ES Extension #212
optional	Mesa (all drivers OpenGL ES 3.2+)
KHR_texture_compression_astc_hdr	OpenGL ES Extension #117 (LDR included), ARB Extension #118
KHR_blend_equation_advanced_coherent	OpenGL ES Extension #168
KHR_texture_compression_astc_sliced_3d	OpenGL ES Extension #249 (ARB Extension #189)
OES_viewport_array	OpenGL ES Extension #267

Some more extensions are developed or in Development in Mesa for next OpenGL ES Version (see Mesamatrix).

Next generation API is Vulkan.

== Platform usage ==
For complete list of companies and their conformant products, view here

=== OpenGL ES 1.0 ===
OpenGL ES 1.0 added an official 3D graphics API to the Android and Symbian OS v8.0a operating systems, as well as by QNX It is also supported by the PlayStation 3 as one of its official graphics APIs (the other one being low level libgcm library) with Nvidia's Cg in lieu of GLSL. The PlayStation 3 also includes several features of the 2.0 version of OpenGL ES.

- Nokia 6630

=== OpenGL ES 1.1 ===
The 1.1 version of OpenGL ES is supported by:

- Android 1.6
- Apple iOS for iPad, iPhone, and iPod Touch
- RIM's BlackBerry 5.0 operating system series (only BlackBerry Storm 2, BlackBerry Curve 8530 and later models have the needed hardware)
- BlackBerry PlayBook
- BlackBerry BB10
- Various Nokia phones such as Nokia N95, N93, N93i, and N82.
- The Palm webOS, using the Plug-in Development Kit
- Nintendo 3DS

=== OpenGL ES 2.0 ===
Supported by:

- The Android platform since Android 2.0 through NDK and Android 2.2 through Java
- AmigaOS on AmigaOne with Warp3D Nova and compatible Radeon HD graphics card.
- Apple iOS 5 or later in iPad, iPad Mini, iPhone 3GS or later, and iPod Touch 3rd generation or later
- BlackBerry devices with BlackBerry OS 7.0 and Blackberry 10, as well as the BlackBerry PlayBook
- Google Native Client
- Intel HD Graphics 965G / X3000 and higher (Linux)
- Nvidia (Android), Curie NV40+: Linux, Windows
- Various Nokia phones (such as Symbian^3 based Nokia N8, MeeGo based Nokia N9, and Maemo based Nokia N900)
- Palm webOS, using the Plug-in Development Kit
- The Pandora console
- The Raspberry Pi
- The Odroid
- Various Samsung mobile phones (such as the Wave)
- Web browsers (WebGL)
- The GCW Zero console
- The PlayStation Vita portable console
- The PlayStation 4 console

=== OpenGL ES 3.0 ===
Supported by:

- Android since version 4.3, on devices with appropriate hardware and drivers, including:
  - Nexus 7 (2013)
  - Nexus 4
  - Nexus 5
  - Nexus 10
  - HTC Butterfly S
  - HTC One/One Max
  - LG G2
  - LG G Pad 8.3
  - Samsung Galaxy J5
  - Samsung Galaxy J5 (2016)
  - Samsung Galaxy S4 (Snapdragon version)
  - Samsung Galaxy S5
  - Samsung Galaxy Note 3
  - Samsung Galaxy Note 10.1 (2014 Edition)
  - Sony Xperia M
  - Sony Xperia Z/ZL
  - Sony Xperia Z1
  - Sony Xperia Z Ultra
  - Sony Xperia Tablet Z
- iOS since version 7, on devices including:
  - iPhone 5S
  - iPad Air
  - iPad mini with Retina display
- BlackBerry 10 OS since version 10.2, on devices including:
  - BlackBerry Z3
  - BlackBerry Z30
  - BlackBerry Passport

Supported by some recent versions of these GPUs:

- Adreno 300 and 400 series (Android, BlackBerry 10, Windows10 Windows RT)
- Mali T600 series onwards (Android, Linux, Windows 7)
- PowerVR Series6 (iOS, Linux)
- Vivante (Android, OS X 10.8.3, Windows 7)
- Nvidia (Android), Tesla G80+: Linux, Windows 7+
- Intel HD Graphics Sandy Bridge and higher (Linux)
- AMD Terascale and actual GCN-architecture (Windows, Linux)
- LLVMpipe and Softpipe: soft drivers in Mesa
- VIRGL: virtual Driver for virtual machines in 2018 with Mesa 18.1 (See Mesamatrix.net)

=== OpenGL ES 3.1 ===
Supported by Windows, Linux, Android (since version 5.0) on devices with appropriate hardware and drivers, including:

- Adreno 400 series
- Adreno 500 series (Mesa 18.1 for Linux and Android)
- AMD Terascale and actual GCN-architecture (Windows, Linux (r600, radeonSI))
- Intel HD Graphics for Intel Atom Z3700 series (Android)
- Intel HD Graphics for Intel Celeron N and J series (Android)
- Intel HD Graphics for Intel Pentium N and J series (Android)
- Intel HD Graphics Haswell and higher (Linux Mesa: previous Ivy Bridge nearly without stencil texturing)
- Mali T6xx (midgard) series onwards (Android, Linux)
- Nvidia GeForce 400 series onwards (Windows, Linux)
- Nvidia Tegra K1 (Android, Linux)
- Nvidia Tegra X1 (Android)
- PowerVR Series 6, 6XE, 6XT, 7XE and 7XT (Linux, Android)
- Vivante GC2000 series onwards (optional with GC800 and GC1000)
- panfrost: ARM panfrost support (Linux Mesa 22.0)
- v3d: Driver for Broadcom VideoCore in Mesa (Linux)
  - The Raspberry Pi 4 and 5
- VIRGL: virtual Driver for virtual machines in 2018 with Mesa 18.1 (See Mesamatrix.net)
- LLVMpipe: software driver in Mesa 20.2 (Linux)
- softpipe: software driver in Mesa 20.3 (Linux)
- Zink: emulation driver in Mesa 21.1 (Linux)
- d3d12: WSL2 linux driver for Microsoft 10+ (Mesa 22.0)
- Apple M1 and M2 graphics in Fedora Asahi Remix (Linux)

==== Android Extension Pack ====
Android Extension Pack (AEP) is a set of OpenGL ES 3.1 extensions, all bundled into a single extension introduced by Google in 2014. This allows applications to use all of the features of the set of extensions, while only testing for the presence of a single one. The AEP was officially added to Android Lollipop to provide extra features like tessellation over what was officially in the GLES 3.1 revision. OpenGL ES 3.2 update is largely made up of the AEP additions, which are already present in desktop OpenGL.

=== OpenGL ES 3.2 ===
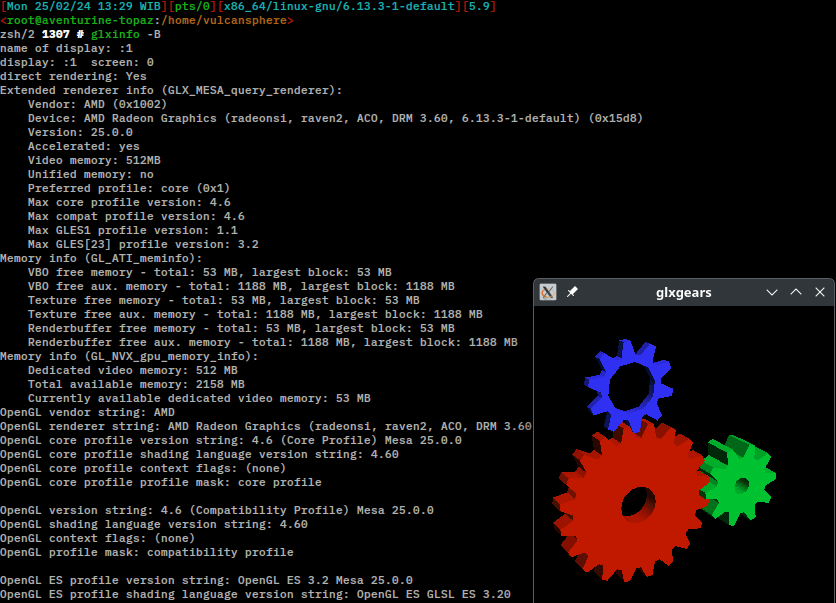
OpenGL ES 3.2 usage on a Linux system (with AMDGPU)

OpenGL ES 3.2, incorporating the Android Extension Pack (AEP), "boasts a small number of improvements over last year’s OpenGL ES 3.1. Both make use of similar features from the AEP. From the AEP, OpenGL ES 3.2 compliant hardware will support Tessellation for additional geometry detail, new geometry shaders, ASTC texture compression for a smaller memory bandwidth footprint, floating point render targets for high accuracy compute processes, and new debugging features for developers. These high-end features are already found in the group’s full OpenGL 4 specification."

Supported by Windows, Linux, Android (since version 6.0 possible, 7.0+ Vulkan 1.0 and OpenGL ES 3.2 needed) on devices with appropriate hardware and drivers, including:

- Adreno 420 and newer (Android, Linux (freedreno))
- AMD GCN-architecture (Windows, Linux (Mesa 18.2 with radeonSI))
- Intel HD Graphics Skylake and higher (Linux)
- Mali-T760 and newer (Android, Linux)
- Nvidia GeForce 400 series (Fermi) and newer (Windows, Linux)
- VIRGL: virtual Driver for virtual machines in 2018 with Mesa 18.1 (See Mesamatrix.net)
- LLVMpipe: software driver in Mesa 20 (Linux)
- Zink: Vulkan emulation driver in Mesa 21.2 (Linux)

== Deprecation in Apple platforms ==
OpenGL ES (and OpenGL) was deprecated in Apple's operating systems in favour of its own proprietary Metal graphics API, but still worked in up to at least iOS 12.

== The future ==
There is currently no plan for a new core version of OpenGL ES, as adoption of Vulkan has been deemed to displace it in embedded and mobile applications. Development of extensions to OpenGL ES continues as of 2017.

== OpenGL compatibility ==
A few libraries have been created to emulate OpenGL calls using GL ES:

- Nvidia offers a 2-clause BSD licensed library called Regal, originally started by Cass Everitt. It was last updated in 2016. Regal is used for example by Google's NaCl.
- The MIT licensed GL4ES emulates OpenGL 2.1/1.5 using GL ES 2.0/1.1. It is based on glshim.

== See also ==
- Direct3D – Windows API for high-performance 3D graphics, with 3D acceleration hardware support
- DirectX – Windows API for handling tasks related to graphics and video
- Metal – low level, high-performance 3D accelerated graphics library for Apple platforms
- OpenSL ES – API for audio on embedded systems, developed by the Khronos Group
- ANGLE (software) – Google developed library to turn OpenGL ES calls into those of DirectX or Vulkan
- Mobile 3D Graphics API - a graphics API and file format specification for developing Java ME applications
