= Sony Ericsson Yari =

Mobile phone model

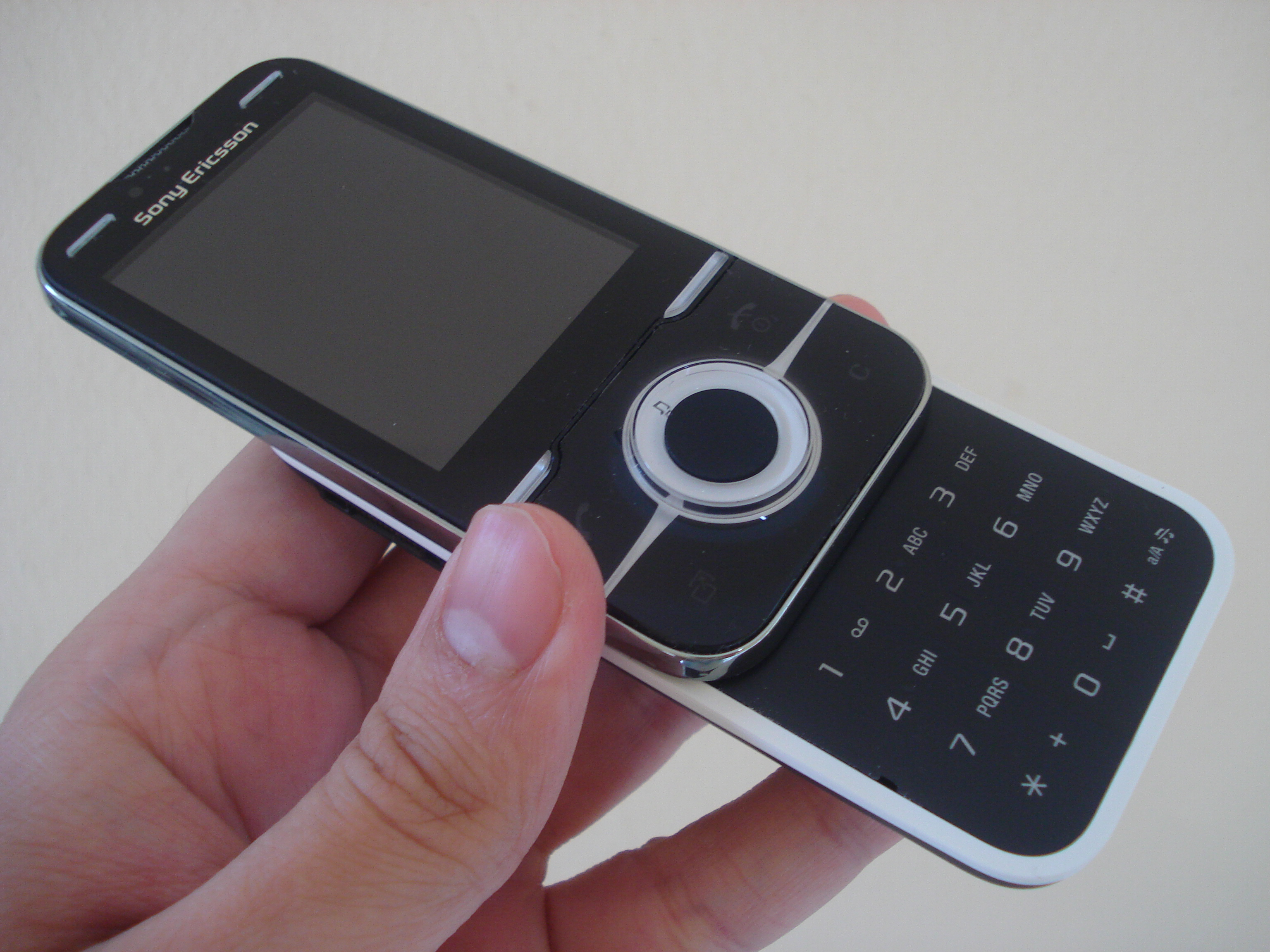
- Manufacturer: Sony Ericsson
- Availability by region: Q4 2009
- Predecessor: Sony Ericsson F305
- Related: Sony Ericsson Aino; Sony Ericsson Satio; Sony Ericsson Vivaz
- Compatible networks: UMTS, GSM
- Form factor: Slider
- Operating system: A200
- Removable storage: microSD
- Battery: 1000 mAh
- Rear camera: 5-megapixel with autofocus, LED flash
- Display: 240 x 320 TFT 16,777,216 colors
- Connectivity: Bluetooth, GPS receiver

Yari (U100i) (Kita in the Philippines) and 雅锐 (pinyin: Yǎ ruì) in China, is a slider phone from Sony Ericsson as a successor to the Sony Ericsson F305. It was unveiled on December 14, 2009. It is a phone meant for entertainment (e.g. games, music). It is available in two colors: Cranberry Red and Achromatic Black. It is the lowest end model for the Sony Ericsson entertainment series. It has three related phones, the Aino, Satio and Vivaz. It has motion sensing functions as well as an "MSN"-like chat function while sending text messages.
