= Nokia X2-00 =

Mobile phone model

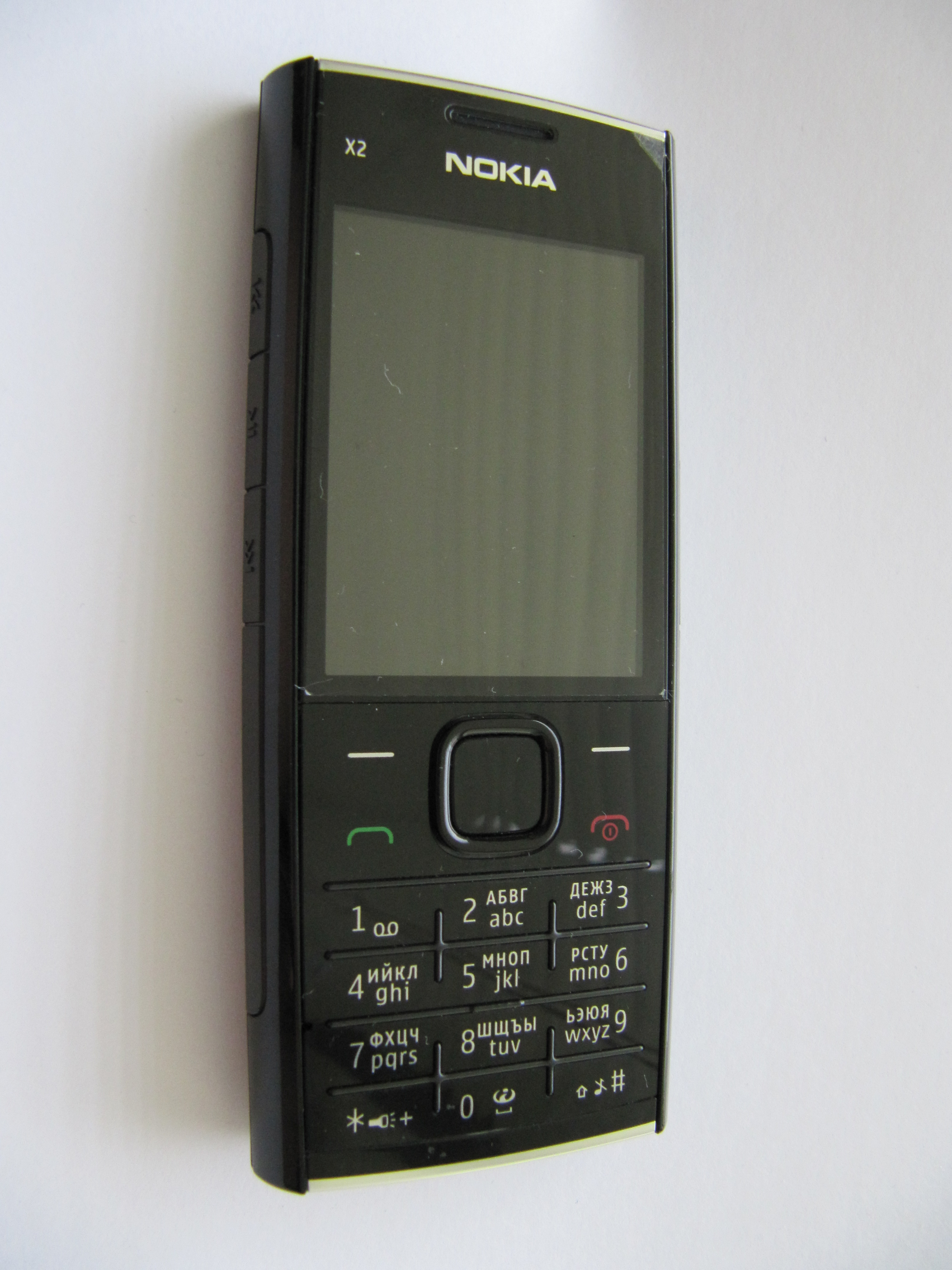
- Manufacturer: Nokia
- Type: Basic phone
- Series: Nokia Xseries
- First released: June 2010
- Availability by region: July 2010
- Discontinued: December 2012
- Predecessor: Nokia 5130; Nokia 3720 classic
- Successor: Nokia X2-02; Nokia X2-05
- Related: Nokia X2-01 (QWERTY equivalent); Nokia X3-00 (Slider equivalent)
- Compatible networks: GSM (850/900/1800/1900 MHz); GPRS and EDGE
- Form factor: Candybar
- Colors: Red on Black, Blue on SIlver
- Dimensions: 111×47×13.3 mm (4.37×1.85×0.52 in)
- Weight: 81 g (2.9 oz)
- Operating system: Nokia Series 40
- Memory: 64 MB RAM, 128 MB ROM
- Storage: 48 MB
- Removable storage: microSD, up to 16 GB
- Battery: 860 mAh Li-ion, removable (Nokia BL-4C)
- Rear camera: 5.0 MP with LED Flash and video recorder 320p@18fps
- Display: 2.2-inch (5.6 cm) 240 x 320 px (~182 ppi pixel density) TFT with 256K colors
- Sound: Stereo speakers
- Connectivity: 3.5 mm headphone jack; Bluetooth 2.1; FM radio, Stereo, RDS, built-in Antenna; USB 2.0 via MicroUSB port; USB On-The-Go
- Data inputs: Keypad
- Development status: Discontinued

Back side of Nokia X2-00 with the flashlight turned on

The Nokia X2-00 is the first low budget phone in the Xseries line from Nokia. This single SIM phone was announced in April 2010 and released in July 2010. It runs on Nokia Series 40 6th Edition operating system and comes with many pre-installed games and also supports messaging and data connections.

== Features ==
The phone has 240 x 320 256K TFT display with screen of 2.2 inches (~28.7% screen to body ratio) and weighs 81 g. It comes with a rear camera of 5 MP of 2592 x 1944 px and it also has video recording of QVGA with 320 x 240 px. The device supports Bluetooth and USB connections, but lacks infrared, Wi-Fi and GPS. It has a RAM of 64 MB, ROM of 128 MB, and supports expandable memory of 16 GB with microSD card. It's 860 mAh (BL-4C) removable battery supports standby of 624 hours and talk time of 13h 30min. It has a SAR EU 0.82 W/kg (head).

== Appearance ==
The aluminium back panel gives a metallic appearance to the feature phone. It comes in 2 colors, which are red on black and blue on silver.

== Multimedia ==
The phone supports MIDP 2.1 Java and can successfully play MP3, WMV, NRT (Nokia Ringing Tone), WMA and eAAC+ audios and also MP4, H.263 videos. The inbuilt antennae gives clarity to the FM Radio and also has RDS stereo. On the left side, seek and play/pause buttons are used to control the music/video/radio. The photo editor software in this phone also adds effects to the photos.

== Games ==
There are 8 games on the Nokia X2-00: Bounce Tales, City Bloxx, Diamond Rush, Sudoku, Snake III, Brain Champion, Block'd and Rally 3D.

== Data Connections ==
The device supports networking via GPRS and EDGE. It also has a maximum download speed of 0.236 Mbit/s.

== See also ==
- List of Nokia products
