= Nokia X7-00 =

Mobile phone model

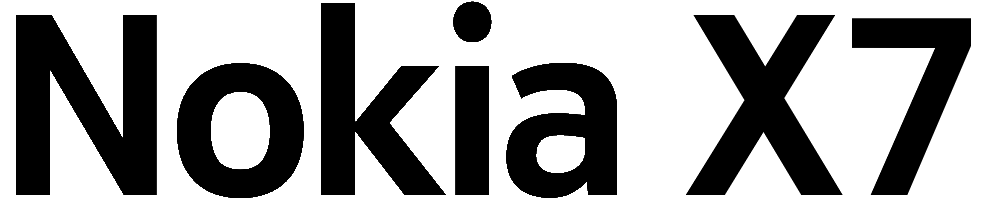

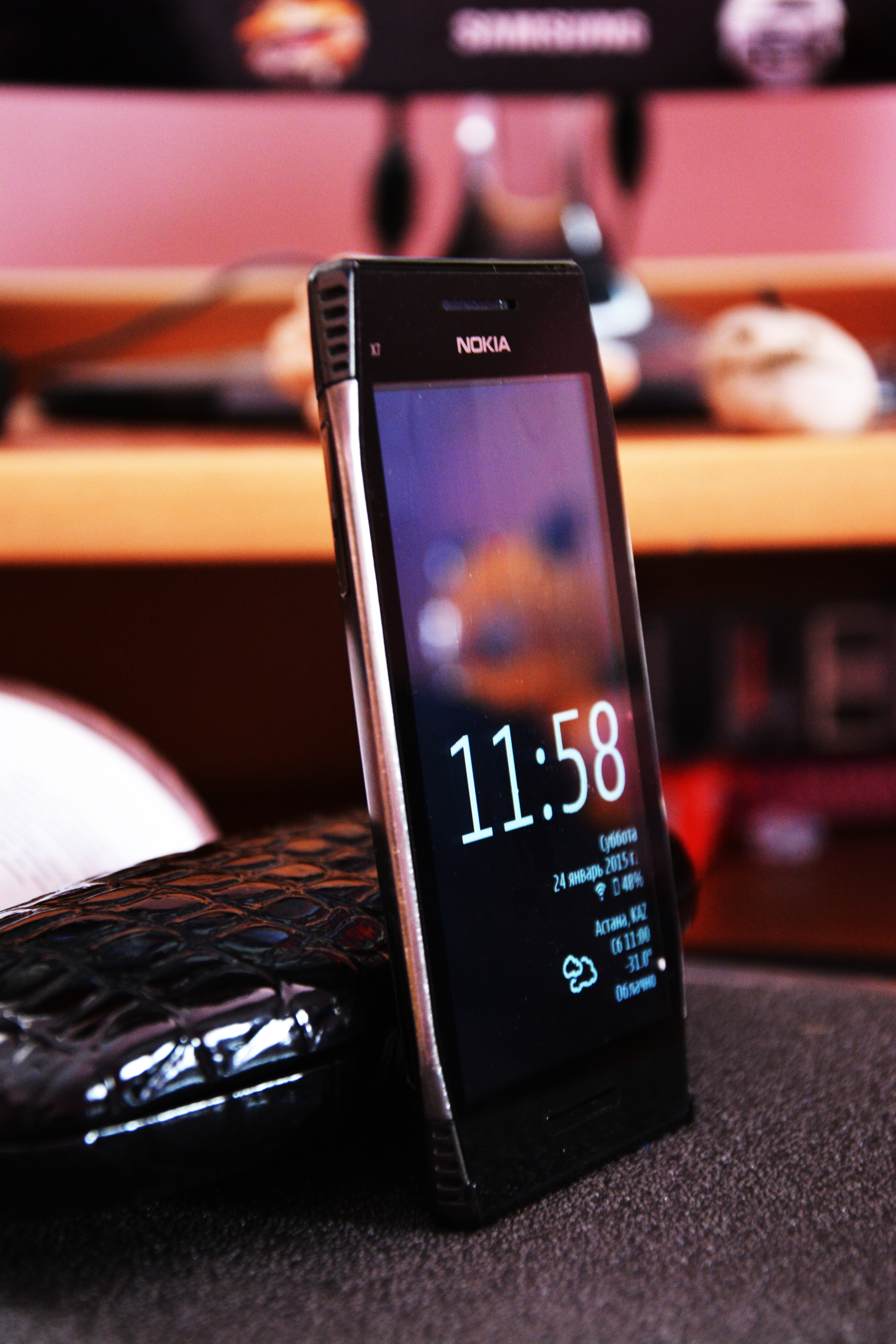
- Manufacturer: Nokia
- Series: Nokia Xseries
- Availability by region: June 2011
- Predecessor: Nokia X5; Nokia X6-00
- Successor: Nokia Lumia 710
- Compatible networks: GSM, HSDPA, HSUPA
- Dimensions: 119.7×62.8×11.9 mm (4.71×2.47×0.47 in)
- Weight: 146 g (5 oz) (0.322 lb)
- Operating system: Symbian Anna, upgradeable to Nokia Belle Refresh (111.040.1511)
- CPU: ARM11 680 MHz
- Memory: 256 MB RAM; 350MB storage 1GB ROM; Micro SD expansion up to 32 GB
- Battery: 1,200mAh Li-ion
- Rear camera: 8.0-megapixel CMOS, 2x digital zoom for image, 3x digital zoom for video, dual LED flash, Face recognition software
- Display: 640×360 4-inch (10 cm) AMOLED touchscreen
- Connectivity: Bluetooth, Wi-Fi 802.11 b/g/n USB connector and charging, 3.5mm audio connector, FM radio
- Data inputs: Capacitive touch display, Proximity sensor, Accelerometer

The Nokia X7-00 is a Symbian Anna smartphone from the Nokia Xseries. It is also the successor to X6, which was the previous multimedia touchscreen phone, with similar features and specifications in the series. The X7-00 was announced on 12 April 2011, alongside the Nokia E6.

== Features ==
- WCDMA
- Size: 119.7 × 62.8 × 11.9mm
- Display: 4.0-inch; AMOLED, 16 million colors.
- Screen resolution: 640x360 pixels (184ppi)
- Scratch-resistant capacitive touchscreen
- Integrated and Assisted GPS
- Wireless LAN (Wi-Fi)

== Other services, features or applications ==
- Calendar, Contacts, Music player, Internet, Messaging, Photos, Videos, Web TV, Office documents viewers, Mail and Radio
- OVI services: Ovi store, Ovi map, Nokia Ovi suite, Nokia Ovi Player

=== Operating times ===
- Talk time: Up to 6 hours 30 minutes
- Standby time: Up to 450 hours
- Music playback: Up to 50 hours
- Video playback: Up to 20 hours

== See also ==
- Ovi store
- Nokia C7-00
- Nokia 7 plus
- Nokia 8.1
