= Sony Ericsson F305 =

2008 mobile phone

- First released: November 2008
- Successor: Sony Ericsson Yari
- Compatible networks: GSM 850/900/1800/1900
- Dimensions: 96 mm × 47 mm × 14 mm (3.78 in × 1.85 in × 0.55 in)
- Memory: 10 MB (handset), Memory Stick Micro M2 up to 4 GB
- Display: 176 x 220 pixels, 256K Colours, 2.0 inch LCD TFT screen hd dual tft screen
- Connectivity: Bluetooth, GPRS, USB 2.0

The Sony Ericsson F305 is a GSM mobile phone created and developed by Sony Ericsson in the FUN SERIES (F series). It was first released in November 2008. It is especially designed for gamers, like the Sony Ericsson F500 which was released in 2004.

The phone comes with 11 preinstalled games that can not be deleted, and a web browser. It was succeeded by the Sony Ericsson Yari a year later.

== Specifications ==
- GSM 850 / 900 / 1800 / 1900
- 96 x 48 x 14.6 Screen Size
- 97.5 g
- 256K, 176 x 220 pixels, 2 inch LCD TFT screen
- Polyphonic and MP3 ringtones
- Speakerphone
- 1000 entries in Phone Book, Photo call
- Call Records, 30 received, dialled and missed calls
- 10 MB Handset Memory
- Memory Stick Micro (M2), up to 4 GB
- Bluetooth, GPRS, USB 2.0
- 2-megapixel camera, 1600x1200 pixels
- Video in 176x144p 15fps
- Messaging, SMS, MMS, Email, Instant Messaging
- WAP 2.0/xHTML Browser
- Stereo FM radio with RDSbass walkman system 45bits
- 9 pre-installed games + another 50 on the memory card
- Polar White & Mystic Black colours
- Java MIDP 2.0
- MP3 Player
- TrackID music recognition
- Picture editor/blogging
- Organizer
- Voice memo/dial
- Li-ion Battery
- Stand-by Up to 400 hours
- Talk time Up to 8 hours
