= Nokia X3-00 =

Cell phone model

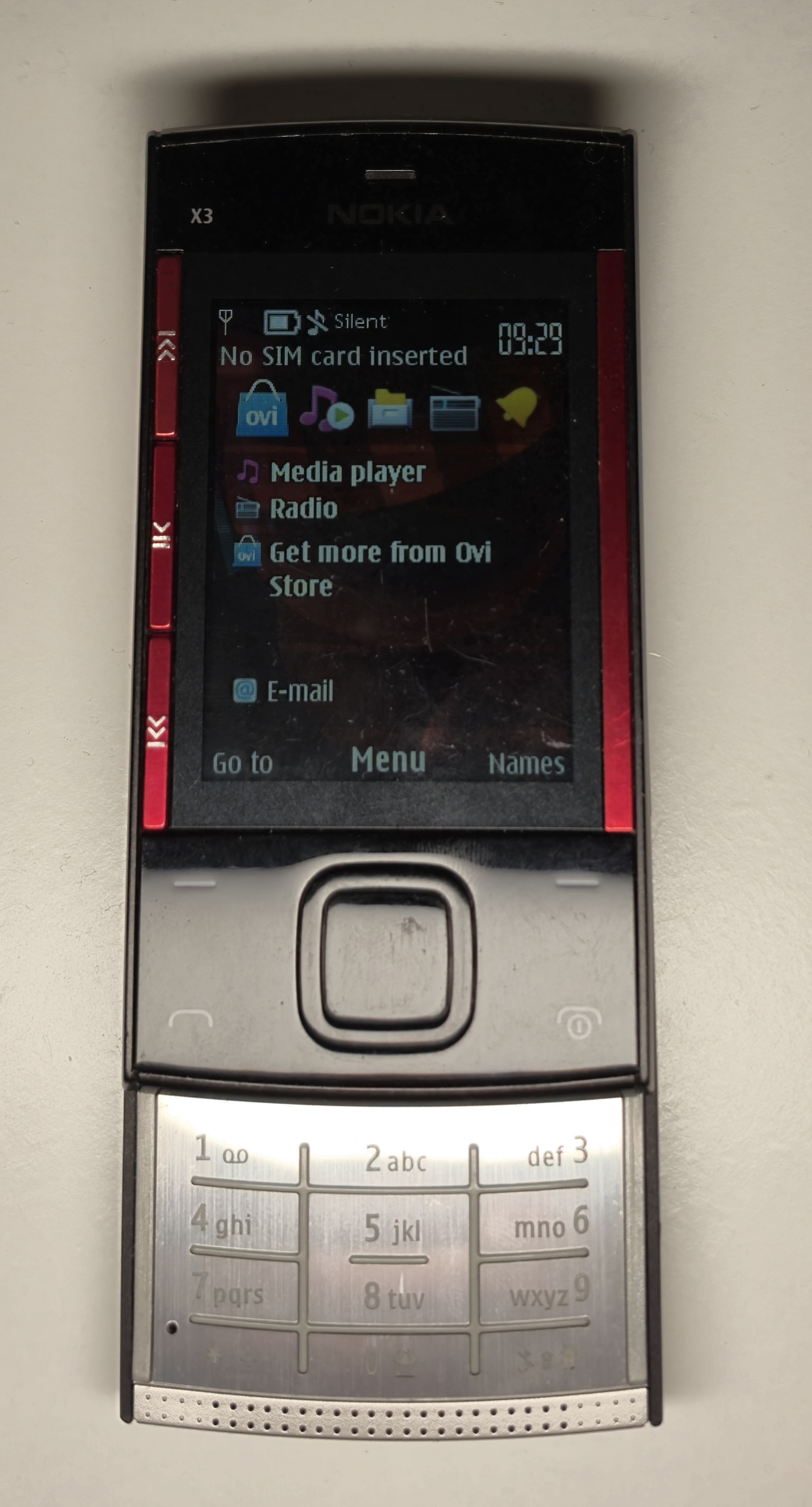
- Nokia X3-00 "Slider", released in 2009
- Manufacturer: Nokia
- Series: Nokia Xseries
- Availability by region: December 2, 2009 (worldwide)
- Discontinued: Q1 2013
- Predecessor: Nokia 5330
- Successor: Nokia X3 Touch and Type
- Related: Nokia X2-00
- Compatible networks: Quad band GSM / GPRS / EDGE GSM 850, GSM 900, GSM 1800, GSM 1900
- Form factor: slider
- Dimensions: 96 mm × 49.3 mm × 14.1 mm (3.78 in × 1.94 in × 0.56 in)
- Weight: 103 g (3.6 oz)
- Operating system: Series 40 6th Edition
- Memory: 46 MB flash memory
- Storage: microSD (up to 16 GB)
- SIM: miniSIM
- Battery: BL-4CT (Li-Ion 860 mAh, standard battery
- Rear camera: 3.2 megapixel, 2048×1536 pixels, enhanced fixed focus, digital zoom
- Display: 240×320 pixels 16:9 2.4-inch (6.1 cm) TFT LCD screen for model-00, 320x240 2.36-inch (6.0 cm) for model-01
- Connectivity: microUSB, USB 2.0, Bluetooth 2.1 with A2DP, GPRS, EDGE
- Data inputs: keypad, navigation pad, dedicated keys
- SAR: 0.73 W/kg

Nokia X3-00 (also known as Nokia X3), is a multimedia-oriented mobile phone produced by Nokia. It comes with stereo-wide speakers, built-in FM radio with RDS, a standard 3.5 mm audio jack, media player and 3.2 megapixel camera. The phone runs under the Series 40 software platform. It was announced on September 1, 2009, and later released on December 2, 2009, worldwide.

Available covers include red on black, blue on silver, and pink on silver.

It was mostly considered by reviewers to be a competitor of the Sony Ericsson W395, another music-oriented phone.

== Specifications ==
General

- 2G Network: GSM 850 / 900 / 1800 / 1900
- Announced: 2009, September
- Status: available, released December 2009

Size

- Dimensions: 96 x 49.3 x 14.1 mm, 65.8 cc
- Weight: 103 g

Display

- Type: TFT, 256K colors
- Size: 240 x 320 pixels, 2.2 inches

Sound

- Alert types: vibration; downloadable polyphonic, MP3 ringtones
- Loudspeaker: yes, with stereo speakers
- 3.5mm jack: yes, dedicated music keys

Memory

- Phonebook: 2000 entries, Photocall
- Call records: 20 dialed, 20 received, 20 missed calls
- Internal: 46 MB
- Card slot: microSD, up to 16 GB, 2 GB included

Data

- GPRS: Class 32
- EDGE: Class 32, 296 / 178.8 kbits
- Bluetooth: Yes, v2.1 with A2DP
- USB: yes, microUSB
- WiFi: no

Camera

- Primary: 3.2 MP, 2048x1536 pixels, enhanced fixed focus
- Video: yes, QCIF@15fps

Features

- Messaging: SMS (threaded view), MMS, email
- Browser: WAP 2.0/xHTML, HTML
- Radio: Stereo FM radio with RDS; built-in antenna
- Games: yes, downloadable
- Colors: red on black, blue on silver
- Java: Yes, MIDP 2.1

- MP4/H.263/H.264/WMV player
- MP3/WAV/eAAC+/WMA player
- Organizer
- Voice memo
- Flash Lite 3.0
- Predictive text input

Battery

- Battery: standard battery, Li-Ion 860 mAh (BL-4CT)
- Stand-by: up to 380 h
- Talk time: up to 7 h 30 min
- Music play: up to 26 h

Accessories

- Nokia X3-00 phone unit
- Charger
- Micro USB cable
- 3.5 mm headset
- BL-4CT standard battery
- User's manual
- Nokia brochures and leaflets
- 2 GB microSD card

== See also ==
- Nokia 3.1 Plus
