= Nokia X2-05 =

Mobile phone

- Manufacturer: Nokia
- Series: Nokia Xseries
- Availability by region: November 2011
- Predecessor: Nokia X2-00
- Successor: Nokia 301
- Related: Nokia X2-02
- Compatible networks: GSM 850/900/1800/1900 MHz
- Form factor: candybar
- Dimensions: 113×50×15 mm (4.45×1.97×0.59 in)
- Weight: 87.8 g (3 oz)
- Operating system: Series 40
- Memory: 10 MB
- Removable storage: microSD (hot swap), expandable to 32GB
- Battery: BL-5CB, Li-Ion 800 mAh: Standby: up to 25 days, Talk time: 4 hours
- Rear camera: 0.3 megapixels, VGA (640x480 px), fixed focus
- Display: 2.2" TFT, 240x320 px QVGA
- Data inputs: numeric keypad
- Development status: Discontinued
- Website: Nokia X2-05 support page at Microsoft

Nokia X2-05 is an entry-level mobile phone running on the Nokia Series 40 operating system. It was announced on October 11, 2011 and was released two months later. The phone was available in Black, Silver, White and Bright Red, and came with a stereo headset and a MicroUSB cable. The suggested price was €46 before taxes and excluding subsidies (SIM-free).

== Features ==
Nokia X2-05 is focussed on music: it has support for a wide range of audio formats, such as MP3, MP4, AAC, AAC+, AMR-NB. The handset has a built-in 106phon loudspeaker and includes an FM radio with a speakerphone option and a possibility to record radio transmissions. The phone can be connected via USB either via Nokia PC Suite, or act as a USB mass storage device. The device supports Bluetooth v2.1, including A2DP and EDR profiles.

== Software ==
The X2-05 comes with an audio player, Nokia Browser 1.0, which uses compression technology, e-mail, instant messaging, Facebook and Twitter client apps, and supports Java for third-party applications, which can be downloaded from the Nokia Store (Opera Store as of July 2015).

Nokia Life Tools 1.7 was included on devices made for Chinese, Indonesian, Indian, and Nigerian markets.

Devices for the Chinese market included Mobile QQ (an instant messaging program popular in China) and a Chinese dictionary.

MSN Messenger IM functionality may not work, because Microsoft shut down the .NET Messaging Service in favour of Skype. Alternative instant messaging services are supported via Java (J2ME) apps.
