= Nokia X2-01 =

Discontinued mobile phone

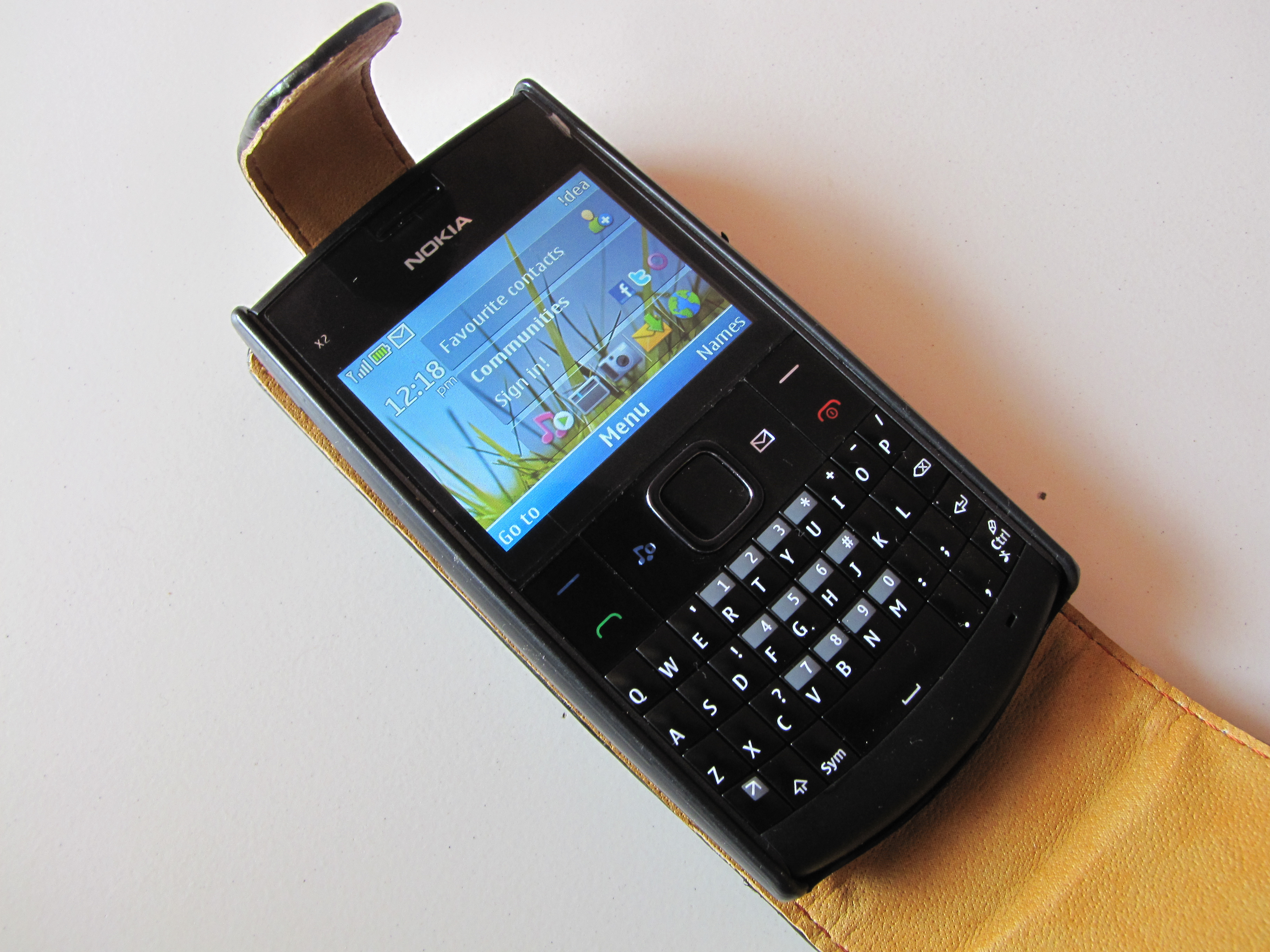
- Manufacturer: Nokia
- Series: Nokia Xseries
- Availability by region: January 2011
- Predecessor: Nokia 5130
- Successor: Nokia Asha 200/201
- Related: Nokia X2-00; Nokia C3-00
- Form factor: Candybar
- Dimensions: 119.4×59.8×14.3 mm (4.70×2.35×0.56 in)
- Weight: 107.5 g (4 oz) (with battery)
- Operating system: Series 40 V 08.71 FOTA (firmware update over the air)
- CPU: Broadcom BCM21351 208MHz (Juno)
- Memory: Internal - 55 MB, 64 MB RAM, 128 MB ROM
- Storage: up to 2000 entries
- Removable storage: Expandable to 8GB
- Battery: Standard battery, Li-Ion 1020 (BL-5C) Stand-by Up to 480 h Talk time Up to 4 h 30 min
- Rear camera: VGA
- Display: 2.4" (61 mm) Resolution: 320 x 240 pixels (TFT) 262,000 colors
- Connectivity: Bluetooth version 2.1 with Enhanced Data Rate, High-Speed USB 2.0
- Data inputs: Full QWERTY, Dedicated music and messaging keys
- Development status: Discontinued

The Nokia X2-01 is a low-cost feature phone running the Nokia S40 mobile operating system, released under the X-series line of phones by Nokia. It features a full QWERTY keyboard. It was advertised as an entry-level messaging and music phone. It was similar to the Nokia X2-00, the main differences being that it had a QWERTY keyboard, the display was smaller and it had a downgraded VGA camera with no flash.

== Features ==
Nokia X2-01 was a basic phone with installed extra features of Ovi Mail and Ovi Chat where users can set up email and chat accounts directly from the device. The X2-01 also had a VGA camera, 2.4-inch (61mm) screen, and support for up to 8 GB of storage on a MicroSD card. The phone was available in various colours: black-titanium, black-red, black-azure, white silver, white-pink. (Availability of some colours were dependent on the region).

== Specifications ==
- General
  - 2G Network: GSM 850 / 900 / 1800 / 1900
  - Announced: 2010, November
  - Status: Discontinued. Released 2011, January
- Body
  - Dimensions: 119.4 x 59.8 x 14.3 mm, 86.6 cc
  - Weight: 107.5 g
  - Keyboard: QWERTY
  - Dedicated music key
- Display
  - Type: TFT, 256K colors
  - Size: 320 x 240 pixels, 2.4" (61 mm) (~167 ppi pixel density)
- Sound
  - Alert types: Vibration, Polyphonic(64), WAV, MP3 ringtones
  - Loudspeaker: Yes
  - 3.5 mm jack: Yes
  - Dedicated music key
- Cameras
  - Primary: VGA, 640 x 480 pixels
  - Video: Yes, QVGA@24 fps
  - Secondary: No
- Features
  - Messaging: SMS, MMS, Email
  - Browser: WAP 2.0/xHTML, HTML (Opera Mini)
  - Radio: Stereo FM radio with RDS
  - Games: Yes plus downloadable
  - GPS: No
  - Java: Yes, MIDP 2.1
  - Colors: Red, Deep Grey, Silver, Lilac, And Azure, white
  - MP4/H.264/H.263/WMV video player
  - MP3/WAV/WMA/AAC audio player
  - Organizer
  - Voice memo, and ability to keep track of notes
  - Predictive text input
- Battery
  - Battery: Standard battery, Li-Ion 1020 (BL-5C)
  - Stand-by: Up to 480 h
  - Talk time: Up to 4 h 30 min
