= Nokia 3720 classic =

Mobile phone model

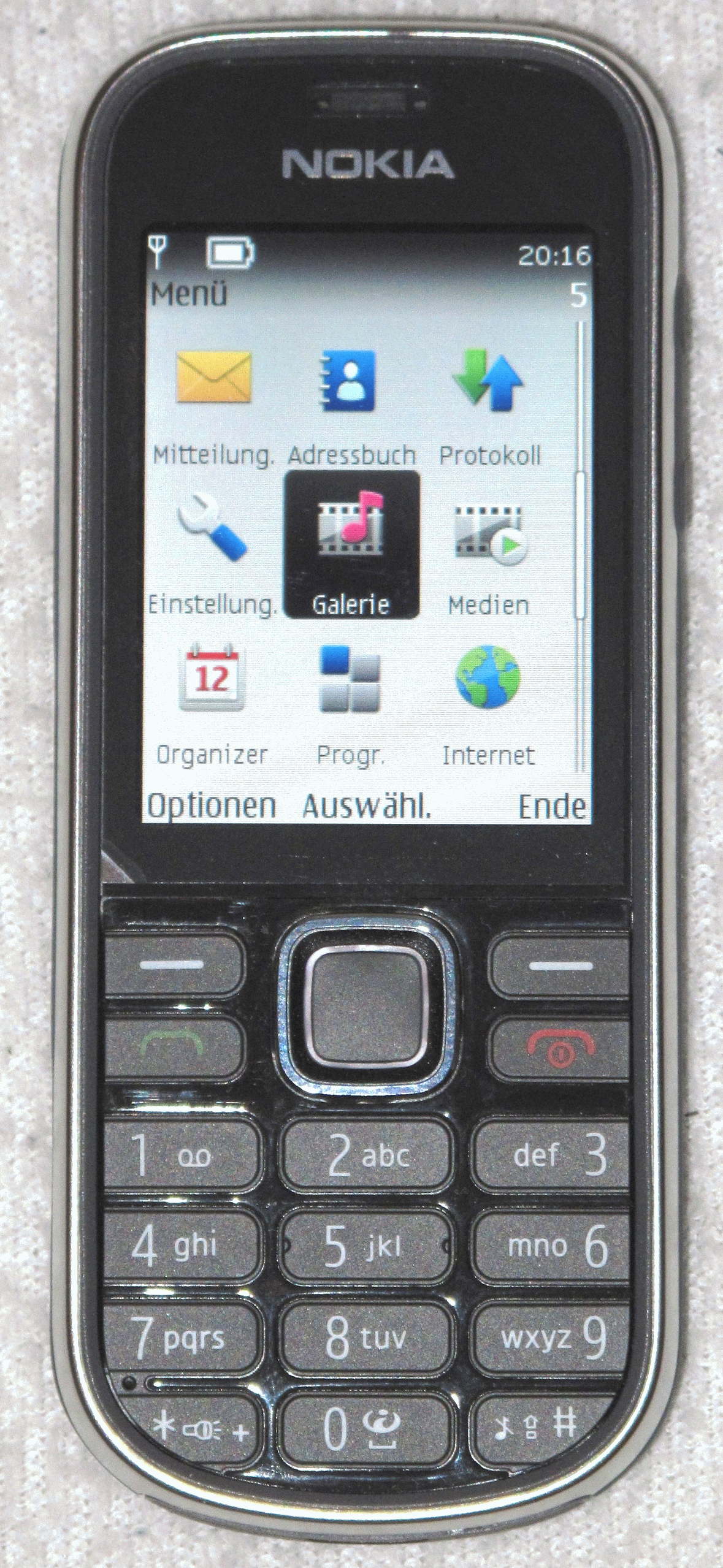
- Manufacturer: Nokia Hungary
- Availability by region: July 2009
- Discontinued: May 2010
- Predecessor: Nokia 3110 classic Nokia 5500 Sport
- Successor: Nokia X2-00
- Compatible networks: GSM 900/1800/1900
- Form factor: Candybar
- Dimensions: 115×47×15.3 mm (4.53×1.85×0.60 in)
- Weight: 94 g (3.3 oz)
- Operating system: Series 40 6th Ed
- Memory: 20MB internal
- Battery: BL-5CT 1050 mAh
- Rear camera: 2.0 megapixels
- Display: 2 inch QVGA LCD (16.7 million colors)
- Connectivity: Bluetooth 2.0, Micro-USB, 2.5 mm Nokia AV connector

The Nokia 3720 classic is a mobile phone by Nokia announced in July 2009 and manufactured in Hungary. The phone runs the Series 40 6th edition platform.

This phone is IP54 rated against water, dust and is also shock proof. This makes the phone Nokia's first IP certified device. Nokia has released videos showing how rugged this device is such as being placed under water, kicked by a rugby boot and hit by a golf club.

== Technical specifications ==
- Series 40 6th Edition
- J2ME (Java ME) MIDP 2.0 MIDlets (apps) support
- IEC 60529/Level IP54 certified to be water and dust resistant
- Tri-band GSM / GPRS / EDGE: GSM 900 / 1800 / 1900
- 96 MB memory (NAND and SDRAM) with a total of 20 MB for user storage
- 2.0-megapixel (1600×1200) camera
- Bluetooth 2.1
- USB 2.0 (microUSB)
- microSD expandable up to 8GB
- Music player supporting AAC, AAC+, AMR, eAAC+, MIDI, Mobile XMF, MP3, MP4, WAV and WMA
- LED Torch

== See also ==
- IP Code
- MIL-STD-810
- Rugged computer
