= Nokia X10 =

2021 smartphone model

Nokia X10 Nokia X20 Nokia X100
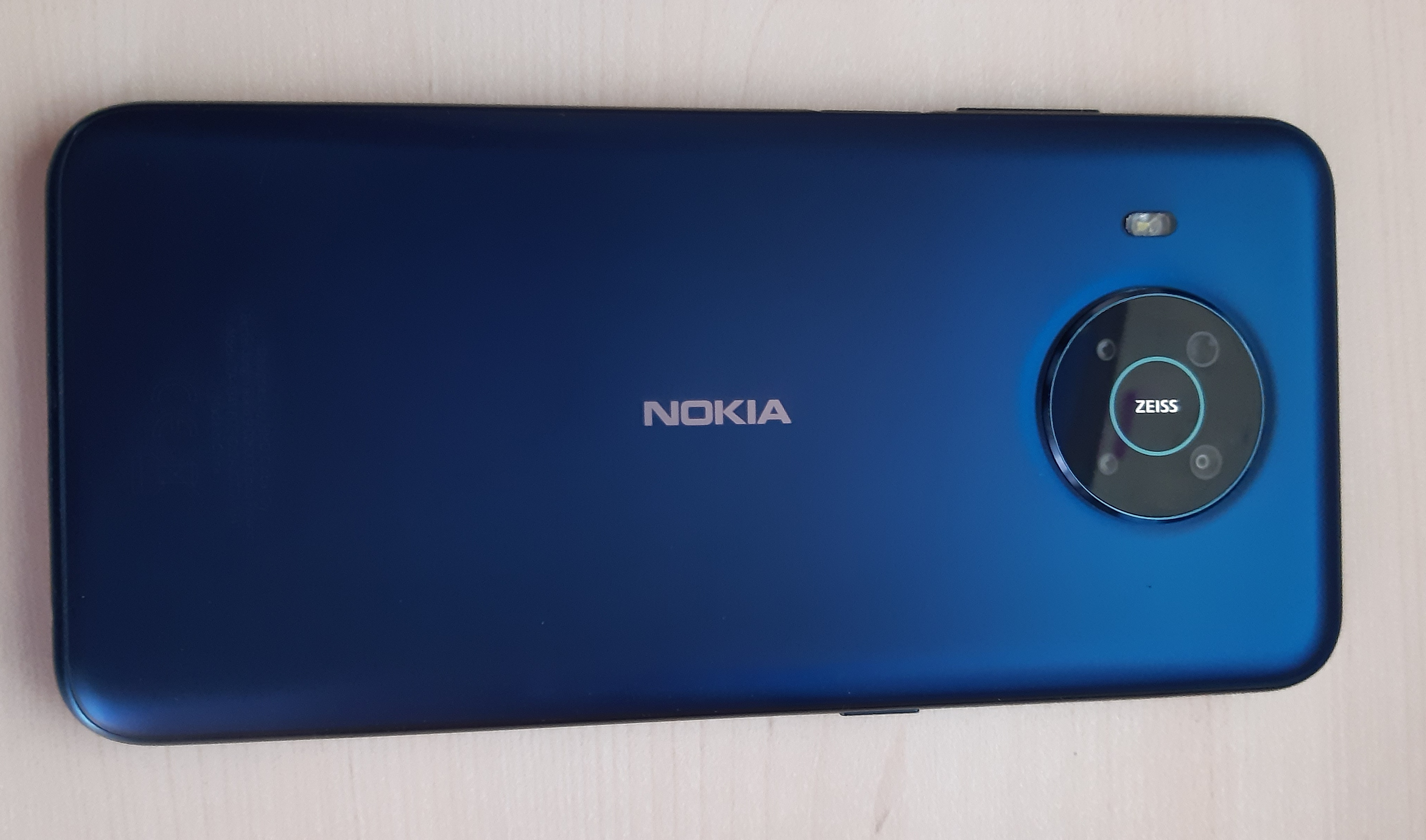
- Rear panel of Nokia X20
- Brand: Nokia
- Developer: HMD Global
- Manufacturer: ChinoE
- Type: Phablet
- Series: X
- First released: X10/X20: April 8, 2021; 5 years ago X100: November 9, 2021; 4 years ago
- Successor: Nokia X30
- Compatible networks: GSM, 3G, 4G (LTE), 5G
- Form factor: Slate
- Colors: X10: Forest, Snow; X20: Midnight Sun, Nordic Blue; X100: Midnight Blue
- Dimensions: H: X10/X20: 168.9 mm (6.65 in); X100: 171.4 mm (6.75 in); W: 79.7 mm (3.14 in); D: 9.1 mm (0.36 in)
- Weight: X10: 210 g (7.4 oz); X20: 220 g (7.8 oz); X100: 217 g (7.7 oz)
- Operating system: Initial: Android 11; Current: X10/X20: Android 14; X100: Android 13
- System-on-chip: Qualcomm SM4350 Snapdragon 480 5G (8 nm)
- CPU: Octa-core (2x2.0 GHz Kryo 460 & 6x1.8 GHz Kryo 460)
- GPU: Adreno 619
- Memory: X10: 4/6 GB; X20: 6/8 GB; X100: 6 GB; LPDDR4X
- Storage: X10: 64/128 GB; X20/X100: 128 GB
- Removable storage: microSDXC up to 512 GB
- SIM: X10/X20: Nano-SIM or Hybrid Dual SIM (Nano-SIM); X100: Nano-SIM
- Battery: Non-removable, Li-Po 4470 mAh
- Charging: 18 W fast charging
- Rear camera: Wide: X10/X100: 48 MP, f/1.79, PDAF; X20: 64 MP, f/1.79, PDAF; Ultrawide: 5 MP; Macro: 2 MP, f/2.4; Depth: 2 MP, f/2.4; Other: Zeiss optics, LED flash, HDR, panorama; Video: X10/X100: 1080p@30fps X20: 1080p@30/60fps
- Front camera: X10: 8 MP (wide); X20: 32 MP (wide); X100: 16 MP (wide); Video: 1080p@30fps
- Display: IPS LCD, 6.67", 2400 × 1080 (FHD+), 20:9 ratio, 395 ppi
- Water resistance: Splash protection
- Model: X10: TA-1332, TA-1350; X20: TA-1341, TA-1344; X100: TA-1399
- Made in: China
- Website: Nokia X10 official website Nokia X20 official website

The Nokia X10 and Nokia X20 are mid-range 5G smartphones developed by HMD Global under the Nokia brand. They were announced on April 8, 2021.

Additionally, on November 9, 2021, the Nokia X100 was announced exclusively for T-Mobile US and Metro by T-Mobile. It is a slightly modified version of the Nokia X10 featuring an upgraded front camera and slightly larger top and bottom display bezels.

== Design ==
The front panel of the Nokia X10 and X100 is made of Corning Gorilla Glass 3, while the Nokia X20 uses Gorilla Glass 5. The frame and back panel are constructed from plastic.

On the back, like most Nokia smartphones from 2020–2021, the devices feature a circular camera island.

The bottom houses a 3.5 mm audio jack, a microphone, a USB-C port, and a speaker, while the top features a secondary microphone. On the left side, there is a dedicated Google Assistant button and, depending on the model, a hybrid slot (2 SIM cards or 1 SIM card + microSD) or a single SIM slot with microSD for the Nokia X10 and X20, and a single SIM slot with microSD for the Nokia X100. On the right side are the volume buttons and a power/lock button with an integrated fingerprint scanner.

The Nokia X10 was available in Forest (green) and Snow (white), the X20 in Midnight Sun (bronze) and Nordic Blue, and the X100 in Midnight Blue.

== Specifications ==
=== Hardware ===
The devices are powered by the Qualcomm Snapdragon 480 processor with an Adreno 619 GPU.

The battery capacity is 4470 mAh and supports 18 W fast charging.

The Nokia X10 was sold in 6/64 GB, 4/128 GB, and 6/128 GB configurations; the X20 in 6/128 GB and 8/128 GB; and the X100 exclusively in a 6/128 GB configuration. Storage on all models can be expanded with a microSD card up to 512 GB.

=== Camera ===
All models feature a quad-camera setup on the rear with Zeiss optics, consisting of a 48 MP main wide sensor on the Nokia X10 and X100 and a 64 MP main wide sensor on the Nokia X20 (both with f/1.79 aperture and phase-detection autofocus), a 5 MP ultrawide lens, a 2 MP macro lens, and a 2 MP depth sensor with f/2.4 aperture. The main camera on the Nokia X10 and X100 supports video recording up to 1080p@30fps, while the Nokia X20 supports up to 1080p@30/60fps.

The front camera is an 8 MP wide lens on the Nokia X10, 32 MP on the Nokia X20, and 16 MP on the Nokia X100. All models support front-camera video recording at 1080p@30fps.

=== Display ===
The display is a 6.67-inch IPS LCD with FHD+ resolution (2400 × 1080), a 20:9 aspect ratio, a pixel density of 395 ppi, and a center-aligned punch-hole cutout for the front-facing camera.

=== Software ===
The models were launched running stock Android 11. The Nokia X10 and X20 were updated to Android 14 from the three-year software update, while the Nokia X100 was updated to Android 13.

==== Software updates ====
- July 2022 - Upgraded to Android 13 with June 2022 security patches.
- September 2024 - Upgraded to Android 14.
