= X2 (soundtrack) =

Soundtrack to the 2003 film

X2: Original Motion Picture Score

Film score by John Ottman
- Released: April 29, 2003
- Recorded: 2002–2003
- Genre: Film score
- Length: 60:09
- Label: Trauma
- Producer: Casey Stone

John Ottman chronology
Trapped (2002)	X2 (2003)	Gothika (2003)

X2: Original Motion Picture Score is the soundtrack to the 2003 film of the same name directed by Bryan Singer. Based on the X-Men superhero team appearing in Marvel Comics. It is the sequel to X-Men (2000), as well as the second installment in the X-Men film series. The film's score was composed by John Ottman, and produced by Casey Stone. The album was released by Trauma Records, three days before the film's release. An expanded version of the film's score, was later published by La-La Land Records and Fox Music in July 2012.

== Development ==
Singer's frequent collaborator, John Ottman composed the film score for X2; Ottman previously intended to score the predecessor X-Men (2000) but due to scheduling conflicts he was replaced by Michael Kamen. Ottman excited on working in this film, as apart from being a large-scale project, he liked the world of X-Men and felt that "it's often the little subtle moments in the score that I remember being really happy with, which, for me, exemplify the power of film music in terms of defining characters". He cited the sequence in the X-Jet where Magneto (Ian McKellen) asks Pyro's name, as after Pyro confesses the theme comes as he manipulates his little flame, beginning with a kind of vulnerability but as Magneto passes the lighter, Pyro's theme swells subtly with male choir that crossing it to a darker side. While writing the theme at 3:00 a.m. he felt "he aced it" as more people did not notice those little moments, which made him most excited.

The other part he recalled about to score out-of-the-box sequences for the White House attack with the X-Men team and Kurt Wagner / Nightcrawler (Alan Cumming), where scoring the sequence with action music reduced it to another action scene which resulted him to use a sample of Wolfgang Amadeus Mozart's Requiem as the basis for the film's score. Since the original recording did not work well, he added percussion and anvil sounds resulting in being "an odd but aggressive piece of music" that elevated the sequence. He also cited Nightcrawler's religious and linguistic roots (he was a German) influenced him to modify that theme.

== Reception ==
Morag Reavley of BBC called it as "an engaging and surprisingly listenable score, with Ottman a worthy contender for the epic adventure musical crown." Heather Phares of AllMusic wrote "It's not the most inspired score, but Ottman's music more than serves its purpose, and fans who enjoyed the music in the movie will most likely appreciate this album as well." James Southall of Movie Wave wrote "the music sounds like the well-intentioned product of an enthusiastic amateur rather than a real film score for a film of this scale." Music critic Jonathan Broxton wrote "the X-Men 2 score is a step in the right direction for Ottman, who following his impressive burst onto the music scene, has been floundering in low-key indie-land for several years. Ignoring the blatant Henry Mancini reference, the thematic consistency and some of the action writing on show here proves that Ottman and his conductor Damon Intrabartolo have an impressive mastery of a large symphony orchestra. All he needs to do now is liven up his transitional cues, and X-Men 3 (whenever it is released) could be a knockout."

Filmtracks.com wrote "the music for X2 is a definite improvement over Kamen's original, and Ottman collectors will be pleased with the effort. Because of Singer's departure from the franchise, Ottman has lamented the lack of an opportunity to continue development of his character themes in subsequent scores. He style isn't as flashy as John Powell's stance in X-Men: The Last Stand, nor does Ottman approach the ambitious generation of grandiose, epic sound that Powell would explore. But in X2 he finally introduced a distinguished title theme and consistently harmonic component to the series, and the liberal choral addition roots the score and film in their proper genre. X-Men enthusiasts should especially feast on this one." Matt Goldberg of Collider praised the score as "tremendous". William Thomas of Empire said that Ottman's "prudent pruning gives the film real momentum".

== Track listing ==
2003 album track listing
No.	Title	Length
1.	"Suite from X2 "	7:11
2.	"Storm's Perfect Storm"	2:18
3.	"Finding Faith"	1:31
4.	"Sneaky Mystique"	3:30
5.	"Cerebro"	1:27
6.	"Mansion Attack"	7:34
7.	"Rogue Earns Her Wings"	1:35
8.	"It's Time"	3:40
9.	"Magneto's Old Tricks"	4:59
10.	"I'm In"	4:11
11.	"If You Really Knew"	3:21
12.	"Playing With Fire"	2:45
13.	"Death Strikes Deathstryke"	4:52
14.	"Getting Out Alive"	3:59
15.	"Goodbye"	5:28
16.	"We're Here to Stay"	1:48
Total length:		60:09

== Expanded edition ==
X2: Expanded Score from the Motion Picture

Film score by John Ottman
- Released: July 19, 2012
- Genre: Soundtrack
- Length: 112:25
- Labels: La-La Land Records; Fox Music
- Producer: Casey Stone

La-La Land Records and Fox Music issued an expanded version of Ottman's score in double-discs on July 19, 2012, that contains previously unreleased material. The score also included the specially recorded version of Alfred Newman's 20th Century Fox fanfare incorporating Ottman's film theme.

2012 album track listing – Disc 1
No.	Title	Length
1.	"20th Century Fox Fanfare" (†)	0:22
2.	"Opening Titles" (†)	1:07
3.	"Nightcrawler Attack" (†)	3:15
4.	"Alkali Lake" (†)	2:03
5.	"Jean's Hallucination / Something Terrible" (†)	1:03
6.	"Newscast/Permission/Reunion" (†)	3:44
7.	"Cerebro"	1:28
8.	"Sneaky Mystique" (†)	4:04
9.	"Meeting Nightcrawler" (†)	2:20
10.	"You Remember Him" (†)	2:32
11.	"Mansion Attack / Don't You Remember / Escape" (†)	7:53
12.	"Opening Cerebro / Bottom's Up" (†)	1:55
13.	"Jason's Story / Harmless Kiss" (†)	3:29
14.	"Magneto's Escape" (†)	1:25
15.	"What Bobby Can Do / Finding Faith" (†)	2:51
16.	"Pyro Attack" (†)	3:13
17.	"Xavier Escapes"	1:26
18.	"Storm's Perfect Storm / Missiles"	2:07
19.	"Fireside Chat / Flashback / Jean and Logan / You Know What I Want" (†)	5:02
20.	"God Among Insects / Where Is Everyone?" (†)	2:08
21.	"I'm In" (†)	4:17
22.	"It's Time" (†)	3:51
Total length:		60:09

2012 album track listing – Disc 2
No.	Title	Length
1.	"The Children / Something's Wrong" (†)	2:36
2.	"Augmentation Room (Death Strikes Deathstrike)" (†)	4:45
3.	"Deathstrike Dies / Magneto's Old Tricks" (†)	5:52
4.	"Wolverine to the Rescue" (†)	8:10
5.	"Rogue Earns Wings" (†)	2:20
6.	"Goodbye / We're Here to Stay" (†)	7:08
7.	"Evolution Leaps Forward" (†)	3:09
8.	"Suite from X-Men 2 (End Credits original version)"	7:11
9.	"Evolution Leaps Forward (original version)" (†)	0:48
10.	"Suite from X-Men 2 (End Credits film version)" (†)	9:07
Total length:		52:16
