= Nokia 5130 =

Cell phone model

Nokia 5130 XpressMusic
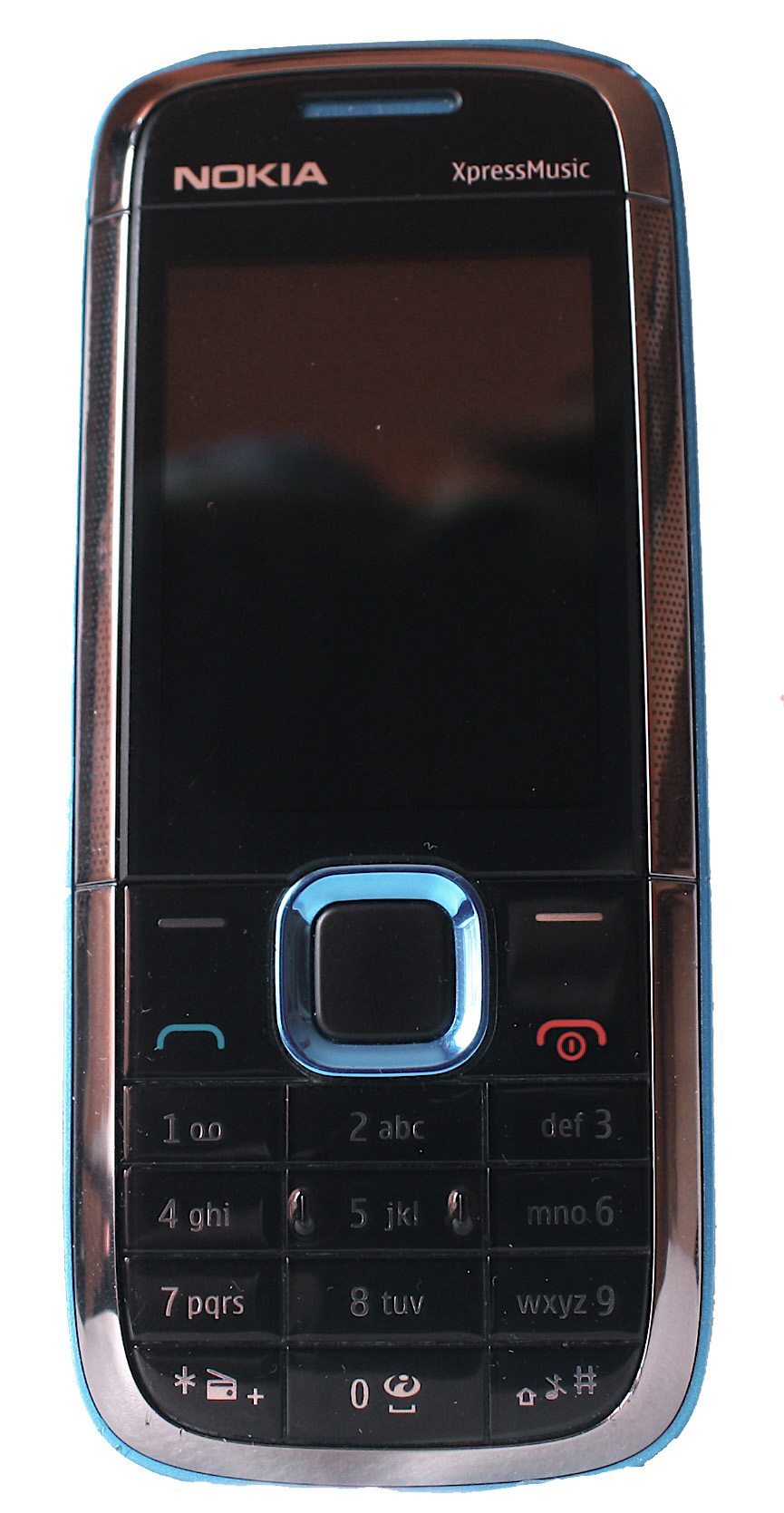
- Nokia 5130 XpressMusic (blue edition)
- Also known as: Nokia 5130c, Nokia 5130c-2, Nokia RM-495, Nokia RM-496
- Manufacturer: Nokia
- First released: November 2008
- Availability by region: February 2009
- Discontinued: January 2011
- Predecessor: Nokia 5310; Nokia 5220; Nokia 3110 classic
- Successor: Nokia X2-00; Nokia X2-01
- Compatible networks: Quad-band GSM 845 900 1800 1900 * GPRS multislot class 32 max. 88 kbit/s * EDGE class 32 max. 296 kbit/s
- Form factor: Candybar
- Dimensions: 107.5 mm (4.23 in) H 46.7 mm (1.84 in) W 14.8 mm (0.58 in) D
- Weight: 88 g (3.1 oz)
- Operating system: Series 40 (5th edition Feature Pack 1)
- CPU: 234 MHz ARM9
- Removable storage: microSDHC (supports up to 32 GB)
- Battery: Li-ion (BL-5C, 1020 mAh); Battery Life: Talk time (maximum): – GSM 6 h, Standby time (maximum): – GSM 288 h, Video playback time (maximum): 4 h, Video recording time (maximum): 1 h, Music playback time (maximum): 21 h,
- Charging: 2.0 mm charger connector
- Rear camera: 2 MP with 4x digital zoom, video recording (128×96 px. or 176×144 px. at 15 fps max.)
- Display: LCD; 240x320 px QVGA; Colors: 256 thousand (24-bit); Resolution: 240 × 320 pixels (QVGA)
- Sound: 3.5mm stereo audio jack (Supported audio formats: WAV, AAC, eAAC, eAAC+, MP3, MP4, MIDI, WMA, WAMR, MXMF, AMR)
- Connectivity: built-in Micro-USB (hot swap); Bluetooth 2.0 with A2DP
- Data inputs: Keypad
- Other: FM radio Standard 3.5 mm headphone jack, voice memo Games: Bounce Tales, Rally 3D, Snake III

Nokia 5130 XpressMusic is a mobile phone manufactured by Nokia. It belongs to the XpressMusic series of phones, and runs on Nokia's Series 40 platform.

== Main features ==
The phone's Series 40 (S40) platform comes with Java MIDP 2.0 and Adobe Flash Lite 3.0. The phone has a 240x320 resolution screen and a physical alphanumeric type keypad. It has a rear-facing 2.0 megapixel camera that supports still imaging and video recording. Its music player supports MP3, AAC, WMA, WAV, AMR and a few other formats. The phone has a built-in Opera Mini browser and Windows Live support for instant messaging.
