= Nokia X30 =

2022 Nokia Smartphone manufactured by HMD Global

- Brand: Nokia
- Developer: HMD Global
- Manufacturer: Hisense
- Type: Smartphone
- Series: X
- First released: September 1, 2022; 3 years ago
- Predecessor: Nokia X10, Nokia X20
- Successor: HMD Skyline
- Related: Nokia XR21
- Compatible networks: GSM, 3G, 4G (LTE), 5G
- Form factor: Slate
- Colors: Cloudy Blue, Ice White
- Dimensions: 158.9×73.9×7.99 mm (6.256×2.909×0.315 in)
- Weight: 185 g (7 oz)
- Operating system: Original: Android 12; Current: Android 14
- System-on-chip: Qualcomm SM6375 Snapdragon 695 5G (8 nm)
- CPU: Octa-core (2×2.2 GHz Kryo 660 Gold & 6×1.7 GHz Kryo 660 Silver)
- GPU: Adreno 619
- Memory: 6/8 GB LPDDR4X
- Storage: 128 GB UFS 2.2, 256 GB UFS 3.0
- SIM: Nano-SIM + eSIM or Dual SIM (Nano-SIM)
- Battery: Non-removable, Li-Po 4200 mAh
- Charging: 33 W fast charging Quick Charge 3.0, Power Delivery 3.0
- Rear camera: 50 MP, f/1.9 (wide-angle), 1/1.56", 1 µm, PDAF, OIS + 13 MP, f/2.4, 123˚ (ultrawide), 1/3.06"; LED flash, HDR, panorama Video: 1080p@30/60fps
- Front camera: 16 MP, f/2.4 (wide-angle), 1/3.06", 1 µm Video: 1080p@30fps
- Display: AMOLED, 90 Hz, 6.43", 2400 × 1080 (FHD+), 20:9, 409 ppi
- Sound: Mono
- Connectivity: USB-C 2.0, Bluetooth 5.1 (A2DP, LE, aptX HD), NFC, FM radio (RDS), Wi-Fi 802.11 a/b/g/n/ac/6 (dual-band, Wi-Fi Direct), GPS, A-GPS, GLONASS, Galileo, BeiDou
- Water resistance: IP67
- Model: TA-1443, TA-1450
- Codename: Witch
- SAR: Head 0.79 W/kg; Body 1.37 W/kg
- Made in: China
- Other: Fingerprint sensor (under display, optical), accelerometer, gyroscope, proximity sensor, compass
- Website: www.hmd.com/en_int/nokia-x-30

The Nokia X30 is a mid-range smartphone manufactured by HMD Global under the brand Nokia. It was first announced on September 1, 2022, alongside the Nokia C31 and Nokia G60 and the successor of the Nokia X10 and Nokia X20.

It was installed with IP67 for resistance from splash and dust. The phone can withstand up to 30 mins after submerging with water at a depth of 1 meter.

== Specifications ==
=== Hardware ===
The X30 is powered by the Qualcomm Snapdragon 695 5G system on a chip, a 2x 2.2 GHz Kryo 660 Gold & 6x1.7 GHz Kryo 660 Silver and the Adreno 619 GPU. The battery is a Li-Po 4200 mAh with fast charging support up to 33 W. Charging to full battery can take up to 90 minutes. It also supports Quick Charge 3.0 and Power Delivery 3.0. The smartphone was sold in 6/128, 8/128 and 8/256 GB of internal memory storage. There is also 128GB UFS 2.2 and 256GB UFS 3.0 support for the Nokia X30.

It has a camera island made of aluminium, with 2 cameras at the back of the phone panel, featuring a 50MP wide-angle lens (aperture f/1.9) with a phase detection autofocus and optical image stabilization, and a 13MP ultra-wide-angle lens (aperture f/2.4) with an angle of 123°. The front camera has a 16MP lens (aperture f/2.4). Both the main and front cameras can record up to 1080p (60fps for the main, and 30fps for the front).

=== Software ===
The X30 is initially released with the Android 12 operating system and was updated to Android 14.
