= 7900 =

7900 may refer to:

== Technology ==
- GeForce 7900 series, a line of graphics processing units from Nvidia
- Nikon Coolpix 7900, a digital camera model
- Nokia 7900, a mobile phone model
- Radeon HD 7900 series, a line of graphics processing units from AMD released 2011
- Radeon RX 7900 series, a line of graphics processing units from AMD released 2022

== Transportation ==
- PCC 7900, a streetcar type
- Volvo 7900, a model of rigid and articulated buses
