= Prism =

Prism usually refers to:

- Prism (optics), a transparent optical component with flat surfaces that refract light
- Prism (geometry), a kind of polyhedron

Prism may also refer to:

== Science and mathematics ==
- Prism (geology), a type of sedimentary deposit
- Prism (surveying), a type of target
- Prism correction, a component of some eyeglass prescriptions

== Government ==
- PRISM, a surveillance program run by the US National Security Agency
- Oregon Performance Reporting Information System, a state agency

== Media and entertainment ==
=== Publications ===
- Prism (character), a Marvel Comics character
- Prism International, a Canadian literary magazine
- PRISM: The Journal of Complex Operations, published by the National Defense University
- ASEE Prism, the flagship publication of the American Society for Engineering Education
- Prism Comics, an organization that supports LGBT people in the comics industry
- The Prism Pentad, a series of Dungeons & Dragons novels by Troy Denning
- Prism, a monthly on the post-Soviet states by the Jamestown Foundation

=== Music ===
- Prism (band), a Canadian rock band
  - Prism (Prism album), the debut album of the Canadian band
- Prism (Japanese band), a jazz fusion band
- Prism (Beth Nielsen Chapman album)
- Prism (Dave Holland album)
- Prism (Jeff Scott Soto album)
- Prism (Joanne Brackeen album)
- Prism (Katy Perry album)
- Prism (Matthew Shipp album)
- Prism (Ryo Kawasaki album)
- Prism (The Orb album)
- Prism (Yoshida Brothers album)
- Prism (Rainbow EP)
- "Prism", a song from Lindsey Stirling's 2016 album Brave Enough
- Prism Records, an American record label

=== Other ===
- Prism (play), a 2017 play by Terry Johnson
- Prism (opera), a 2018 opera by Ellen Reid
- PRISM (TV network), a defunct cable television channel in Philadelphia, United States
- Prism (street artist), street artist from Melbourne, Australia
- Prism Leisure Corporation, a distribution and publishing company in the United Kingdom
- Prism, a character in the episodic videogame Dispatch

== Computing ==
- Publishing Requirements for Industry Standard Metadata, XML metadata vocabularies for syndicating, aggregating, post-processing and multi-purposing content

=== Hardware ===
- Prism (chipset), a wireless networking chipset
- Apollo PRISM, a microprocessor made by Apollo Computer
- DEC PRISM, a cancelled processor architecture designed by Digital Equipment Corporation
- SGI Prism, a computer
- Prism Microproducts, a British IT company that produced modems for the Micronet 800 service
- PR/SM, an IBM mainframe hypervisor

=== Software ===
- Delphi Prism, a software development environment for .NET and Mono
- Mozilla Prism, a software product for desktop integration of web applications
- PRISM model checker, a probabilistic model checker
- GraphPad Prism, software for scientific graphing, biostatistics and curve fitting

== Other uses ==
- PRISM (reactor), a small nuclear power plant design
- A retroreflector, used in surveying
- Prism Rail, a British passenger rail company
- Prism Motorsports, a defunct NASCAR team
- Nokia Prism, a fashion mobile phone collection
- Prism (video game), a video game about manipulating 3D shapes
- PRISM Live Studio, a video simulcasting program from the South Korean web services company Naver.

== See also ==
- Prismatic (disambiguation)
- Prizm (disambiguation)
- PrSM, short for Precision Strike Missile
