= Nokia 7370 =

Mobile phone model

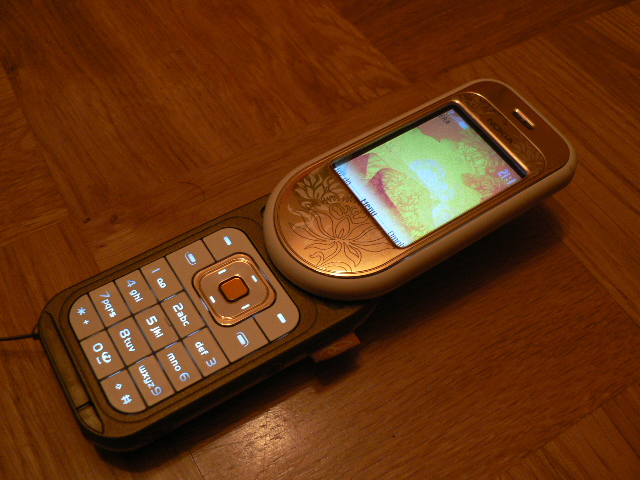
- Manufacturer: Nokia
- Availability by region: Q1 2006
- Successor: Nokia 7230
- Related: Nokia 7360; Nokia 7373; Nokia 7380; Nokia 7390; Nokia 7280

The Nokia 7370 is a mobile phone made by Nokia, announced in October 2005. It was part of the company's fashion-focused L'Amour Collection and came in two colours: Coffee Brown and Warm Amber. The Nokia 7370 has leather and metallic components and is a "swivel" design that reveals a hidden keypad.

A slightly improved model called Nokia 7373 was released in September 2006 with a 2-megapixel camera rather than 1.3-megapixel, and support for MicroSD up to 2GB.

== Specification sheet ==
Feature	Specification
Form factor	Slider
Colors	Coffee brown, Warm amber
Operating System	Nokia OS
Screen	TFT, 256K colors 240 x 320 pixels, 2.0 inches, 30 x 40, 180-degree rotator design
Size	88 x 43 x 23 mm, 73 cc
Weight	104 g
Internal Dynamic Memory	8 MB
Camera	2.0-megapixel camera (1600 x 1200) with flash, 8X digital zoom
Photo Formats	JPEG, GIF, Exif, WBMP, BMP, MBM, PNG
Video Recording	QCIF
Video Formats	3GP
Video Player/editor	Yes/Yes
Data cable support	CA-53, USB 2.0 via Pop-port
PG.R.S. support	No
Bluetooth	Yes
Email	Yes
Radio	Yes, Stereo FM radio (wired headphones or hands-free required)
Games	Phantom Spider Evolution
Polyphonic tones	64 chords
Ringtones	MP3/AAC
Offline mode	Yes
Battery	Li-ion 700 mAh BL-4B
Talk time	Up to 3 h
Standby time	Up to 220 h
