= Nokia Prism =

Fashion mobile phone collection

The Nokia Prism is a fashion mobile phone collection produced by Nokia. All models run S40 5th Edition user interface.

As for 2008, the collection includes the four handsets:

- Nokia 7070 Prism (low-end phone, released 4Q 2008)
- Nokia 7500 Prism (mid-range triband phone, released 3Q 2007)
- Nokia 7900 Prism (hi-end quadband phone, released 3Q 2007)
- Nokia 7900 Crystal Prism (luxury version of Nokia 7900 Prism, released 4Q 2007)
