= Prizm =

Prizm may refer to:

- Casio Prizm, a series of graphing calculators
- Claritas Prizm, a marketing database used in the United States
- Geo Prizm or Chevrolet Prizm, a car by General Motors
- Prizm Outlets, a shopping center in Nevada, US
- Prizm Project, a human rights education program for young women
- FDB Prizm, a medical device database maintained by First Databank
- Probing Radio Intensity at high-Z from Marion, a radio astronomy experiment run by the South African National Antarctic Programme

== See also ==
- Prism (disambiguation)
