= 7500 =

7500 may refer to:

- The year 7500, in the 8th millennium
- ATI Radeon 7500, a computer graphics card series
- NVIDIA GeForce 7500, a computer graphics card series
- Nokia 7500, a mobile phone released in 2007
- Emergency Aviation Transponder code, indicating a possible hijacking
- Flight 7500, a 2014 horror film
- 7500 (film), a 2019 action thriller film
