= Nokia 7360 =

Mobile phone model

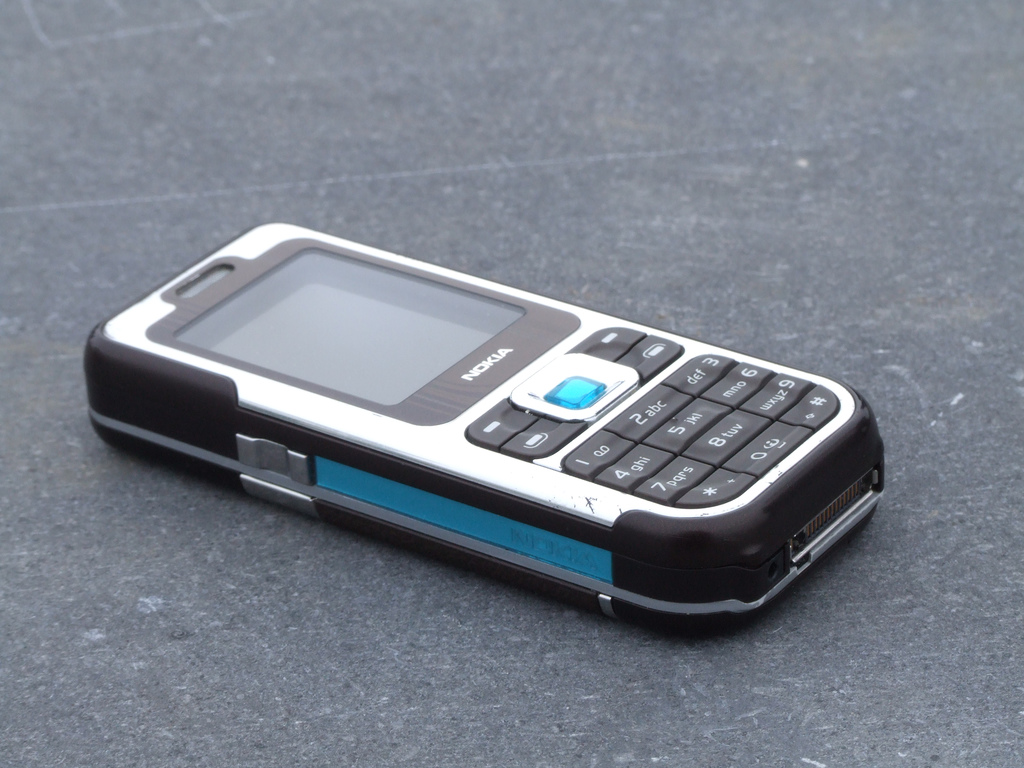
- Manufacturer: Nokia
- Availability by region: October 2005
- Predecessor: Nokia 7260
- Successor: Nokia 7500 Prism; Nokia 7900 Prism; Nokia 7900 Crystal Prism
- Related: Nokia 7370; Nokia 7373; Nokia 7380; Nokia 7390
- Form factor: candybar
- Dimensions: 105×45×18 mm (4.13×1.77×0.71 in)
- Weight: 92 g (3 oz)
- Rear camera: VGA Optics

Nokia 7360 fashion cell phone was announced on 28 September 2005, as part of the "L'Amour Collection", along with the 7370, 7373, 7380 and the 7390.

== Specification sheet ==
Feature	Specification
Form factor	Candybar
Colors	Pink, yellow, brown, black
Operating System	Nokia OS
Screen	160x128 pixels
Size	105 x 45 x 18mm
Internal Dynamic Memory	4 MB
Camera	VGA 640x480 pixels
Video Recording	Yes
Video Formats	3GP
Infrared	Yes
Data cable support	Yes, USB 2.0 via Pop-port
GPRS support	Yes
Email	Yes
Radio	Yes, Stereo FM radio (wired headphones or hands-free required)
Video Player/editor	Yes/No
Polyphonic tones	Yes, 24 chords
Offline mode	No
Battery	BL-5B (850 mAh)
Talk time	up to 4,5 h (GSM)
Standby time	up to 415 hours

== Images ==
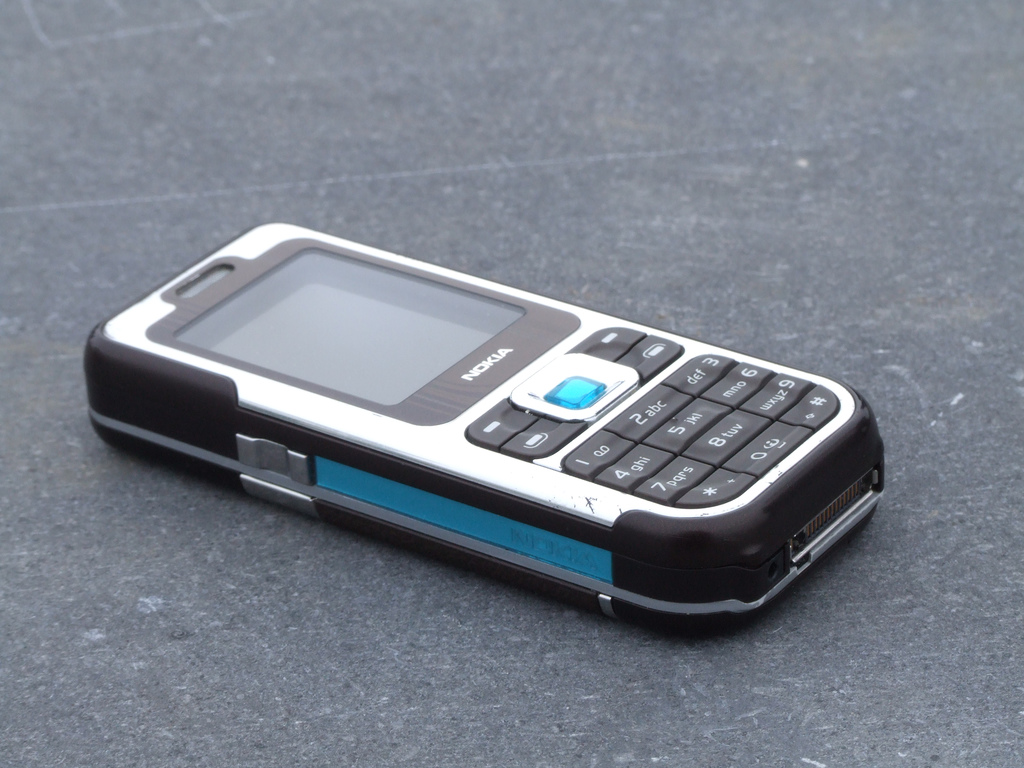
Nokia 7360

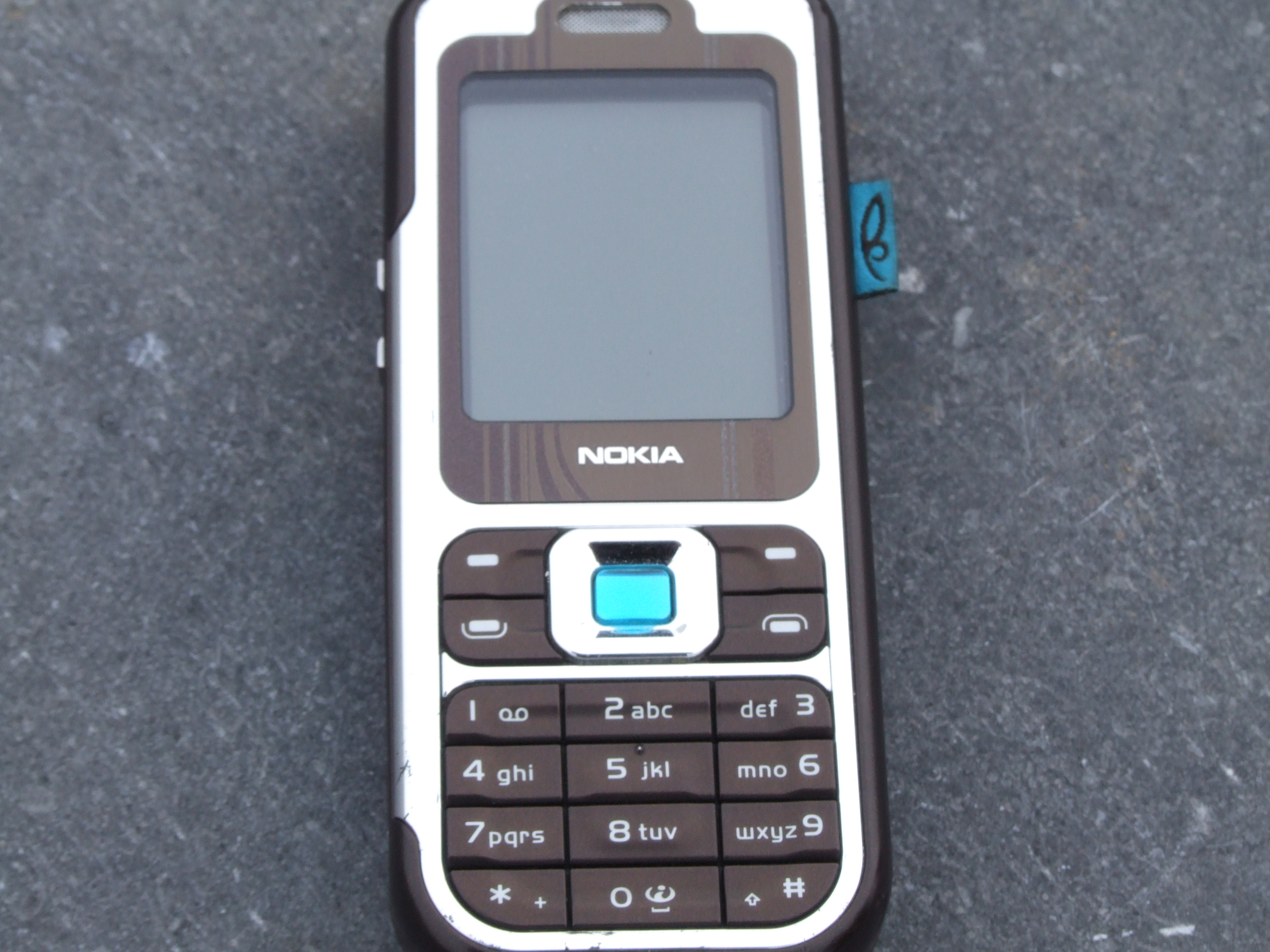
Nokia 7360
