= Nokia 7380 =

Mobile phone

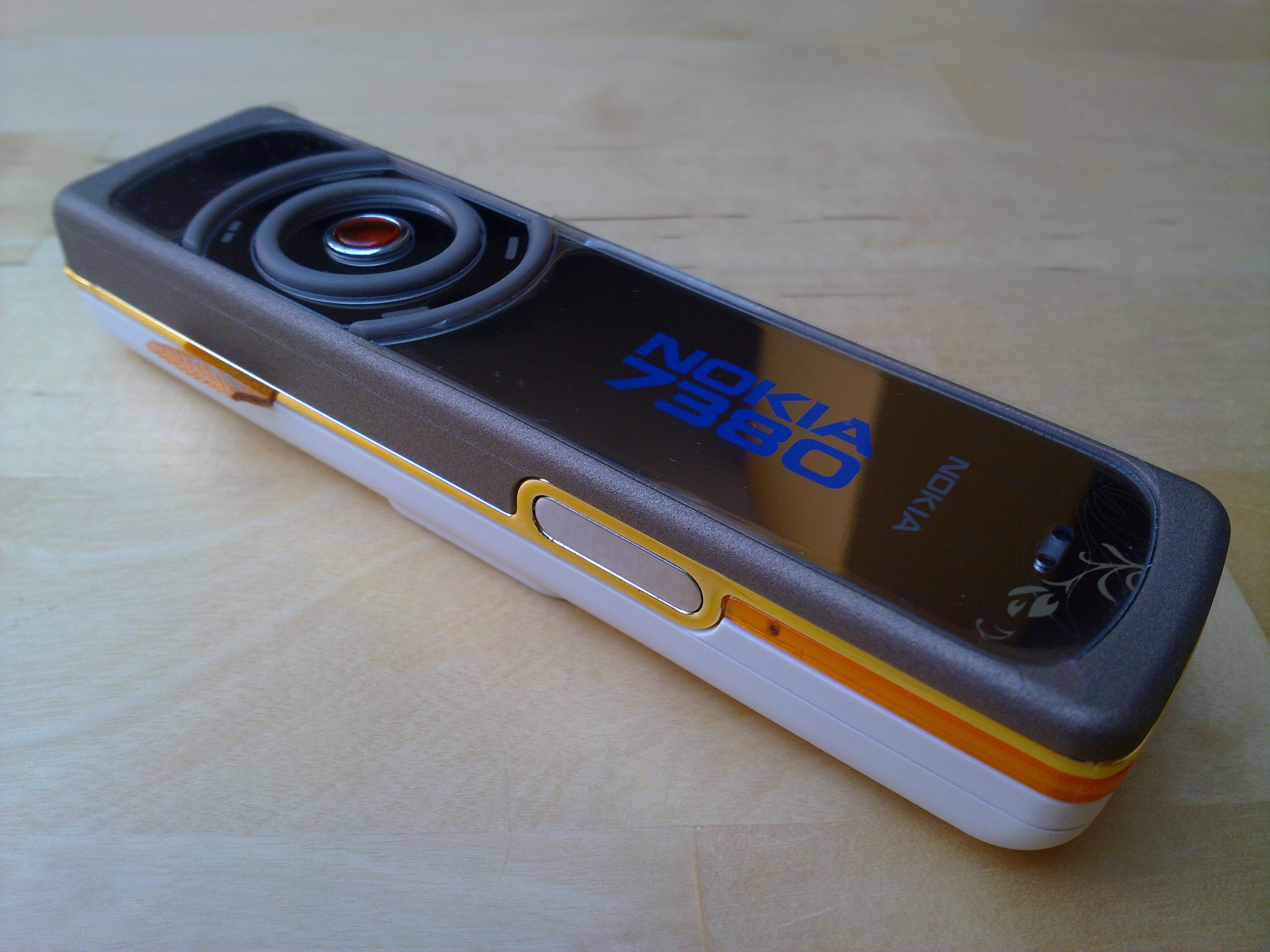
A Nokia 7380.

The Nokia 7380 fashion phone was released in 2005, as part of the "L'Amour Collection", along with the 7360, 7370, 7373 and 7390. The 7380 was designed at Nokia's Design Center in California, led by Miki Mehandjiysky. What distinguishes this phone from others is its sensory navigation key which differs greatly from a conventional keypad and functions similarly to the touch-sensitive navigation wheel of the iPod. The display of the phone is another point of interest, measuring approximately 1.5 cm by 3 cm. The screen also becomes highly reflective in power saving mode, so it can double as a mirror. Some reviewers cited the reflective surfaces made it difficult to see and operate the phone effectively.

The Nokia 7380 has a 2-megapixel camera, up to 52 MB built-in memory (non-expandable), FM radio and Bluetooth and sports Pop-Port connectivity.

It is also an improvement of the Nokia 7280. The phone debuted at Nieman Marcus retailers.

The "L'Amour Collection" was awarded the 2006 IDEA Award (Silver) by the Industrial Designers Society of America (IDSA).
