= Las Vegas Premium Outlets North =

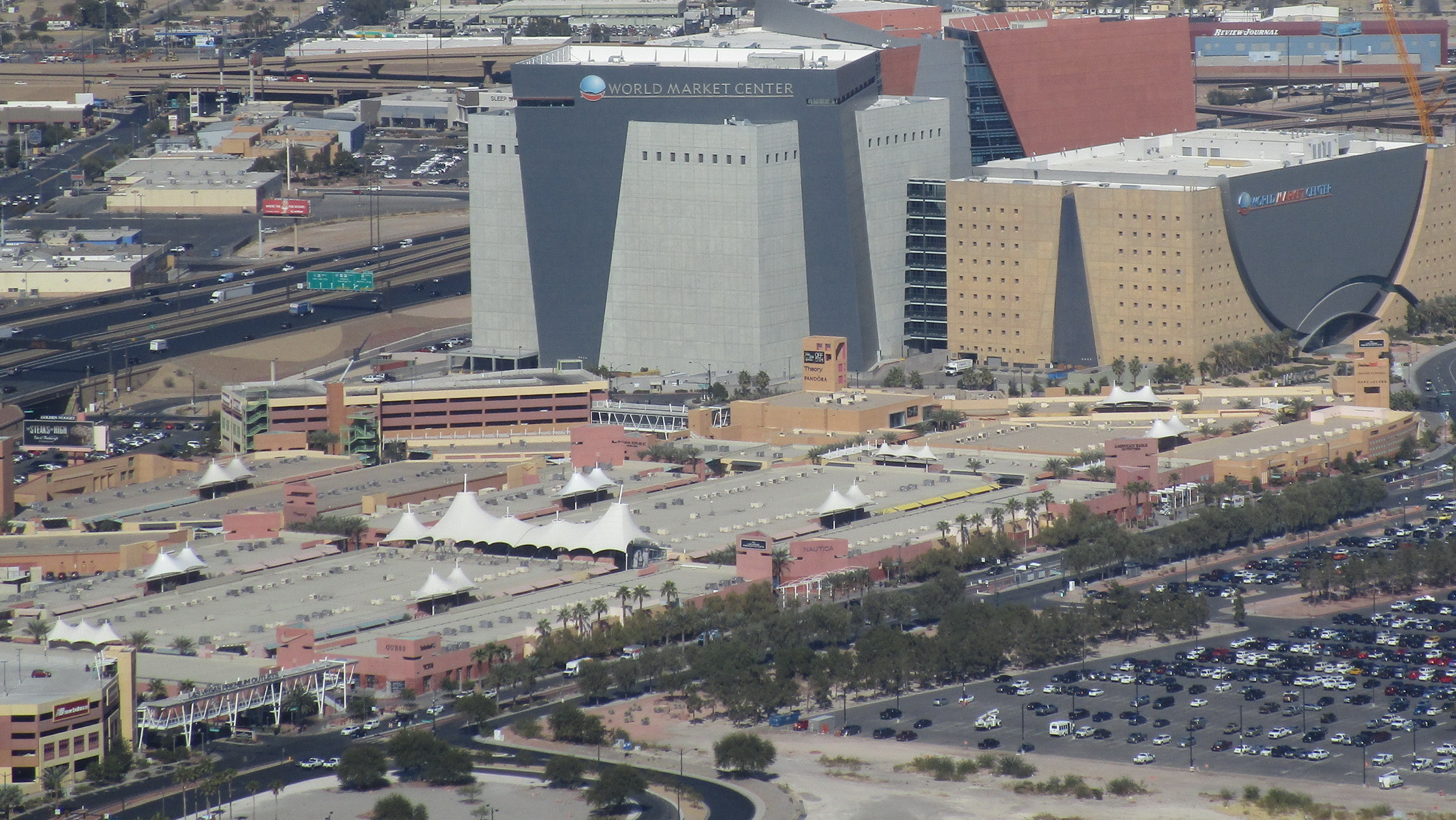
- Aerial view of Las Vegas Premium Outlets, seen south of the World Market Center
- Location: Las Vegas, Nevada, U.S.
- Coordinates: 36°9′50″N 115°9′29″W
- Address: 875 S Grand Central Parkway
- Opened: August 1, 2003; 23 years ago
- Developer: Chelsea Property Group; Simon Property Group
- Manager: Simon Premium Outlets
- Owner: Simon Property Group
- Num. of stores: 175
- Floor area: 685,000 sq ft (63,600 m^{2})
- Floors: 1
- Website: www.premiumoutlets.com/outlet/las-vegas-north

Las Vegas Premium Outlets North is an outlet mall located on 40 acres (16 ha) in downtown Las Vegas, Nevada, United States, north of the Las Vegas Strip. It is an outdoor mall with 685,000-square-foot (63,600 m^{2}). It is owned and managed by Simon Property Group, and is part of Simon's Premium Outlets chain. It was co-developed with Chelsea Property Group, and was opened on August 1, 2003. Expansions were finished in 2008 and 2015, adding additional retailers and parking spaces.

It was the second outlet mall to open in the Las Vegas Valley, joining a Belz Factory Outlet World location which opened south of the Strip in 1993. The latter was purchased in 2003 by Chelsea, which has since merged with Simon. The "North" name was appended to Las Vegas Premium Outlets in 2011, after the older outlet mall was renamed Las Vegas Premium Outlets South.

== History ==
Mayor Oscar Goodman had advocated for redevelopment in downtown Las Vegas since taking office in 1999. The Las Vegas Premium Outlets mall was announced in 2001, and was developed by Chelsea Property Group, in partnership with Simon Property Group. Construction began on July 2, 2002, on 40 acres. The project was built by Jacobsen Construction of Salt Lake City and Hardin Construction Group Inc. of Atlanta. The mall is part of a chain of Premium Outlets locations, and was modeled after the Orlando Premium Outlets, also developed by Chelsea and Simon.

Las Vegas Premium Outlets had a soft opening on August 1, 2003, followed by the official opening one week later. It was the second outlet mall to open in the Las Vegas Valley, and would employ approximately 800 people. Goodman praised the mall, calling it "the spark that is going to reignite development in downtown Las Vegas". It was developed at a cost of $95 million, and was operated by Chelsea, which was merged into Simon Property Group in 2004. Las Vegas Premium Outlets was targeted at local residents as well as tourists. The mall was well received, although an inadequate number of parking spaces would become a frequent issue. The mall opened with 1,374 parking spaces, more than legally required, although this was not enough to keep up with demand.

The mall's location beside Interstate 15 helped its success, as did free shuttle service from nearby casino properties. Expansion plans were unveiled in 2006, removing part of the parking lot in order to add two parking garages, as well as additional retailers. The mall received financing from the Las Vegas Redevelopment Agency to fund the project. The $56 million, 104,000 sq ft (9,700 m^{2}) expansion was completed in 2008.

In 2003, Simon and Chelsea had sold four acres of land to local developer Mark Fine. The property is located at the southwest corner of Bonneville Avenue and Grand Central Parkway, at the north end of Premium Outlets. Fine planned to build a mixed-use project on the site, but his plans failed to materialize. In 2012, the two companies bought back the land for another expansion of the mall that would include more retailers and an addition to one of the parking garages. Construction on the expansion began in May 2013, and was finished two years later. It included 782 additional parking spaces.

== Tenants ==
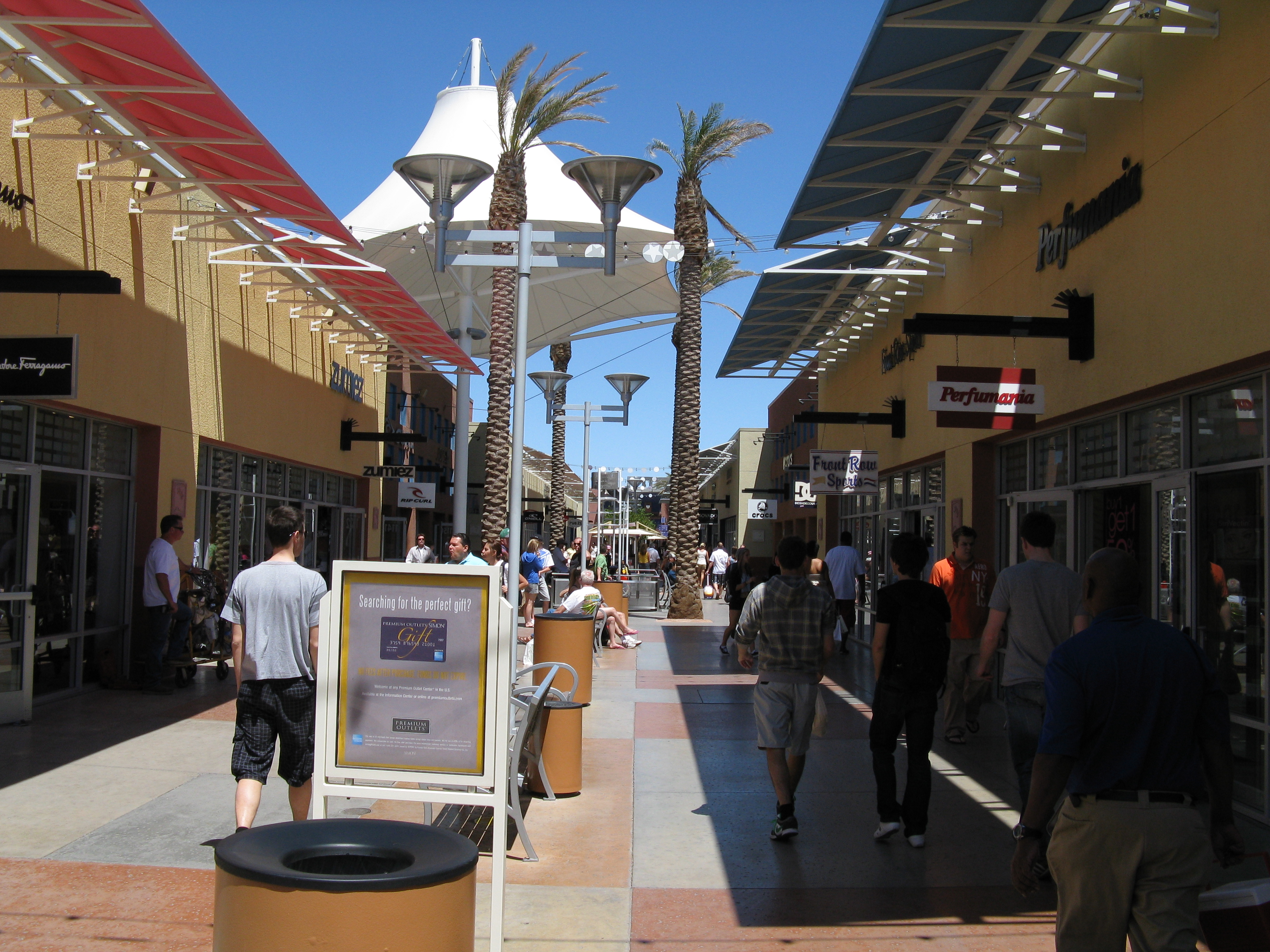
Shops at Las Vegas Premium Outlets North

Las Vegas Premium Outlets debuted with 435,000 sq ft (40,400 m^{2}), and included 125 stores, most of which were ready on opening day. The mall also opened with a central food court featuring indoor and outdoor seating for up to 450 people. Las Vegas Premium Outlets focused primarily on high-end retailers upon opening. Notable tenants included Armani Exchange, Dolce & Gabbana, Casual Corner, Nike, and Quiksilver.

The 2008 expansion brought the total number of retailers to 150. Approximately 30 new tenants were added in the 2015 expansion, for a total of 175. Among the new tenants was The Cheesecake Factory, as well as Saks Fifth Avenue Off 5th. The expansion brought the mall to 685,000 sq ft (63,600 m^{2}). A Shake Shack restaurant was added in 2018.

== South location ==
A sister property, Las Vegas Premium Outlets South, is located at the southeast corner of Warm Springs Road and Las Vegas Boulevard, south of the Las Vegas Strip. It is an indoor outlet mall with 140 stores. It originally operated as Belz Factory Outlet World. It was announced in 1991, by Belz Enterprises, and was part of a chain of Factory Outlet World locations. Construction was underway in March 1992, and the mall opened on November 19, 1993, targeting both local residents and tourists. A major expansion was underway in 1996, adding 39 additional retailers in a new connecting structure located south of the original. The expansion continued into 1997, and included the addition of a second food court, and a carousel.

The mall was a filming location for the 2001 film The Mexican.

In August 2003, Chelsea Property Group purchased the Belz mall for $104 million. Belz Factory Outlet World was renamed the Las Vegas Outlet Center. Up to that point, it had been one of the most profitable outlet centers in the U.S. A nine-month renovation and expansion project began in 2010, with the mall renamed Las Vegas Premium Outlets South the following year. The project turned the mall into an upscale sister property to the original Premium Outlets in downtown.
