= Prizm Outlets =

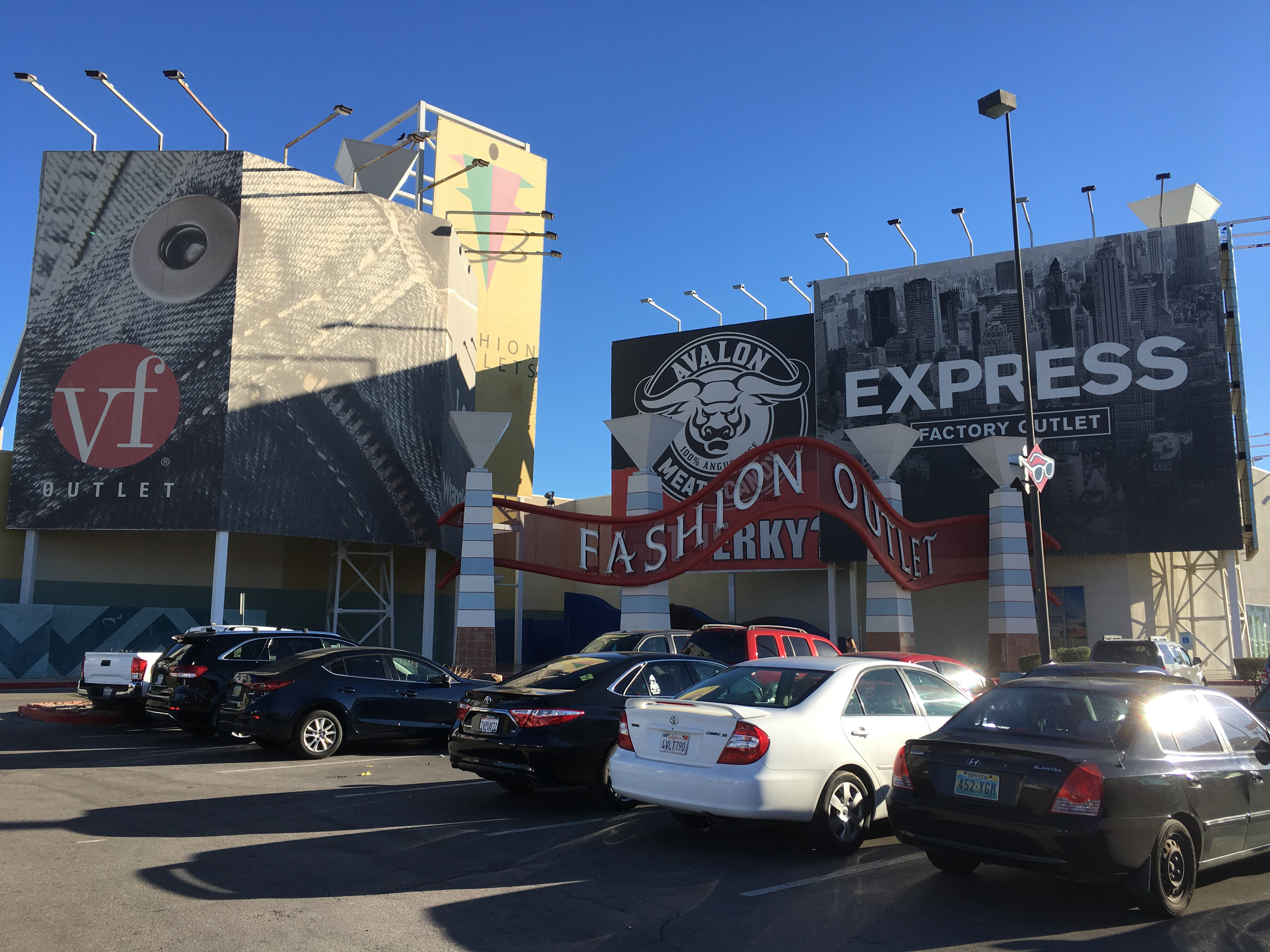
- Mall entrance in 2018
- Location: Primm, Nevada, U.S.
- Coordinates: 35.60779°N 115.38807°W
- Address: 32100 South Las Vegas Boulevard
- Opened: July 16, 1998; 28 years ago
- Closed: C. 2025 (indoor only)
- Developer: TrizecHahn & Gordon Group
- Owner: Kohan Retail Investment Group
- Num. of stores: 100 (at peak); 1 as of July 2025
- Floor area: 371,000 sq ft (34,500 m^{2})
- Website: prizmoutlets.com

Prizm Outlets, formerly the Fashion Outlets of Las Vegas, was a 371,000-square-foot (34,500 m^{2}) outlet shopping center in Primm, Nevada, located just off Interstate 15 at the California state line, approximately 40 miles (64 km) southwest of Las Vegas. It is owned by Rialto Capital Management, on land leased from the Primm family. It is connected to the Primm Valley Resort.

The Fashion Outlets of Las Vegas opened on July 16, 1998, with approximately 100 retailers. Tenant occupancy and sales decreased during the 2010s, due to competition from Las Vegas Premium Outlets as well as online retailers. By 2020, it was rebranded Prizm Outlets. It had approximately five stores as of 2022, dwindling to one as of July 2025.

== History ==
Plans for the mall were announced in September 1995. Construction began in May 1997. It began as a joint project between two shopping center developers, the Gordon Group and TrizecHahn. The Fashion Outlets of Las Vegas opened on July 16, 1998, at a cost of $75 million. The mall is connected to the Primm Valley Resort, and was built to attract motorists along Interstate 15, traveling between Las Vegas and California. Its location in Primm was chosen so outlet store tenants could avoid competing with their higher-end stores in Las Vegas. The mall employed 1,000 people.

Upon opening, it included approximately 100 retailers, and a food court with 10 restaurants. The single-level mall, designed by MCG Architecture of Beverly Hills, is divided into two themed courts: one resembling New York City and the other modeled in the style of Miami Art Deco.

After opening, some tenants complained of poor sales and subsequently closed, prompting lawsuits from the mall. Other tenants reported strong sales. Nevertheless, the Fashion Outlets of Las Vegas received only 1.5 million visitors in its first year, far below expectations; TrizecHahn had estimated 10–12 million. In 1999, the mall launched a new marketing campaign to boost attendance among Southern Nevada residents. An existing shuttle bus service between Las Vegas and the mall was also increased.

In 2001, it was among the top-five outlet centers in the U.S., based on sales per square foot. Another new marketing campaign was launched later that year. It included television and radio advertisements, as well as billboards targeting motorists along Interstate 15. Profits increased further after the September 11 attacks, which had resulted in less air travel and more motorists.

Prior to the mall's opening, TrizecHahn had agreed to sell its interests to The Rouse Company, but the sale did not materialize. Talisman Cos., a Florida-based real estate developer focused on turning around underperforming shopping centers, acquired a stake in the property in 2000, and by the following year, was reported to be seeking full ownership.

Talisman announced in 2007 that it had obtained a $141 million loan to finance an expansion of the mall from 371,000 square feet (34,500 m^{2}) to 521,000 square feet (48,400 m^{2}). At the time, tourists accounted for more than 80 percent of its clientele. In 2012, the mall took out a $73-million mortgage, along with a $32-million loan from Brookfield Asset Management. Brookfield foreclosed in 2016, taking ownership of the mall. Tenant occupancy had seen a decrease, and sales were also reduced because of competition from Las Vegas Premium Outlets as well as online retailers. By late 2017, the mall's mortgage was reportedly in default. The mortgage holder, Miami-based real estate firm Rialto Capital Management, repossessed the property in 2018.

By December 2019, more than $2 million had been spent on upgrades for the mall. This included interior artwork by more than 30 muralists and street artists from around the world. Rialto changed the mall's name to Prizm Outlets and sought a younger demographic. Christopher Julian, a design architect who oversaw the rebranding, said, "We wanted to turn it into an evolution of the word Primm … and introduce that concept to Generation Z, so we put the 'z,' which is Prizm." The mall was approximately 66-percent occupied as of early 2020. Prizm Outlets lost 95 percent of its value during the final six months of the year, amid the COVID-19 lockdowns. In 2021, the outlets at auction was purchased by the Kohan Retail Investment Group for $1.525 million. The loan on the mall suffered a loss of 120% or $74 million. Only around a handful of stores remained open as of 2022, with the food court entirely shuttered. A year later, the only remaining tenants were Bath & Body Works and Michael Kors. A single tenant, a Sanithrift outlet, remains in operation as of July 2025, with the rest of the mall interior no longer open to the public.

== Gallery ==
Various areas of the mall in June 2022.

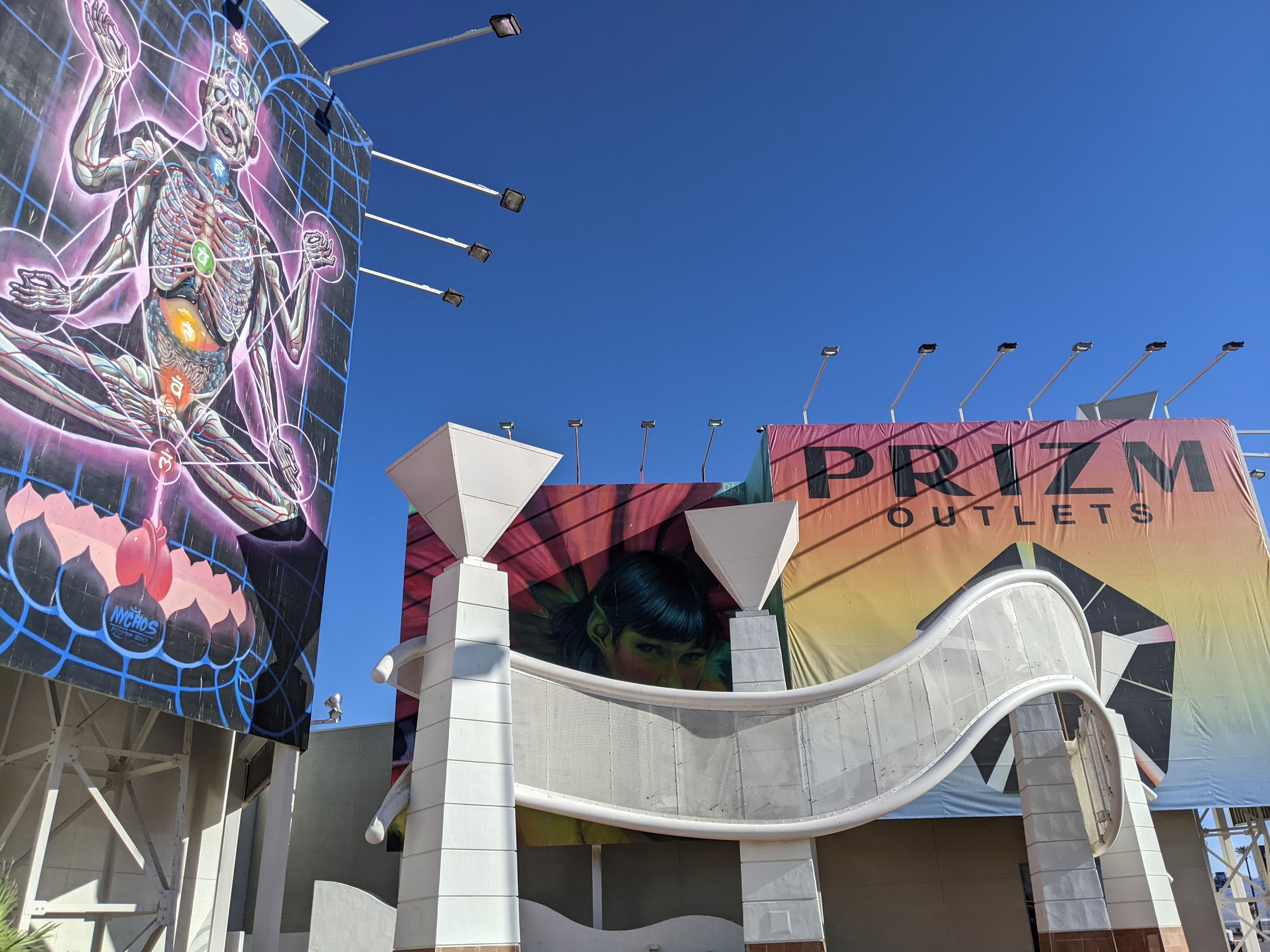

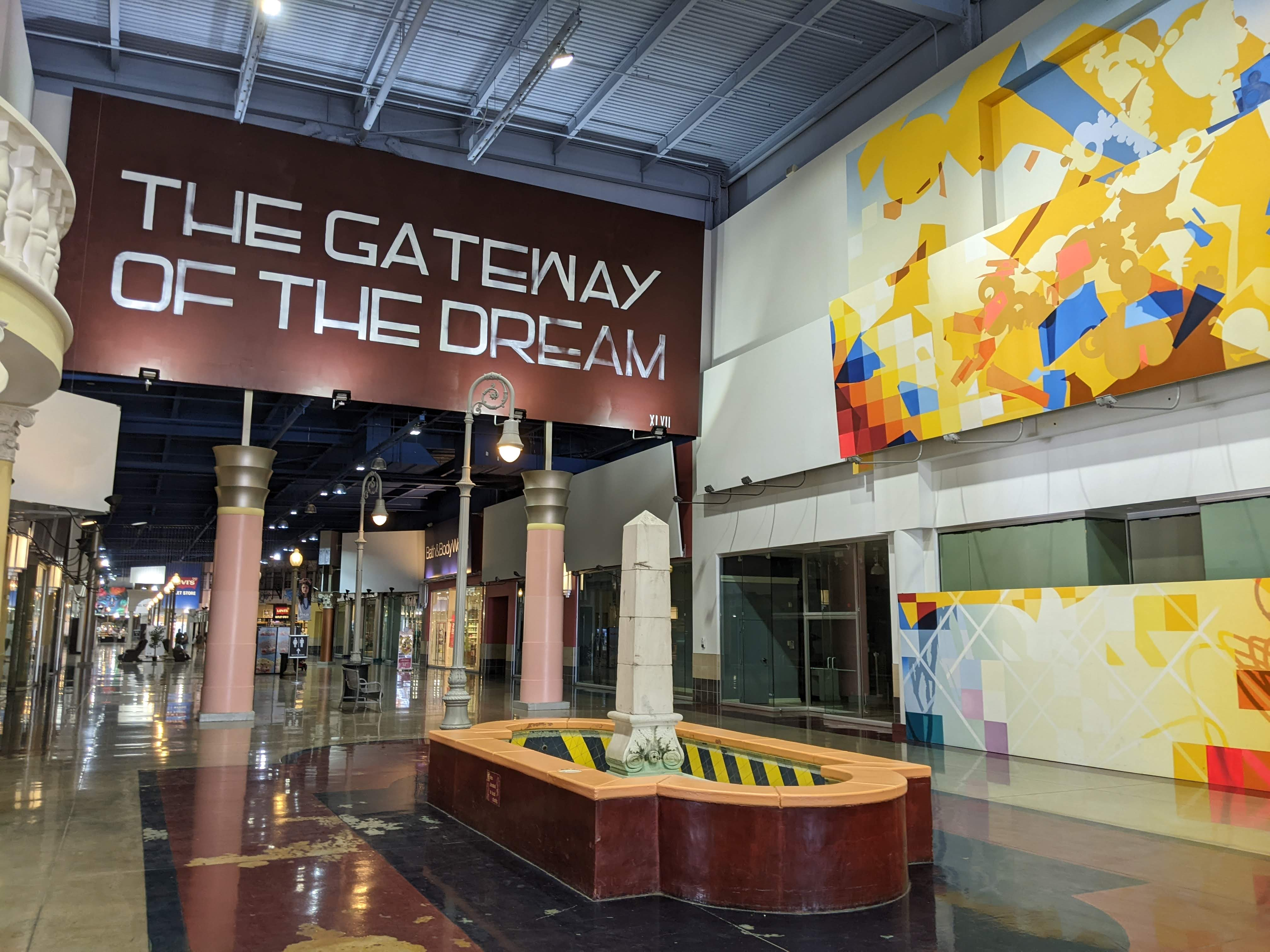

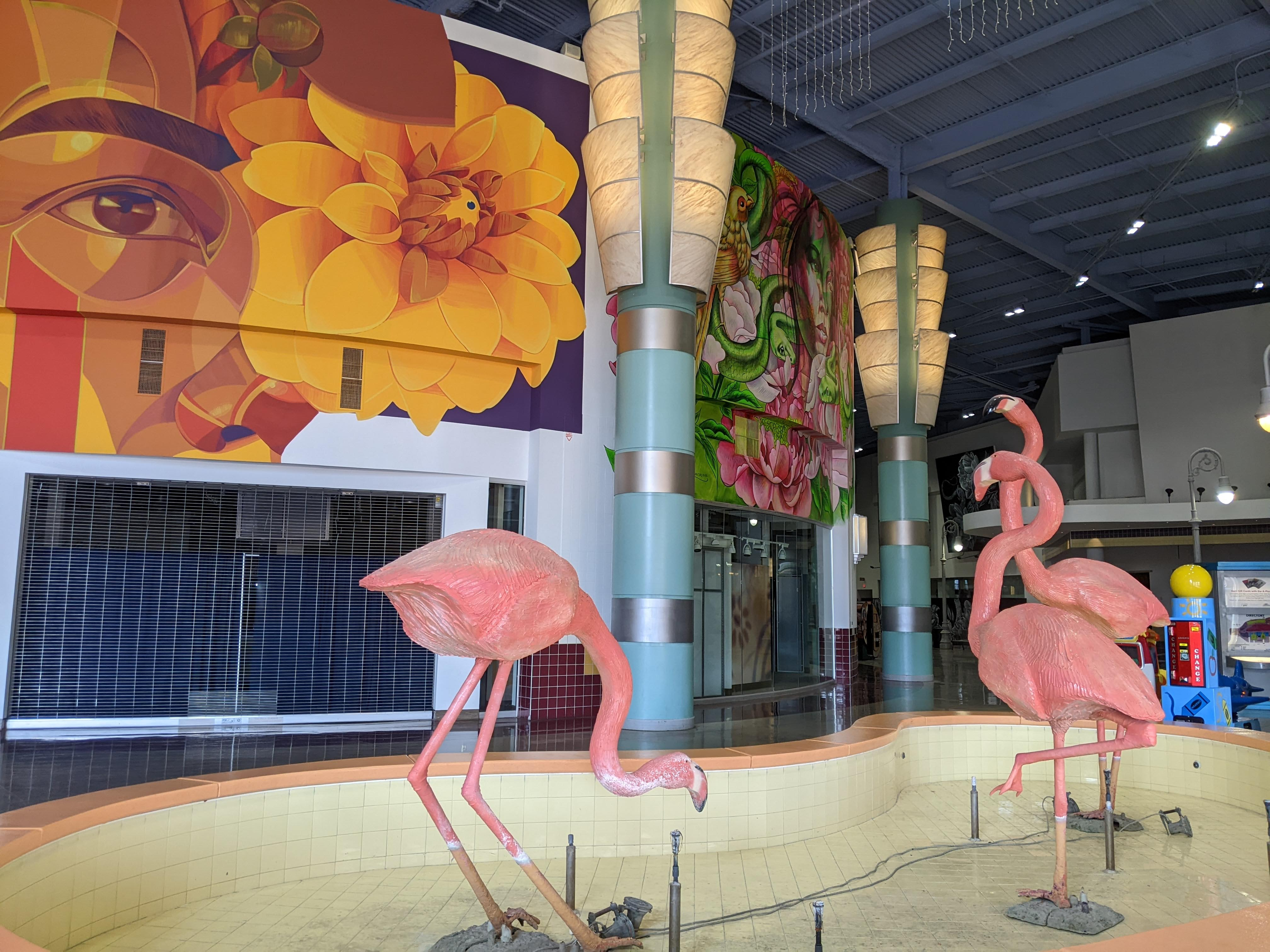

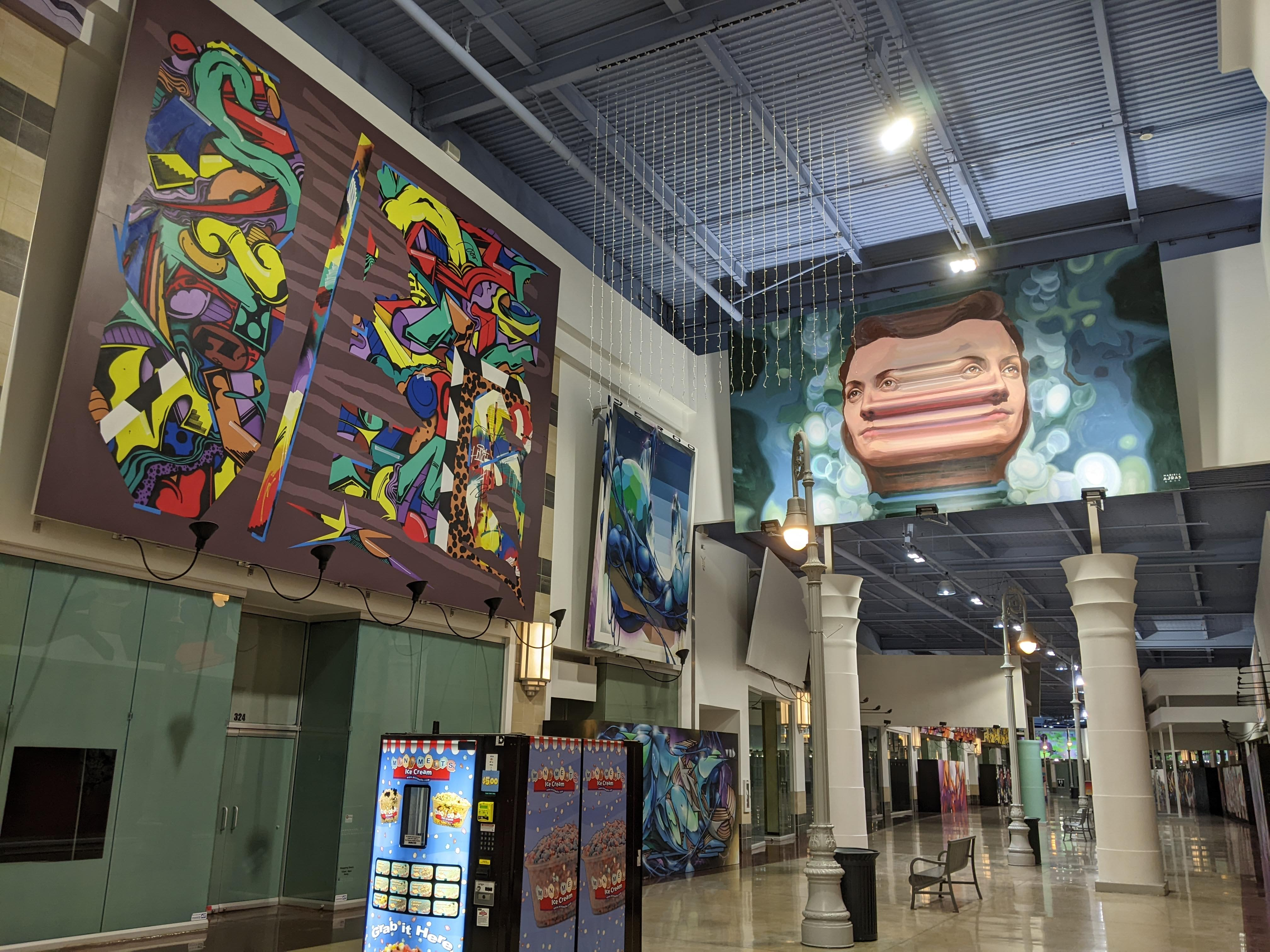

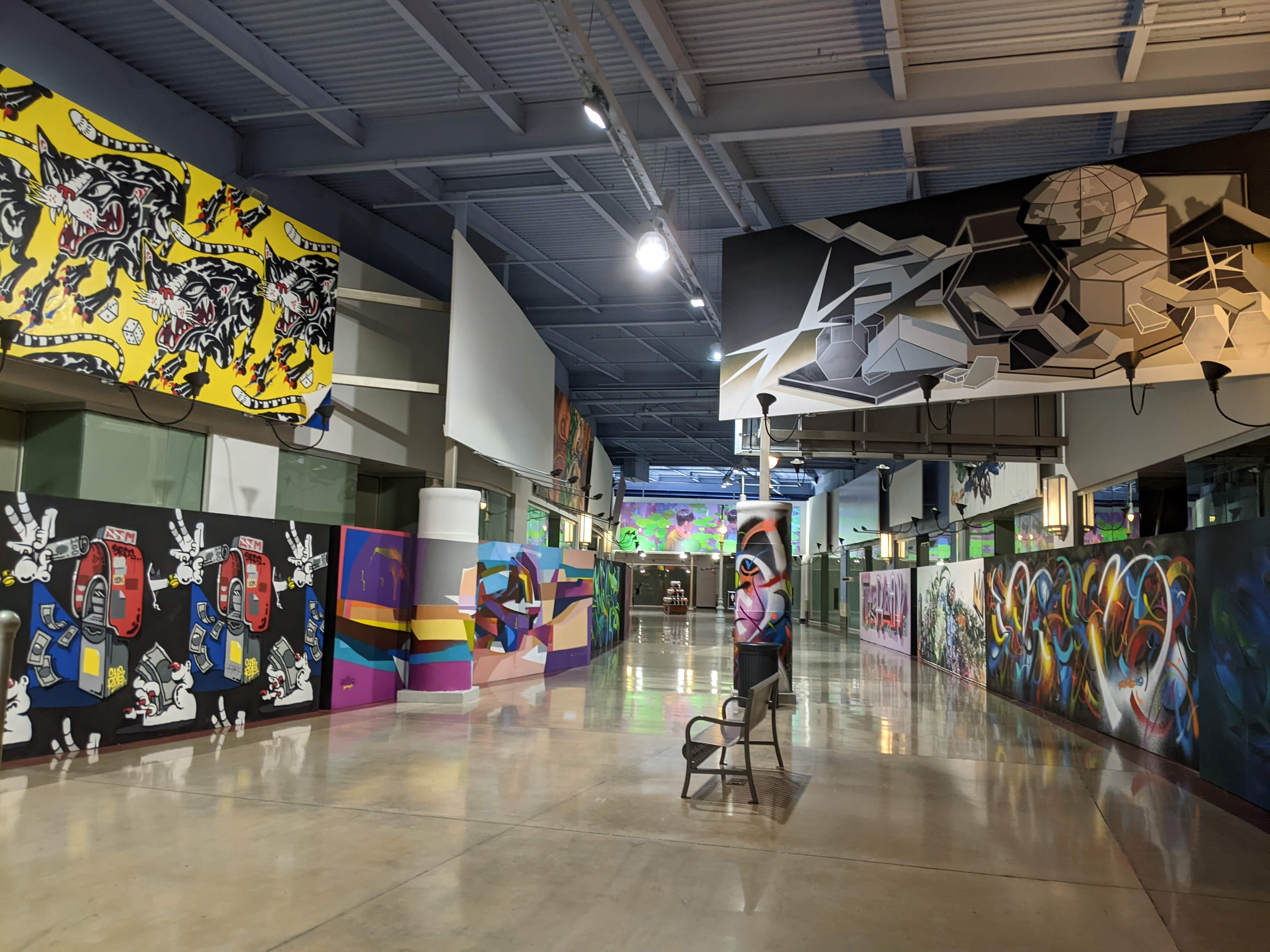

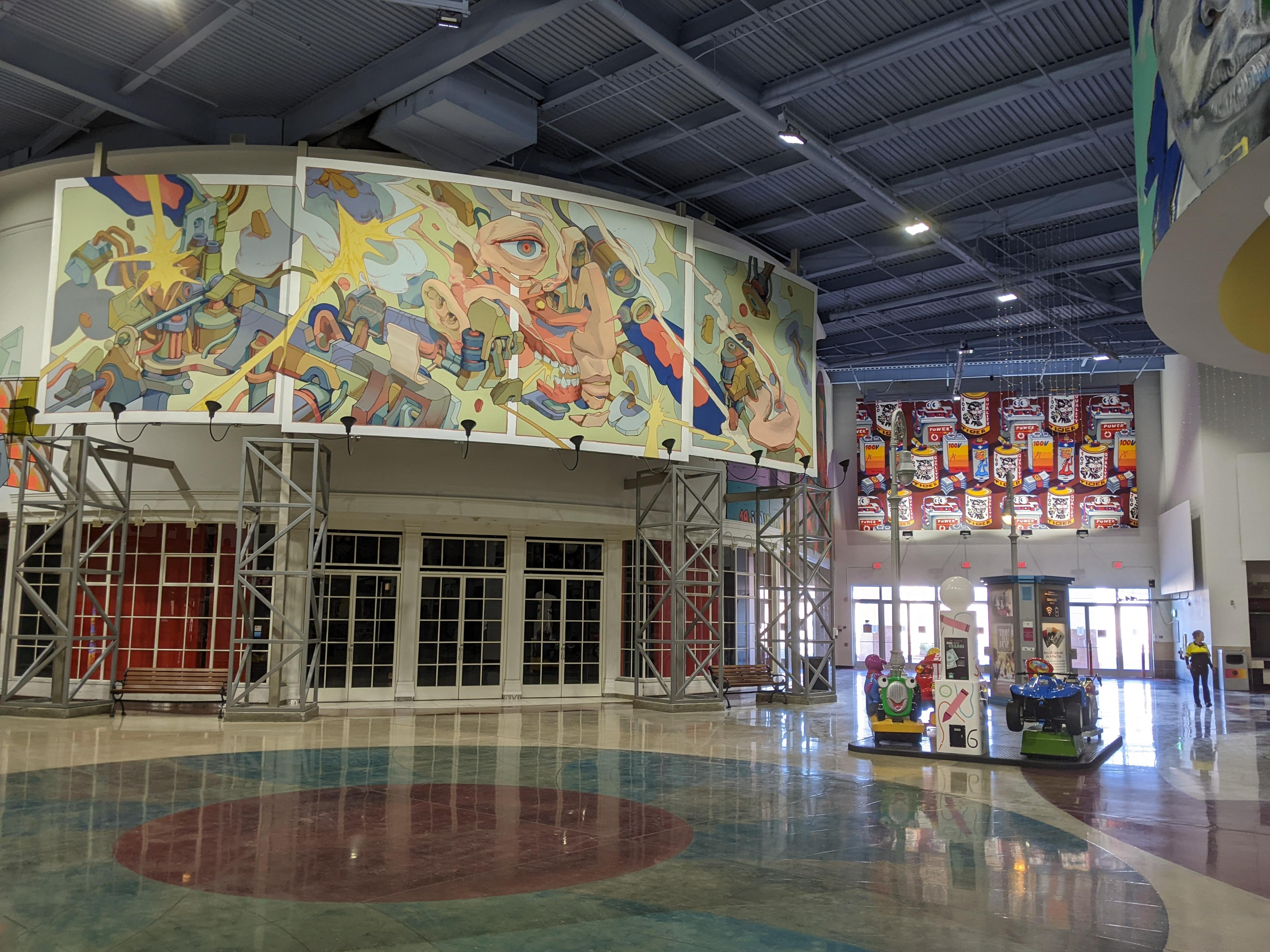
