= Prismatic (disambiguation) =

Prismatic describes the properties of an optical prism.

Prismatic may also refer to:

- Prismatic (app), a social news curation and discovery app
- Prismatic joint, a joint that provides a linear sliding movement between two bodies
- Prismatic surface
- The Prismatic World Tour, concert tour by singer Katy Perry
