= Nokia 7390 =

Mobile phone

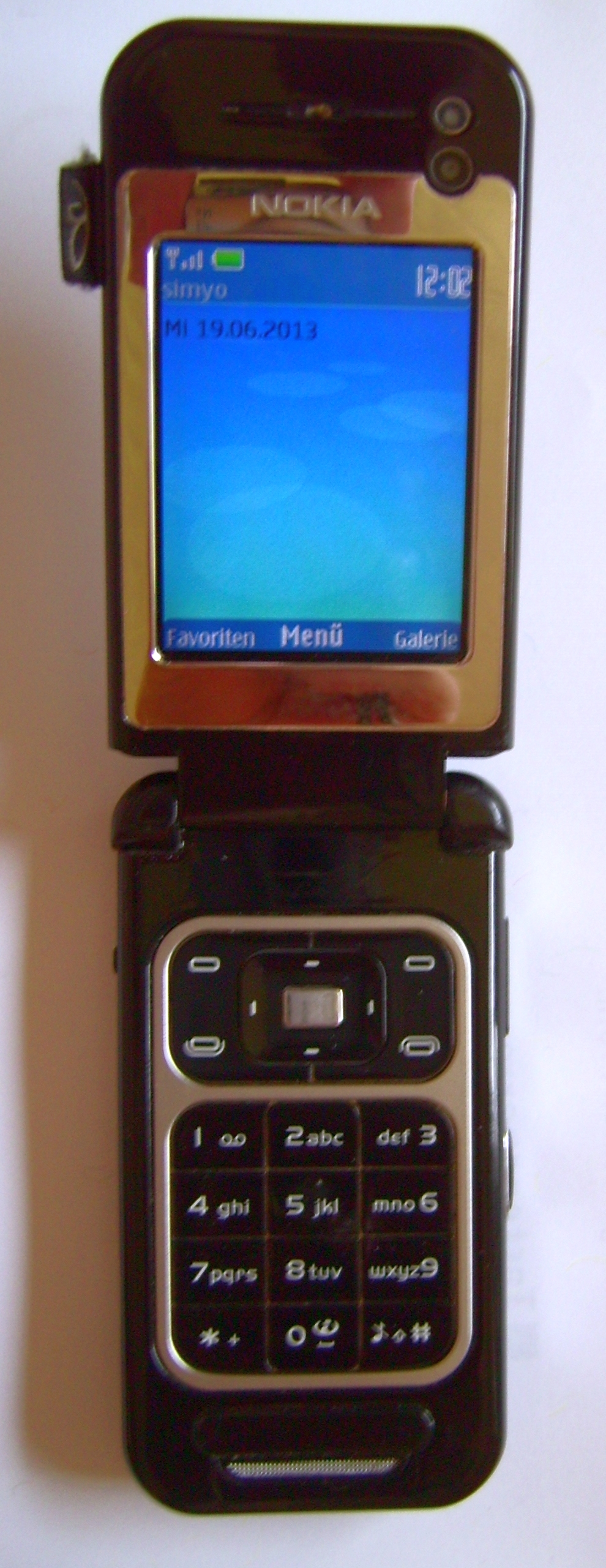
- Manufacturer: Nokia
- Predecessor: Nokia 7270
- Successor: Nokia N76; Nokia 7376; Nokia 7510 Supernova
- Related: Nokia 7360; Nokia 7370; Nokia 7373; Nokia 7380
- Compatible networks: WCDMA, GSM / GPRS / Tri-Band (900/1800/1900)
- Form factor: Clamshell
- Dimensions: 90×47×19 mm (3.54×1.85×0.75 in) (L * W * D)
- Weight: 115 g (4 oz)
- Removable storage: MicroSD max 2 GB
- Rear camera: 3.15 megapixel
- Front camera: Video call (Front)
- Display: 2.3"; 16M color 320x240 (174ppi) internal display and 262K color TFT 160x128 external display
- Connectivity: Bluetooth 2.0

The Nokia 7390 is a mobile phone featuring the Series 40 interface from the L'Amour Collection. It was announced in September 2006 and released in December 2006. It is the first 3G-capable fashion phone from Nokia. One of the useful features of the phone is the ability to play music or take pictures without opening it. The camera's maximum resolution is at 3 megapixels. The on-board music player can play MP3, AAC, eAAC+, and WMA formats and more. It is available in Bronze Black and Powder Pink.

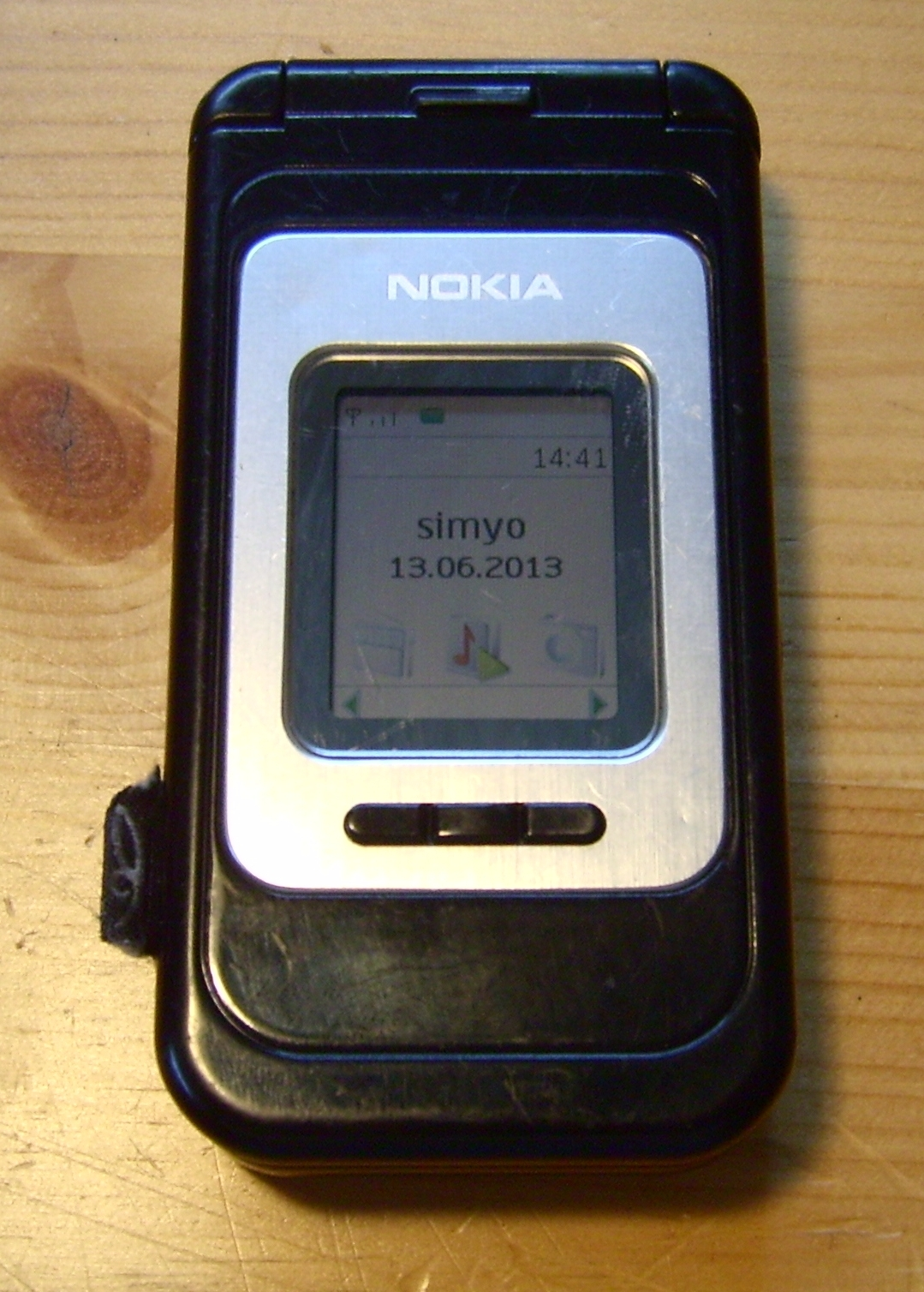
A 7390 with its clamshell shut.

== Technical specifications ==
- Weight: 115 grams
- Size: 90 mm × 47 mm × 19 mm
- 320x240 internal display rated at 16 million colors
- 160x128 external display rated at 262 thousand colors.
- 2G Network: 900/1800/1900
- 3G Network: UMTS 2100
- Uses the Series 40 interface
- Talktime: 3 Hours
- Standby: Up to 200 Hours

=== Imaging and video ===
- 3.15 MP camera with up to 8× zoom
- Autofocus, Flash, Self-timer
- Secondary VGA camera for videocalls
- Image formats: JPEG, Exif
- Built in Video Player
- Video Formats: 3GPP formats (H.263) and MPEG-4

=== Entertainment ===
- Integrated Music Player
- Supported music formats: AAC, AAC+, eAAC+, MP3, MP4, WMA, AMR-NB, SP-MIDI, MIDI Tones (poly 64), True tones
- FM Radio with Visual Radio
- Mobile Web Browser

=== Data connections ===
- GPRS: Class 10 (4+1/3+2 slots), 32 - 48 kbit/s
- HSCSD: Yes
- EDGE: Class 10, 236.8 kbit/s
- 3G: Yes, 384 kbit/s
- Wireless LAN: No
- Bluetooth: Yes, 2.0 with A2DP
- Infrared: Port Yes
- USB: Yes, Pop-Port
