= Nokia 7230 =

Mobile phone model

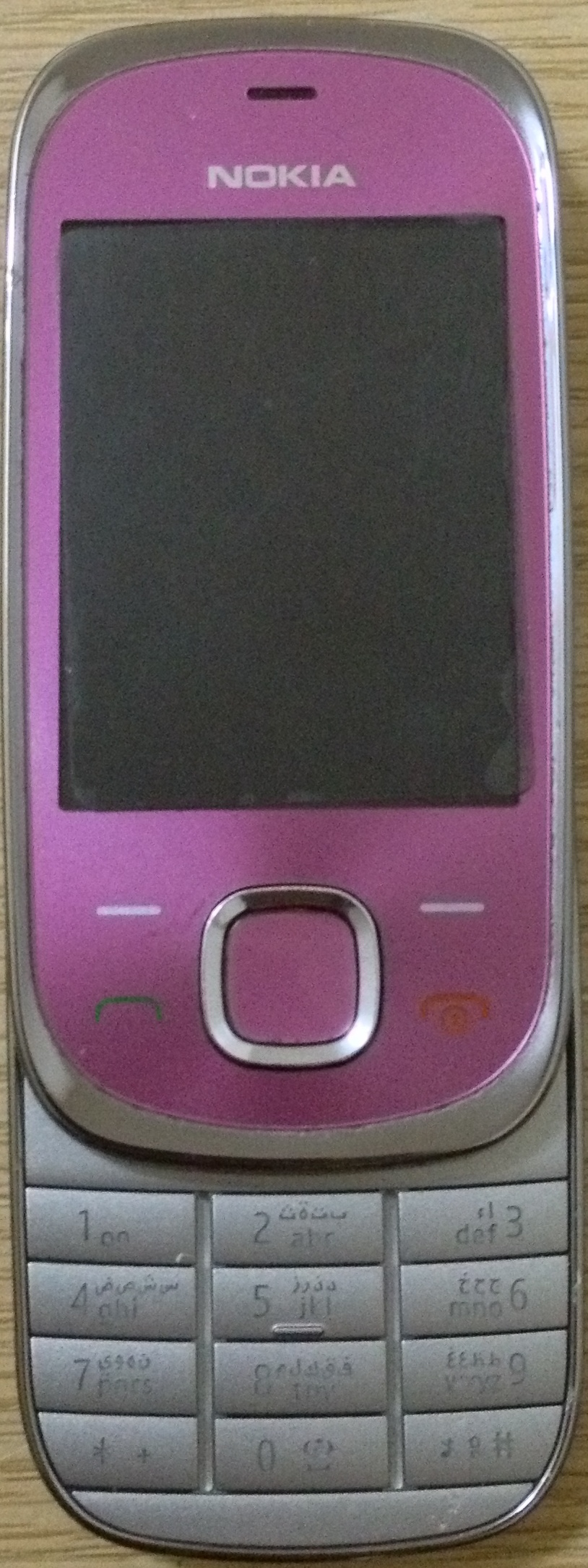
- A pink body Nokia 7230
- Manufacturer: Nokia
- Series: Series 7
- Availability by region: 2010
- Predecessor: Nokia 7370
- Successor: Nokia X5; Nokia 700
- Compatible networks: GSM, GPRS, EDGE, UMTS
- Form factor: Slider
- Dimensions: 106.4×43.6×11.7 mm (4.19×1.72×0.46 in)
- Weight: 100 g (4 oz) g
- Operating system: Nokia RM-604 V 10.81
- Memory: 71MB
- Removable storage: MicroSD, max 16GB
- Battery: BL-4CT 3.7V 860mAh
- Rear camera: 3.2 megapixels
- Display: 2.4 inch
- Connectivity: Bluetooth, USB, USB On-The-Go
- Data inputs: Keypad

The Nokia 7230 is a metallic grilled 3.5G slider phone from Nokia. It was released in 2010.

== Specifications ==
=== Hardware and design ===
The Nokia 7230 is a slim slider with a glossy, curvaceous design. The sides have a chrome-like finish with a dedicated button for the camera and a matte textured plastic battery cover on the back. While the phone looks deceptively solid, once you take it in hand, its flimsy low-end nature becomes evident. The screen is surrounded by a finely textured panel that covers two soft keys, a send button and an end button with a five way d-pad within. This panel comes in pink or graphite, as does the battery cover.

It sports a high resolution 2.4-inch (61 mm) vertical display that supports up to 262 thousand colors. It features a 3.2 megapixel camera without flash support and is capable of recording videos at QVGA resolution at 15 frames per second. It has an internal memory of 71 MB and is further expandable via memory card expansion slot (not hot-swappable as it is located under the battery) up to 16 GB. It supports many image file formats including jpg and gif, and supports many audio file formats such as aac, mp3, wma, midi, wav. It runs on the Series 40 6th edition user interface.
