= Nokia 7510 Supernova =

Flip phone made by Nokia

- Manufacturer: Nokia
- Predecessor: Nokia 7070 Prism; Nokia 7390
- Compatible networks: GSM 850/900/1800/1900
- Form factor: flip
- Dimensions: 92.5×46.4×16.7 mm (3.64×1.83×0.66 in), 63 cc
- Weight: 134 g (5 oz)
- Memory: 27 MB internal
- Removable storage: 512 MB bundled microSD card, up to 8 GB supported
- Battery: 3.7V 870 mAh (model BL-5BT)
- Rear camera: 2-megapixel
- Display: 2.2" 240 x 320 (QVGA) 16.7 million colours
- External display: monochrome TFT 128 x 160
- Connectivity: Bluetooth, USB

The Nokia 7510 Supernova is a phone made by Nokia. It contains a 2-megapixel camera and a 2.2" QVGA colour display with a 320x 240 resolution.

It was initially available in the United States, but it spread into other markets; firmware was available for nearly all markets.
