= Nokia 7280 =

Cell phone model released in 2004

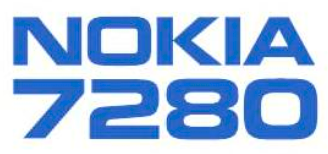

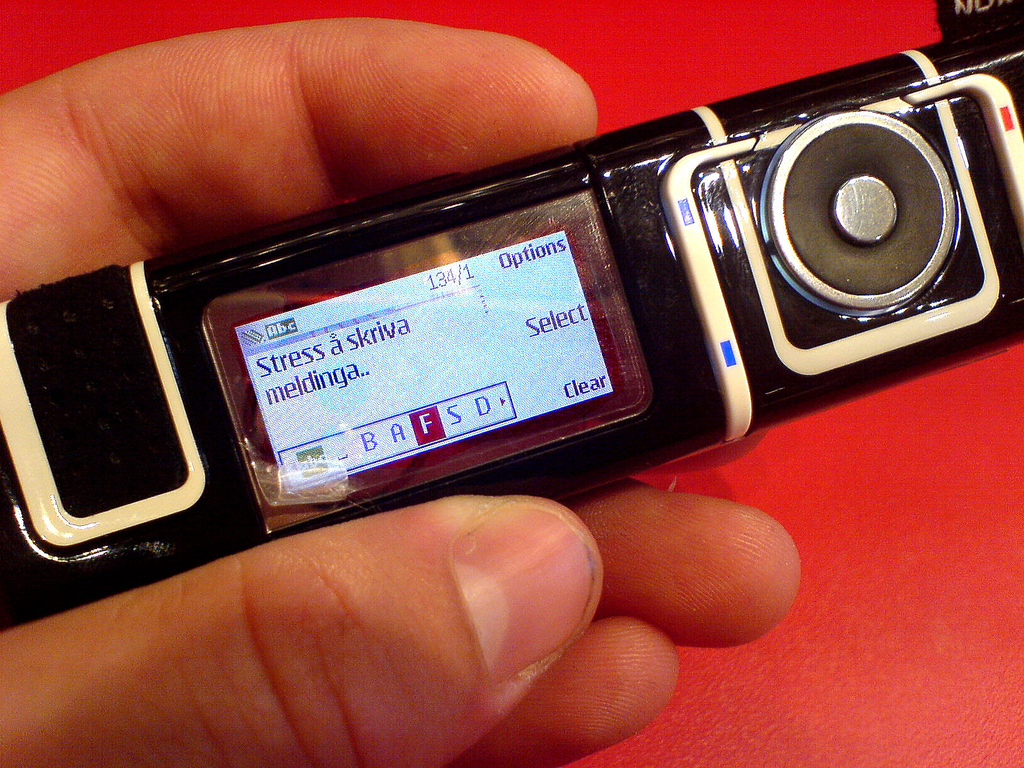
Nokia 7280

The Nokia 7280 is a GSM mobile phone designed and developed by Nokia, and has been popularly nicknamed the "lipstick" phone. It was announced on 9 September 2004 alongside the Nokia 7270 and Nokia 7260, all as part of their fashion line of mobile cell phones.

Running Series 40, the handset supports MMS, GPRS and SyncML. It has a VGA camera. Its design features a slider end and a Navi-Spinner in the place of a keypad. The 7280 has a unique wide display with a resolution of 208 x 104 pixels, an 18:9 aspect ratio. The battery could only be replaced by an authorised service center.

As part of Nokia's "Fashion Phone" line, it has black, white and red styling, and a screen that fades to a mirror when inactive. Fortune magazine listed it as one of the best products of 2004 while its design was praised by the jury in the iF product design awards for 2005. Adverts for the Nokia Fashion Collection were directed by photographer David LaChapelle. There are a total of 3 versions of the commercial, each featuring one of the 3 phones including the Nokia 7280. The others are Nokia 7260 and 7270.

The phone is shown in the Pussycat Dolls' "Beep" music video and in the music video for "Get Right" by Jennifer Lopez.

It was succeeded by the Nokia 7380 which was released in 2006.
