= Orlando Premium Outlets =

Orlando Premium Outlets may refer to:

- Orlando International Premium Outlets on International Drive, formerly known as Prime Outlets-International
- Orlando Vineland Premium Outlets on Vineland Avenue, formerly known as Orlando Premium Outlets
