= Nikon Coolpix 7900 =

Compact point-and-shoot digital camera model

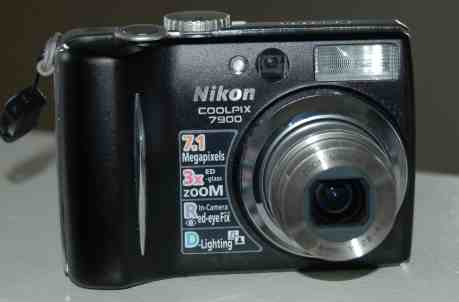

Overview
- Maker: Nikon
- Type: Compact digital camera

Lens
- Lens: Non-interchangeable, 38- 114 mm, (35 mm equivalent) 3x optical zoom, F 2.8 - 4.9

Sensor/medium
- Sensor: 25.4 mm CCD, 7.4 million total pixels
- Maximum resolution: 7.1 million pixels, 7M (3,072 x 2,304) / 5M (2,592 x 1,944) / 3M (2,048 x 1,536)
- Film speed: Auto & ISO 50, 100, 200, 400
- Storage media: 13.5 MB internal memory, SD/MMC slot

Focusing
- Focus areas: 5-area auto selection

Exposure/metering
- Metering modes: Center Weighted

Flash
- Flash: Built-in. Available modes are: Auto, Red-eye Reduction, Anytime flash, Flash cancel and Slow sync. The flash has a range of 0.3 - 4.5m

Shutter
- Shutter speed range: 4 - 1/2000 sec
- Continuous shooting: 1.7 frame/s, up to 29 frames (7M/Normal)

Viewfinder
- Viewfinder: Optical

Image processing
- White balance: Auto & Daylight, Incandescent, Fluorescent, Cloudy, Shade, Speedlight and Manual

General
- LCD screen: 50.8 mm, TFT, 115,000 pixels
- Battery: EN-EL5 rechargeable lithium ion battery
- Weight: 150 g (5 oz) (without battery)

The Nikon Coolpix 7900 is a compact point-and-shoot digital camera which was manufactured and distributed by Nikon in 2005. It has since been discontinued.
