= Prismatic (app) =

Social news curation and discovery app

- Prismatic’s homepage in June 2014
- Company type: Private
- Website type: Social network service, News aggregator
- Available in: English
- Headquarters: San Francisco, California, {{{location_country}}}
- Area served: Worldwide
- Founders: Bradford Cross, Aria Haghighi
- Industry: Internet
- Website: www.getprismatic.com
- Commercial: Yes
- Launched: April 10, 2012
- Current status: Closed in December 2015 (news app)
- Written in: Clojure, ClojureScript

Prismatic was a social news curation and discovery application for various Web browsers and mobile devices running iOS. It combined machine learning, user experience design, and interaction design to create a new way to discover, consume, and share media. Prismatic software used social network aggregation and machine learning algorithms to filter the content that aligns with the interests of a specific user. Prismatic integrated with Facebook, Twitter, and Pocket to gather information about user's interests and suggest the most relevant stories to read.

Prismatic initially launched in 2012 for web browsers and the iPhone, followed by the release of an iPad app on December 19, 2013.

On December 20, 2015, the company closed its consumer-facing apps and focused on offering its machine learning algorithms to publishers and hedge funds.

Prismatic was produced by Prismatic, Inc., a United States–based software company founded in 2010 by Bradford Cross and Aria Haghighi and headquartered in San Francisco, California.

== Features ==
The Prismatic app was centered on a feed of news stories. Users can share stories to connected services like Twitter and Facebook, save stories for later reading, comment on stories, and browse tens of thousands of topics.

People can do three main things on Prismatic: Tell the service what topics they are interested in and which people they want to follow; read and look at the suggested articles and photos; and share content back to those topics. Support for video is coming next.

— Liz Gannes, AllThingsD

== History ==
Though the Prismatic app was featured on the front page of the Apple app store, and Prismatic received $15 million funding back in 2012, the industry of news aggregation apps have been difficult to break through and Prismatic had to close their doors on December 20, 2015.

=== Invention ===
Prismatic was founded by Bradford Cross and Aria Haghighi in 2010. Before starting Prismatic, Cross was a head of research at Flightcaster, a Y Combinator funded startup. Haghighi received a BS in Mathematics at Stanford and completed an NLP and machine learning focused PhD at UC Berkeley before joining Prismatic.

The initial technical and design research was completed in the winter of 2010. The first prototypes were ready by April 2011. Invitation only beta opened in April 2012 followed by a public web app release in June 2012. An iPhone app was released in August 2012. Prismatic released version 2.0.0 on Apple's App Store in December 2013.

=== Funding ===
Prismatic raised $1.5 million in venture financing in early 2012 from investors including Battery Ventures and Javelin Venture Partners. On December 5, 2012 Prismatic announced that it had raised $15 million in Series A from Jim Breyer and Yuri Milner

=== Public response ===
Prismatic had been positively reviewed by multiple news outlets, including The New York Times, TechCrunch, Business Insider, GigaOm, AllThingsD, and PandoDaily.

Apple had repeatedly featured the Prismatic iOS app. Prismatic had an average rating of 4.5 stars on the iOS App Store, from over 2,000 user ratings.

== Technology ==
Prismatic primarily used Clojure and ClojureScript in production. Prismatic has open-sourced a large part of its technology stack on GitHub, including Plumbing, om-tools, Schema, fnHouse, and hiphip.
