= MBM (file format) =

Multibitmap
- Filename extension: .mbm
- Internet media type: image/x-epoc-mbm, application/octet-stream
- Type of format: Image
- Container for: BMP file format
- Contained by: Symbian installation source
- Standard: Symbian application

MBM is shortened from MultiBitMap which, as the name suggests, is a container for a set of bitmap images. The contained bitmaps are not stored verbatim. Rather, each one is stored with a modified bitmap header with no data compression or with 8-, 12-, 16-, or 24-bit RLE compression.

MBM files are used by lots of Symbian GUI applications to store their graphical content.

== See also ==
- Symbian OS
- Symbian Ltd.
- Symbian installation source
