= Nokia 7900 =

2007 cell phone model

Nokia 7900 Prism
- Manufacturer: Nokia
- Availability by region: 2007
- Predecessor: Nokia 7360
- Successor: Nokia 7310 Supernova
- Related: Nokia 6500 classic Nokia 7500 Prism
- Compatible networks: GSM-850 / GSM-900 / GSM-1900 / GSM-1800 / UMTS
- Form factor: Bar
- Dimensions: 4.4" x 1.77" x 0.44" (112 x 45 x 11.3 mm)
- Weight: 101 g (3.56 oz)
- Operating system: S40 5th Edition
- Memory: 920 MB Flash Maximum User Storage
- Removable storage: No
- Battery: LiIon 850 mAh (BL-6P)
- Rear camera: 2-megapixel (1600 x 1200 px)
- Display: OLED, 16M colors, 240 x 320 pixels, 2 inches
- Connectivity: Bluetooth, MicroUSB

The Nokia 7900 is a mobile phone produced by Nokia and announced on August 7, 2007. It is part of Nokia's Prism Collection. It runs S40 5th Edition. It is a quadband phone and has WCDMA on 850 MHz and 2100 MHz. The 2-inch (51 mm) screen is powered by OLED technology, Nokia's first, and has a resolution of 320x240 pixels showing 16 million colors. Included is a 2-megapixel camera with flash, an 850mAh battery, and 1 GB of on board memory.

Dimensions are as follows: 112 x 45 x 11.3 mm; 101 grams.

There is a Nokia 7900 Crystal Prism, which has the same features, but the material of the casing is different.
