= Nokia 7500 =

2007 cell phone model

Nokia 7500 Prism
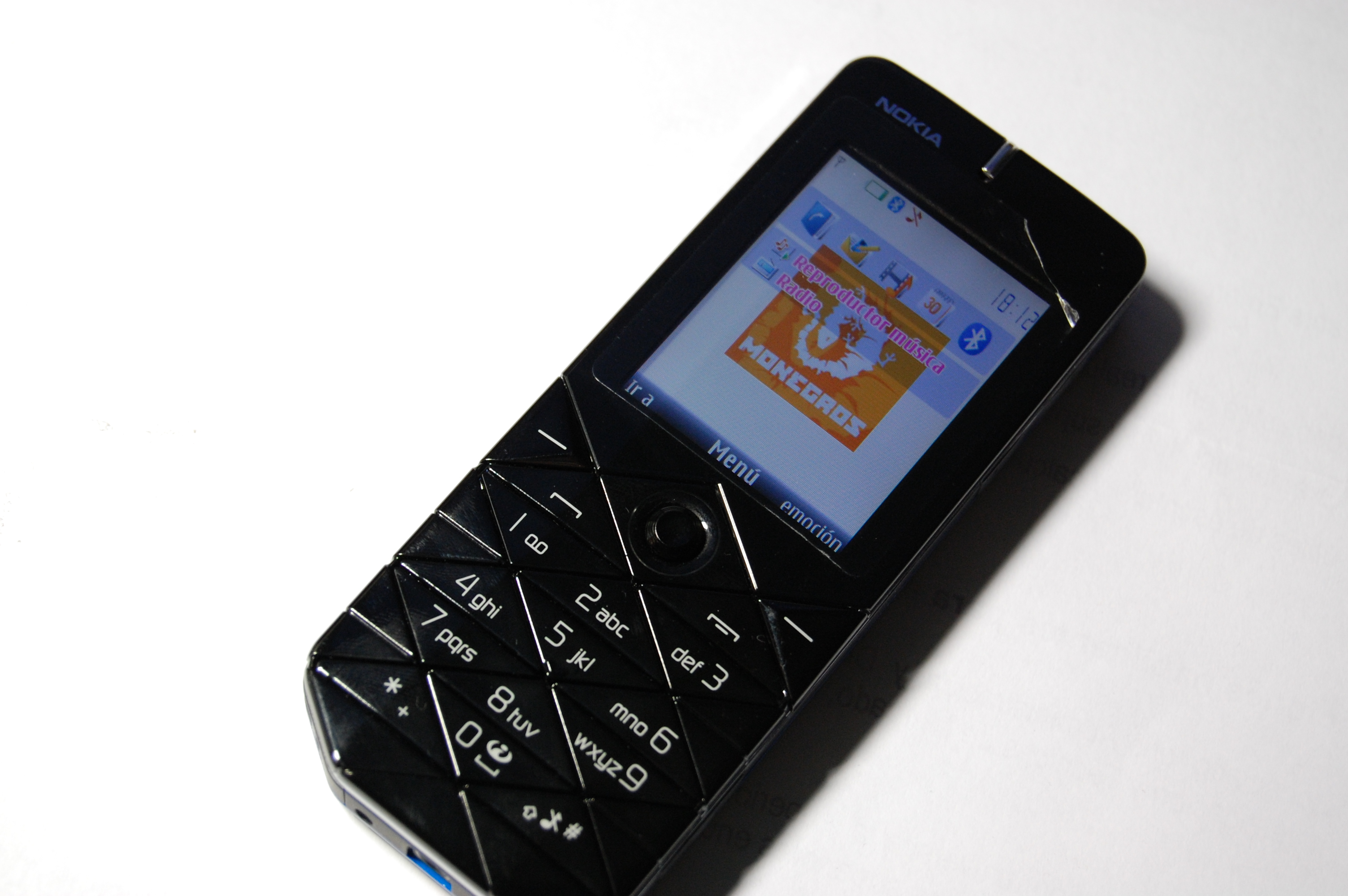
- Manufacturer: Nokia
- Availability by region: July 2007
- Predecessor: Nokia 7360
- Successor: Nokia 7210 Supernova
- Related: Nokia 7900 Prism; Nokia 7900 Crystal Prism
- Compatible networks: GSM-850 / GSM-900 / GSM-1900 / GSM-1800 / UMTS
- Form factor: Bar
- Dimensions: 109×44×14 mm (4.29×1.73×0.55 in) (4.29" * 1.73" * 0.55")
- Weight: 83 g
- Operating system: S40 5th Edition
- Memory: 30 MB (built-in, flash shared memory)
- Removable storage: Yes
- Battery: Li-ion 700 mAh
- Rear camera: 2-megapixel (1600 x 1200 px)
- Display: LCD, 16.7M colors, 240 x 320 pixels, 2 inches
- Connectivity: Bluetooth, MicroUSB

The Nokia 7500 Prism is a mobile phone produced by Nokia. It is part of Nokia's Prism Collection. It is a triband phone that runs S40 5th Edition. The 2-inch (51 mm) screen has a resolution of 320x240 pixels showing 16 million colors. Included is a 2-megapixel camera with flash, a 512 MB microSD card, and a 700mAh battery. It launches during 3Q 2007.

Nokia 7500 has a stereo FM radio and a music player which can play mp3, wma and several other formats. It can play 3gp and mp4 video. The videos can be seen in full screen mode too.

== Other specifications ==
Type	Specification
Form Factor	Bar Internal Antenna
Battery Life	Talk: 2.5 hours Standby: 240 hrs (10 days)
Phone Book Capacity	1000
SAR	0.41
Multiple Languages	Yes
Ringer Profiles	Yes
Vibrate	Yes
Bluetooth	version 2.0 with A2DP
PC Sync	Yes
USB	Built-in Mini-USB connector
Multiple Numbers per Name	Yes
Voice Dialing	Yes
Custom Graphics	Yes
Custom Ringtones	Yes
Data-Capable	Yes
Flight Mode	Yes
Packet Data	Technology: EDGE (EGPRS) class 10
WAP / Web Browser	WAP 2.0 / supports HTML, XHTML, TCP/IP
Predictive Text Entry	Technology: T9
Side Keys	Volume and camera keys on right
Memory Card Slot	Card Type: microSD / TransFlash up to 2 GB. 512 MB card included (depending on service provider)
Email Client	Protocols Supported: IMAP4, POP3, SMTP supports attachments
MMS	MMS 1.2 / up to 300 KB per message / SMIL
Text Messaging	2-Way: Yes
FM Radio	Stereo: Yes
Streaming Video	Protocol: 3GPP
Video Capture	QCIF resolution, 15 frame/s, H.263 format
Alarm	Yes
Calculator	Yes
Calendar	Yes
SyncML	Yes
To-Do List	Yes
Voice Memo	Yes
Games	City Bloxx, Music Guess, Snake III, Sudoku
Java ME	Version: MIDP 2.0
Headset Jack (2.5 mm)	Yes
Push-To-Talk	Some versions only Type: PoC
Speaker Phone	Yes
