= Highway Encounter =

1985 video game

- Publisher: Vortex Software
- Designer: Costa Panayi
- Platforms: ZX Spectrum, Commodore 64, Sharp MZ, Amstrad CPC, MSX, Tatung Einstein
- Release: 1985
- Genre: Action
- Mode: Single-player

Highway Encounter is a video game published for the ZX Spectrum, Amstrad CPC, MSX, Commodore 64, Sharp MZ, and Tatung Einstein by Vortex Software in 1985. It was written by Costa Panayi who also coded Android, Android Two, TLL, Cyclone, and Revolution.

== Summary ==
Highway Encounter is a strategy/action game played from a 3D isometric perspective in which the players must successfully chaperone a bomb along a long, straight stretch of highway and into the alien base at the end of it. There are thirty screens to pass through and most are filled with hazards that threaten to block player's progress (such as barrels) or destroy the player (aliens and explosive mines).

Players control a robotic "Vorton" (resembling a dalek from Doctor Who) and one of the features that provides Highway Encounter with its unique appeal is that the bomb is constantly being pushed onwards by player's extra lives - four more Vortons, who accompany the player along the highway. A key strategic element to the game is for the player character to travel several screens ahead of the bomb to clear a safe path for it; normally this would be done by temporarily blocking the bomb's forward motion, but if the bomb is left in an unsafe location, it is possible for all your extra lives to be lost without the player character being destroyed once. Once all spare lives are lost, the player character must manually push the bomb.

== Reception ==
Reception

Awards
Publication	Award
Amstrad Action	Mastergame
Crash	Crash Smash

The Spectrum version of the game was voted number 40 in the Your Sinclair Official Top 100 Games of All Time.

== Legacy ==
There is an unfinished and officially unreleased, but available to download version for Atari ST made by Mark Haigh-Hutchinson and graphics by Costa Panayi, from 1990. Versions for Amiga and Sega Mega Drive were also planned but Hutchinson stated that the Mega Drive version was left unpublished.

Highway Encounter was followed by a sequel, Alien Highway, in 1986.
