= Costa Panayi =

Computer game programmer

Costa Panayi is a former computer game programmer active during the 1980s. He founded Vortex Software with Paul Canter, publishing games for the ZX Spectrum, Commodore 64 and Amstrad CPC.

He is of Greek Cypriot descent, and studied engineering at the University of Salford. After graduation, he started to work as a mechanical engineer for British Aerospace, when he got into programming games business from his hobby interests.

In 1982, he studied Sinclair BASIC and subsequently formed his company Vortex Software along with Luke Andrews and Mark Haigh-Hutchinson. They wrote a variety of games, including Gunlaw, Deflektor, the Android series, and Tornado Low Level for the ZX Spectrum.

His games achieved critical success; Tornado Low Level and Highway Encounter appeared in the "Your Sinclair official top 100", for example, and in them he developed original 3D interfaces.

In 1995, he was working as a design consultant for Fisher Price.

== List of games ==
- ZX81 Othello (1981)
- Word Mastermind (1981)
- Pontoon (1981)
- Crash (1981)
- Cosmos (1982), Abbex Electronics
- Astral Convoy (1982), Vortex Software
- Android One: The Reactor Run (1983), Vortex Software
- Android Two (1983), Vortex Software
- Tornado Low Level (1984), Vortex Software
- Cyclone (1985), Vortex Software
- Highway Encounter (1985), Vortex Software
- Alien Highway: Encounter 2 (1986), Vortex Software
- Revolution (1986), U.S. Gold
- Deflektor (1987), Gremlin Graphics
- Hostile All Terrain Encounter (1989), Gremlin Graphics
