= TLL =

TLL may refer to:

- Lennart Meri Tallinn Airport, Estonia (IATA airport code)
- Tetela language of the Democratic Republic of the Congo (ISO 639-3 code: tll)
- Terra Lliure, a Catalan nationalist paramilitary group
- The Linda Lindas, American rock band
- Thesaurus Linguae Latinae, a Latin dictionary
- Tornado Low Level, a ZX Spectrum game
- Super Mario Bros.: The Lost Levels, a 1986 Famicom game that is the Japanese sequel to Super Mario Bros.
