= Contact Sam Cruise =

1986 video game

- Cassette re-release
- Developer: David Reidy
- Publisher: Microsphere
- Designer: David Reidy
- Platform: ZX Spectrum
- Release: EU: 1986
- Genre: Action-adventure
- Mode: Single-player

Contact Sam Cruise is an action-adventure game created by David Reidy with graphics by Keith Warrington for the ZX Spectrum and released by Microsphere in 1986. Using a modified Skool Daze engine, the game follows the exploits of player-controlled private detective Sam Cruise.

== Plot ==
Title screen

The player controls Sam Cruise, a private investigator in an unnamed city in an unnamed year. Sam has received a call from a woman called Lana requesting he meet her in a hotel room in town. "So began", says Cruise in the game's opening "the case of the Bali Budgie" (a play on the title of the noir film The Maltese Falcon).

== Gameplay ==
The game is made in the style of a 1930s detective movie and Sam needs to solve a murder. Play takes place in a scrolling two-dimensional environment consisting of part of a city in the United States.

Although the player is given considerable freedom to explore the game-area the solution to the game is a linear progression through various puzzles. The main character is usually given hints on how to complete the next stage via in-game phone calls. Players are able to enter buildings (although the view remains outside the building with Sam visible through the windows - there is no cutaway), switch lights on and off, open doors and collect money (by somersaulting onto the bills blowing down the street). Sam can also don disguises for various parts of his mission and at times will also have to evade police - for example by pulling out building fuses to cut the lights at the start of the game when he finds a dead body. Sam carries a limited amount of money in dollar bills and this ticks away slowly with the game ending if Sam's money-level reaches zero.

If Sam finds himself arrested by the police he is taken to a police station and deposited in a cell for a period of time before being released on bail which will reduce the amount of money he has. Sam can also find himself bodily picked up by gangsters and hurled from the top of a building (one of the favoured method of disposal by the gangsters in this game). Although this will not kill him, he will become unconscious and have been mugged (i.e. lost more money) when he regains consciousness. Sam also has a limited number of first aid packs (depicted as red crosses on the screen display) that are used-up if he is shot by gangsters. If these run out, the game ends.

== Reception ==
Reception

Awards
Publication	Award
Crash	Crash Smash
C+VG	Game of the Month

Contact Sam Cruise was well received, and a Computer and Video Games "game of the month". Crash awarded the game a "Crash Smash" for receiving a 91% rating, and the front cover of the budget re-release featured the Crash Smash logo prominently. Your Sinclair awarded the game 8 out of 10, noting that it was an early adopter of icons for gameplay. Both the Your Sinclair and Computer & Video Games reviews were written in a hard-boiled detective style.
