= Timex =

Timex may refer to:

== Companies and brands ==
- Timex Group USA, The original American Timex company, formerly known as Timex Corporation
  - Timex Group, Holding company formed following the acquisition of the original American company.
- Timex Audio, brand name licensed to the American company SDI Technologies

== See also ==
- Timex Social Club, American R&B music group
- Timex Sinclair, a defunct 1982 joint venture between the British company Sinclair Research and Timex Corporation
