= Deflektor =

1987 video game

- Developer: Vortex Software
- Publisher: Gremlin Graphics
- Designer: Costa Panayi
- Programmer: Costa Panayi
- Composer: Ben Daglish
- Platforms: Amstrad CPC, Atari ST, Commodore 64, ZX Spectrum, Amiga, PC-98, X68000
- Release: December 1987
- Genre: Puzzle
- Mode: Single-player

Deflektor is a puzzle video game developed by Vortex Software and published by Gremlin Graphics in December 1987. The game was ported to the X68000 by Bullet-Proof Software and the Atari 8-bit computers developed by Atari Corporation in 1988, but was not published. According to Deflektor X4 remake programmer Ignacio Pérez Gil, Deflektor developer Costa Panayi endorsed the creation and distribution of the non-commercial open-source freeware in the 2000s.

Deflektor has been well received by reviewers. Critics emphasized its high appeal and originality. The game also received positive feedback for its graphics, difficulty, and in-depth exploration. It was followed by a sequel in 1989, Mindbender.

== Gameplay ==
The beam is transferred by fibre optics.

Deflektor is a real-time puzzle game that takes place in an optical circuit. The player must rotate mirrors to deflect a beam in order to destroy all the cells of each level. There are also other devices which the player cannot touch with the beam for too long because it will make the system overload. The player only has a certain amount of time to complete each level. There are also various other items on each level which can be collected and a practise mode.

== Development ==
Costa Panayi was the principal programmer, game designer and artist for Vortex Software, when Panayi was programming primarily on the ZX Spectrum. He developed and released Revolution, which later influenced the creation of Deflektor. The game was based on a simple physical phenomenon which was further modified in terms of game mechanics. Panayi was inspired to create the game by observing scientific software that worked with lasers. The development was carried out with the idea of being different from existing trends in the gaming industry.

The development of the original game for the ZX Spectrum was handled by Panayi himself and was published by Gremlin Graphics. A month before its release date, the game was announced in magazines.

== Reception ==
Reception

Review scores
Publication	Score		
Publication	Amiga	C64	ZX
ACE	94%	91%	91%
Computer and Video Games	N/A	10/10	10/10
Your Sinclair	N/A	N/A	90%
Zzap!	N/A	81%	N/A

Award
Publication	Award
Amstrad Action	Mastergame

Writing for Zzap! magazine in February 1988, Julian Rignall wrote that "Deflektor is very enjoyable, and provides an original and worthwhile way to kill time". According to Amstrad Action, Deflektor was the best game of March 1988. In 1988, Deflektor was included in the 100 best games by ACE where the game was described as unique, but easy because passing the level is enough to test all the conditions of the mirror. In 1990, the author of an article in Your Sinclair ranked Deflektor seventh out of the nine best puzzles and described it as distinctive and interesting.
