= Alien Highway =

1986 video game

Alien Highway: Encounter 2
- Developer: Mark Haigh-Hutchinson
- Publisher: Vortex Software
- Platforms: Amstrad CPC; ZX Spectrum
- Release: 1986
- Genre: Action
- Mode: Single-player

Alien Highway: Encounter 2 is an isometric action game released by Vortex in 1986 for the ZX Spectrum and Amstrad CPC. It was programmed by Mark Haigh-Hutchinson and is the sequel to Highway Encounter.

== Gameplay ==
Gameplay is similar to Highway Encounter, with the player controlling a "Vorton" robot in its attempt to deliver a bomb to an alien base at the end of a highway. Various enemies and obstacles lie in its path.

A notable difference is that the player has a single Vorton with an energy meter, instead of five lives; accordingly, the bomb must be pushed by the player, whereas in the previous game it was pushed by the player's spare Vortons.

== Development ==
Mark Haigh-Hutchinson, the developer of the game:

After Highway Costa [Panayi] wanted to come up with something completely different again. Since I was now working full-time for Vortex it was decided that I should write Alien Highway whilst Costa developed his new ideas. I had previously written Android One for the Amstrad CPC (in my spare time at University) and then converted Highway Encounter to the CPC in 8 weeks after graduation. Alien Highway attempted to retain the essence of the original game yet expand the gameplay and introduce a random element into the game. It was also considerably faster than the original.

== Reception ==
Reception

Review scores
Publication	Score
Amstrad Action	89%
Amtix	80%
Crash	88%
Computer and Video Games	33/40
Sinclair User	5/5
Your Sinclair	9/10

Awards
Publication	Award
Computer and Video Games	C+VG Hit
Your Sinclair	Megagame

Alien Highway received positive reviews.
