= Star Wars: Shadows of the Empire (video game) =

1996 video game

- North American PC cover art
- Developer: LucasArts
- Publishers: Nintendo (N64); LucasArts (PC)
- Director: Mark Haigh-Hutchinson
- Designer: Jon Knoles
- Programmers: Eric Johnston; Mark Haigh-Hutchinson; Mark Blattel
- Artist: Jon Knoles
- Composers: Joel McNeely; John Williams
- Platforms: Nintendo 64, Windows
- Release: Nintendo 64: NA: December 2, 1996; PAL: March 1, 1997; Windows: NA: September 9, 1997; PAL: February 3, 1998
- Genre: Action
- Mode: Single-player

Star Wars: Shadows of the Empire is a 1996 action video game developed by LucasArts and published by Nintendo for the Nintendo 64. It is primarily a third-person shooter, with multiple types of vehicular combat and third-person shooting sequences. A version for Windows was released by LucasArts in 1997.

The player controls the mercenary Dash Rendar to help Luke Skywalker and rescue Princess Leia from Prince Xizor. It is part of the Star Wars: Shadows of the Empire multimedia project and takes place between The Empire Strikes Back and Return of the Jedi. Tracks from the multimedia project's soundtrack are in the musical score. The game received mixed reviews from critics and was the third-best-selling Nintendo 64 game for 1997, with more than one million copies sold.

== Gameplay ==
Protagonist Dash Rendar rides a swoop bike in a high-speed chase sequence.

Star Wars: Shadows of the Empire plays primarily as a third-person shooter. Players control the protagonist, Dash Rendar. His blaster pistol recharges after each shot, and he can pick up additional powerups for the gun. In later levels, Rendar acquires a jetpack to traverse larger gaps. The jetpack can also be used underwater in the sewer level. He has limited health, which can be replenished with health packs located throughout the game. The player is given a finite amount of lives to complete the game. Additional lives can be acquired, however if the player runs out of lives a game over sequence occurs. Each level is timed and challenge points are awarded for performing specific actions or finding hidden tokens, to unlock rewards.

The game features other non-shooter elements. In the opening level, Rendar pilots a snowspeeder in defense of the Rebel base on Hoth. Rendar controls the turret of his ship, the Outrider, in 360-degree space battles to destroy a specific number of enemy ships. In other space sequences, he pilots the ship, destroying targets with its forward cannons. In one sequence, Rendar makes a high-speed chase on swoop bikes, controlling the swoop and attack to eliminate an enemy gang.

== Plot ==
The story is divided into four chapters. "Part I: Escape from Echo Base" begins shortly before the battle of Hoth, as Dash Rendar and his droid co-pilot, Leebo, arrive at Echo Base to deliver supplies. He briefly talks with Han Solo, who gets him temporary clearance to fly with Rogue Squadron. Dash pilots a snowspeeder into battle, and returns to Echo Base when the shield generator is destroyed, just as the Millennium Falcon leaves. He makes his way through the base, attempting to return to his ship, the Outrider. Dash encounters several wampas on the way, and has to fight an AT-ST, but eventually makes it back to Leebo and the Outrider, and they escape a Star Destroyer through an asteroid field.

"Part II: In Search of Boba Fett" begins after the end of The Empire Strikes Back, as Dash searches for Boba Fett, who holds Han Solo, frozen in carbonite. He hunts and battles IG-88, who is attempting to repair his ship on Ord Mantell after an altercation with Fett. The droid tells him that Fett is hiding on a moon of the planet Gall. Dash finds Fett, and damages his ship, the Slave I, but Fett escapes. Believing that the Emperor will let him take Darth Vader's place if Skywalker is killed, Prince Xizor orders Jabba the Hutt to kill Luke Skywalker.

In "Part III: Hunting the Assassins", Jabba sends a group of swoop bikers to Obi-Wan Kenobi's home, where Luke is practicing his Jedi skills. Dash races them to Kenobi's, and eliminates all members of the gang. Luke informs Dash of a secret imperial supercomputer aboard the Imperial Freighter Suprosa, containing unknown important Imperial construction plans for the Death Star II. Dash steals the computer, and battles with a cargo droid in a hangar.

"Part IV: Lair of the Dark Prince" begins with Luke, Lando Calrissian, Chewbacca, and Dash infiltrating Xizor's palace on Coruscant to save Princess Leia, whom Xizor has taken captive. Dash enters the palace through the underground sewer system, and battles an enormous dianoga, before entering the palace itself. While in the palace Dash plants thermal detonators in an effort to destroy it before Xizor summons his droid, which Dash quickly disposes of. After defeating the droid, Xizor flees to his Skyhook space station. Xizor's forces engage in battle with the Rebellion, but during the conflict an Imperial Star Destroyer arrives firing on both parties. The conflict turns as the Star Destroyer engages Xizor and his forces. Utilizing this distraction, Dash destroys the Skyhook's outer defenses and proceeds to fly inside the station, destroying its core. Dash is presumably killed in the blast, along with Xizor.

A short pre-credits scene shows Luke and Leia on Tatooine, mourning Dash's death. If the game is completed on medium or higher difficulty levels, this is followed by an additional scene of Dash and Leebo, who had jumped to hyperspace to escape the blast. Leebo questions Dash's decision to keep the illusion they had died in the Skyhook's destruction, to which Dash says, "It's good to be remembered as a martyr without actually being dead, wouldn't you say?"

== Development ==
There was considerable pressure to finish the game in time for the Christmas 1996 deadline. This reality meant many, many late nights, with some team members regularly working over 100 hours every week for the best part of a year. [...] We had to release our game shortly after launch of the machine, [and so] were under more pressure than might usually have been encountered.

— Shadows of the Empire project lead Mark Haigh-Hutchinson

The work on Shadows of the Empire project started in late 1994 with the idea of making a side story to the movies. After dismissing the use of the main characters from the movies as the playable character of the new game, which gave the developers more freedom with the game and story, they built on a minor character from the book, Dash Rendar. He has many similarities to Han Solo, including a ship, the Outrider, which bears a close resemblance to Solo's Millennium Falcon. Jon Knoles, who was the game's senior artist and animator and previously worked on other LucasArts games for PC and SNES, is credited with bringing the idea of Shadows of the Empire and placing it between the films The Empire Strikes Back and Return of the Jedi.

LucasArts used the level editor of the Jedi engine, previously used on its games Star Wars: Dark Forces and Outlaws, to create the game's 3D environments. The game was programmed in C language. The game was originally planned to have 19 levels, Nintendo Power reported a reduction to 12 levels, and the final release has 10 levels.

LucasArts' choice to be an early adopter of the Nintendo 64 came from what company leaders believed were missed opportunities for revenue on game consoles. When work began on Shadows of the Empire, the Nintendo 64 hardware had not been finalized by Silicon Graphics (SGI) and Nintendo. Therefore, SGI approximated the console's performance and functionality profile using a US$140,000 SGI Onyx supercomputer with the RealityEngine2 graphics subsystem with the Performer 3D API — the architecture which had originally inspired SGI's design of the Nintendo 64. Two LucasArts developers already had extensive experience with the SGI platform, which eased the prototyping of the game for approximately 18 months until the Nintendo 64 hardware was finalized. Eventually, Nintendo 64 hardware cards were released for SGI Indy workstations, and given to the team to replace the software-based profile on Onyx. Because of the team's SGI expertise and the Nintendo 64's design heritage from the Onyx, they ported the game to the console in three days and continued development on Indy, while still performing large environmental precalculations on Onyx. For a prototype controller with which to test the game, they were delivered a modified SNES controller with a primitive analog joystick and Z trigger, designed by Konami. For maximal secrecy under strict nondisclosure agreement, the core team was not allowed to speak to anyone else about the hardware or the project, and the controller prototype was concealed within a cardboard box that the team members could place their hands into.

During development, Shigeru Miyamoto, senior marketing director of Nintendo, suggested that Dash be more animated. He suggested Rendar could become restless when waiting for the player to control him, and more animated in how he holds his weapons. Motion capture was done at LucasArts's sister company Industrial Light & Magic (ILM). The recorded animations proved to be unusable, and had to be redone manually using keyframes in Alias Power Animator. Music development began with MIDI approximations of the original film scores by composer John Williams. The team believed that MIDI-sequenced synthesis did not appropriately capture the essence of the music, and switched to digital samples of the original music. As part of the Shadows of the Empire multimedia project, a full soundtrack was composed by Joel McNeely and recorded with the Royal Scottish National Orchestra. Soundtrack samples were used in both versions of the game, with many full tracks in the Windows version. For the console version, due to limited cartridge space, the score was sampled down to 16-bit at 11 kHz in mono. After some discussion, Nintendo agreed to increase the cartridge space from 8 MB to 12 MB, giving the developers enough room to sample roughly 15 minutes of music on the cartridge. It is unique among Nintendo 64 games for using a digitized orchestral soundtrack, instead of synthesized music like that in Star Wars: Rogue Squadron. John Cygan voices the game's protagonist, Dash Rendar. Cygan reprises his role in Star Wars: X-Wing Alliance. His droid, Leebo, is voiced by Tom Kane. Luke Skywalker is voiced by Bob Bergen, official audio double for Mark Hamill. Prince Xizor, the game's primary antagonist, is voiced by Nick Tate.

Because of the much greater storage space available with a PC, LucasArts added full motion video (FMV) cinematic sequences and a number of additional speech clips to the Windows version. According to Knowles, when working on the Nintendo 64 version, the development team could have adapted the Windows version's FMV sequences into animated cutscenes using the game engine (which would have substantially lower quality than FMV, but use only a tiny fraction of the storage space), but this would have severely delayed the game's release, so they used just still images for the Nintendo 64 version's cutscenes. When supplemented with a 3D acceleration card, the Windows version runs at a resolution of 640 x 480 pixels. The Nintendo 64 version runs at a 320 x 240 resolution with hardware based blending and anti-aliasing features to make the difference in resolution less obvious.

After the game's demonstration at the 1996 Electronic Entertainment Expo met with mixed reactions, LucasArts canceled its plans to release it with the Nintendo 64 North American launch, postponing it until December to give the production team a few more months for quality.

== Release ==
Shadows of the Empire was released on December 2, 1996, for the Nintendo 64, three months after the console's launch. It was released in Japan on June 14, 1997. With the developer reporting more than one million copies sold by 1997, It is the third top-selling Nintendo 64 game for that year (September 1996 to August 1997) and the third top-selling game on any system for the 1996 Christmas shopping season. A version for Windows 95 was released on September 17, 1997. In coming decades, compatibility problems arose, so the game was re-released for 64-bit Windows systems on May 3, 2016, through GOG.

On July 26, 2019, the Nintendo 64 version was re-released physically in both a standard and Collector's Edition in limited quantities by Limited Run Games.

== Reception ==
Reception

Aggregate score
Aggregator	Score	
Aggregator	N64	PC
GameRankings	74%	62%

Review scores
Publication	Score	
Publication	N64	PC
AllGame	3/5	
Electronic Gaming Monthly	7.875/10	
GameFan	90/100 (Note: In GameFan's review, three critics scored Star Wars: Shadows of the Empire differently: 89, 91, 90.)	
GameRevolution	C+	
GameSpot	7.1/10	5.8/10
IGN	6.5/10	
N64 Magazine	78%	
Next Generation	2/5	
Nintendo Life	6/10	
PC Zone		88/100
Science Fiction Weekly	B+	

Shadows of the Empire has received mixed reviews from critics. While the opening Battle of Hoth sequence received praise, the other levels were deemed inferior in design. Some critics specified that though the different game styles add variety, none of them offered anything new or were executed well. The third-person shooter stages (which comprise the majority of the game) drew the strongest criticism, with reviews describing poor controls and camera angles which either give a cripplingly limited view or block the action with Dash's own body. Reviewers often praised the game's polygonal graphics as being convincing enough to affect the player's mood.

A reviewer for Next Generation remarked that the cartridge format was insufficient for a game of this type, resulting in issues — the lack of fluidity in the sewer waters, and the frequent looping of the music — which could have been easily solved with the greater storage capacity of CD. Chiefly criticizing the multi-genre gameplay, he said the game was especially disappointing in light of its great potential. Doug Perry of IGN similarly said that "we were disappointed again and again at this game's terrible control, its mediocre gameplay, and the overall knowledge that, once having finished it, you knew that the developers from LucasArts could have orchestrated a much better piece of videogaming." GamePro highly praised the soundtrack, but concluded that the issues with the gameplay made it a must-have for Star Wars fans but a poor choice for anyone else. Nintendo Power called it "a monster action game that combines the best of [LucasArts'] hyper TIE fighter and stalking Dark Forces genres", praising its wide variety of settings and scenarios, though they warned that it is extremely difficult on all but the easiest difficulty setting. Unlike many other critics, Shawn Smith of Electronic Gaming Monthly asserted that all the gameplay styles in Shadows of the Empire are done extremely well, and said it was the best Star Wars game he had played on either console or PC. The other three reviewers for EGM were less enthusiastic, with Sushi-X in particular summarizing the game as "a poor first-person shooter on top of an awesome Hoth battle sequence". GameSpot's John Broady claimed that "...the control, camera angles, and frustrating save feature keep it from reaching its full potential".

Most critics were amazed by the Battle of Hoth level, particularly its success in recreating the scene from The Empire Strikes Back as an interactive experience. The month prior to reviewing the game, EGM's lead editorial hailed this level as a watershed moment for movie-to-game adaptations, anticipating a new era in which film studios would take into account prospective game adaptations when making a movie.

EGM named Shadows of the Empire a runner-up for Nintendo 64 Game of the Year, behind Super Mario 64. Though they noted there was little competition for this category, because only eight Nintendo 64 games were released in the US in 1996, they called the game "a tour-de-force that all Star Wars fans must check out". They also named it a runner-up for Best Music, behind Wipeout XL.

In a retrospective review, AllGame's Scott Alan Marriott criticized the shooting sequences as "rather boring, probably due to the less involving third-person perspective".
