= Psion Wavefinder =

The middle of the Psion Wavefinder

The Psion Wavefinder was a computer peripheral for receiving digital audio broadcasting radio signals, made by Psion. It attached via USB to a personal computer, and had no loudspeakers or controls of its own, with only a flashing light on the device. Psion hoped it would become a design classic.

The Wavefinder was released on 17 October 2000, and gave access to both DAB audio and DAB Data services. The WaveFinder software had the ability to receive the 'Broadcast Website' service which some DAB broadcasters experimented with during the early days of digital radio - displaying HTML content provided by the broadcaster in the users' web browsers. The device initially retailed for £299 (at the time the cheapest digital radio on the UK market) and was bundled with new PCs sold by Dixons, but it was quickly discounted, retailing at £49.99 by that December, and was no longer produced by 2002. Psion ended support in 2004. The Wavefinder had frequent software problems, and an unofficial patch called WaveLite was released in 2001. The Wavefinder had widely reported problems with the USB drivers in Windows XP Service Pack 2.

It will work with Windows XP with SP3. There are reports that the Wavefinder works in Vista. It is not compatible with Macintosh computers, except perhaps through the use of a PC emulator or virtualisation solution. There is a driver and command line application for Linux, OpenDAB, that describes itself as "experimental". The unregulated power supply which is supplied with the Wavefinder has an output which can go up to 19 volts, this can cause the Wavefinder to develop faults. It is therefore recommended to use a regulated 12 volt supply.
