= Psion MC =

Series of laptop computers

Psion MC series
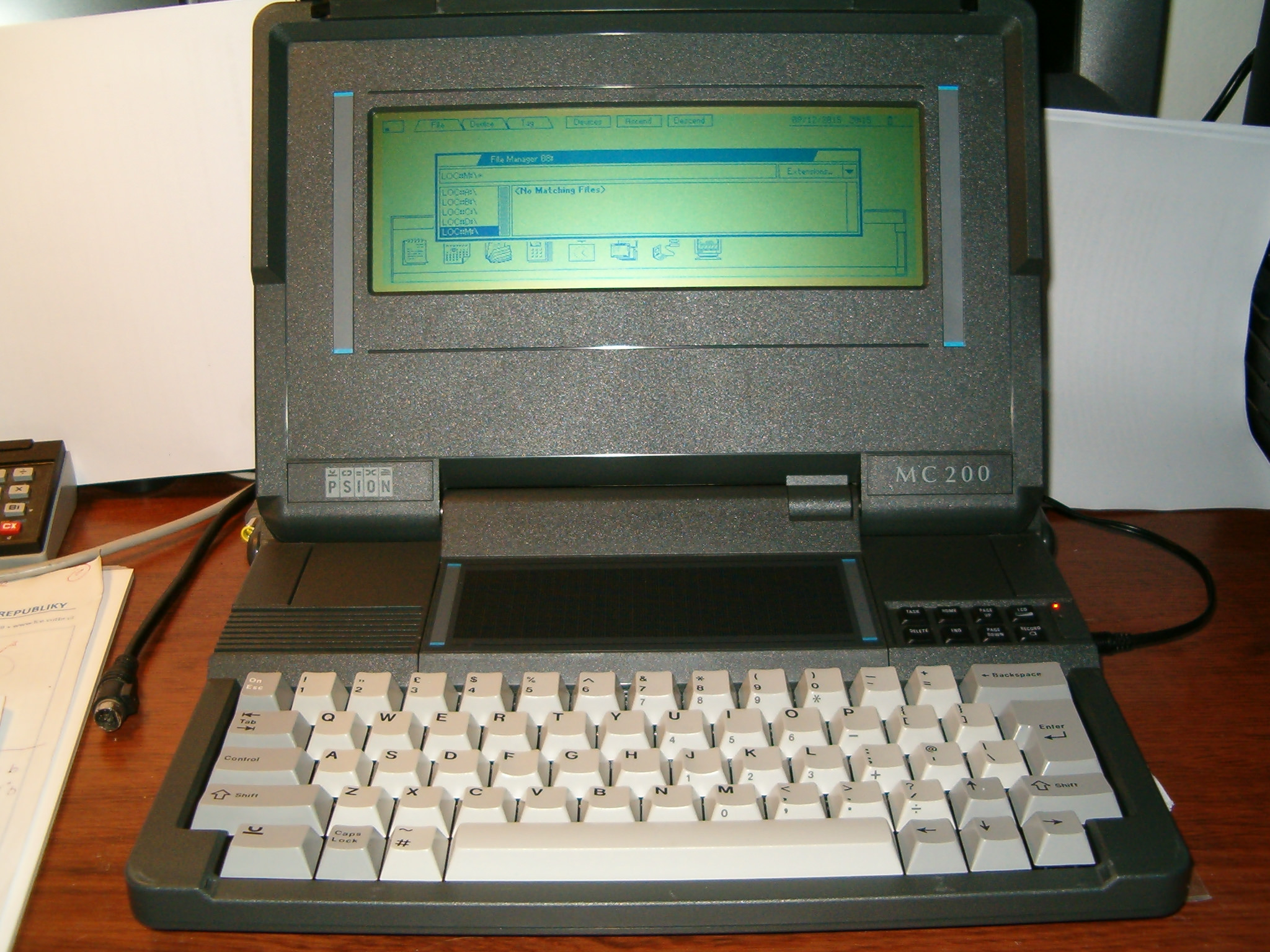
- A Psion MC 200
- Developer: Psion PLC
- Manufacturer: Psion PLC
- Type: Laptop
- Generation: 4
- Released: 26 September 1989; 37 years ago
- Lifespan: 1989–1991
- Introductory price: £845 (equivalent to £2,236 in 2025)
- Discontinued: 1991; 35 years ago
- Media: Psion Solid State Disks
- Operating system: EPOC16 (SIBO) or MS-DOS
- CPU: Intel 80C86, 7.7 MHz
- Display: 640 × 400 pixel monochrome LCD (640 × 200 pixel on MC 200)
- Input: QWERTY keyboard Numeric keypad
- Camera: N/A
- Touchpad: Yes, absolute
- Connectivity: Serial, 19,200 bit/s RS-232C
- Power: 8 × AA battery or 12V AC adapter
- Dimensions: 31.4 cm × 27.7 cm × 4.9 cm (12.4 in × 10.9 in × 1.9 in)
- Weight: 2.2 kg (4.9 lb)
- Language: Open Programming Language

The Psion MC (Mobile Computer) series is a line of laptop computers made by Psion PLC and launched in 1989.

== History ==
Developed by Psion towards the end of the 1980s, informed by market research about the mobile computing needs of potential customers in the 1990s, the MC 400 was introduced in late 1989: an approximately A4-sized laptop or notebook computer featuring a full-size keyboard, 600 x 400 pixel monochrome liquid-crystal display and a multitasking, multi-window graphical user interface, providing a number of built-in applications in ROM. Instead of a mouse, the computer provided a touchpad to interact with the user interface. This was uncommon in 1989: the Gavilan SC was the only widely known model with a touchpad, and they were not used again until years later.

Alongside the MC 400, the lower-specification MC 200 and MS-DOS-compatible MC 600 were announced in late 1989, with the latter scheduled for a March or April 1990 launch. The MC 200 had a "half-size screen" with a 640 x 200 resolution, thus maintaining the same pixel density as that on the MC 400, merely reducing its height, and halved the internal RAM from 256 KB to 128 KB. Such reductions in the specification led to a lower price of £545 plus VAT. Meanwhile, the MC 600 offered 768 KB of RAM (of which only 640 KB was accessible) and a 1 MB RAM drive (acting as "drive C") in order to offer a viable DOS experience and thus raising the price to £1,495 plus VAT, with the display on this model providing CGA-compatible graphics support at a 640 x 200 resolution, albeit in monochrome. Unlike the other models, the touchpad was dropped from the MC 600, with a function key bar introduced in its place.

EPROM storage was used to hold the built-in applications, and data storage involved "matchbook-size" solid-state modules employing flash memory fitting into the four available slots present on the sides of the machine. Such modules were initially available in 128 KB, 256 KB and 512 KB capacities, with 1 MB modules anticipated in 1990, 2 MB in 1991, and as much as 8 MB envisaged by Psion. ROM-based modules were intended to provide additional software. An external 1.44 MB floppy disk drive was also announced, along with a fast serial link specifically for the MC 600 - Laplink - that permitted the MC to communicate with a personal computer and access its storage (and for the PC to access the MC's storage in a similar fashion). An external solid-state drive for up to four modules was also announced as a PC peripheral.

An optional "voice processor" was announced for the MC series, plugging into the expansion slot of the machine and offering voice recording and playback support, with the audio being compressed and stored on disk, achieving the storage of a claimed eight minutes of speech in only 64 KB. The quality of the recorded speech was described euphemistically as "not brilliant", but "perfectly intelligible" and "quite adequate for note taking and interviewing".

The MC 400 was of the same generation as the Psion Series 3, and could be programmed using OPL much like the Series 3. Unlike the Series 3, the MC 400 has 4 bays for removable solid-state disk drives compared to 2 on Series 3 devices. The serial port also provides PC connectivity if used with the separately available PsiWin software using the lead designed for the Series 3 or 3A.

== Reception ==
The newly developed EPOC16 (SIBO) operating system allowed hot swapping of the flash memory cards in the 4 memory slots, and with the two hardware expansion slots, the device seemed ready for all future developments. But it turned out differently. For one, the prices were quite high, with the MC200 at £595 (equivalent to £1,574 in 2025), MC400 at £696 (equivalent to £1,842 in 2025), and MC600 at £1295 (equivalent to £3,427 in 2025), and the memory cards were very costly. Also, the software was not yet fully developed for market launch: the word processing was disappointing, the Open Programming Language (OPL) was adopted almost unchanged from the Organizer II and did not support the graphics abilities of the device, and professional developers had to wait over a year for the software development kit (SDK). The announced voice compression module was never finished, and apart from a parallel port, there were no hardware enhancements. Further, the press accused the device of incompatibility with the then standard IBM PC compatibles. Sales were weak, and SIBO Version 2, released in 1990 as a free update, changed nothing, although it came up with a Microsoft Word-like word processor and a significantly improved OPL version.

Competitors to the MC were pocket PCs such as the Atari Portfolio and Poqet PC, along with portable PCs, although in contrast to the latter the MC was "a genuine laptop" and "unlike most portable computers... really is light enough to carry around with you". The screen was described as "excellent quality, readable from a wide range of angles", although it was not backlit and, when reviewed in the context of Psion's later MC 600 model, was regarded as uncompetitive with backlit screens in poorly lit environments. One benefit of omitting a backlight and in using solid-state storage was reduced power consumption and thus longer battery life. Psion claimed up to 60 hours of continuous use on 8 AA battery cells for the MC 400 and 75 hours for the MC 200, with 30 hours claimed for the MC 600, although 20 hours were reported using alkaline batteries (and 12 hours using nickel-cadmium battery cells). A 12V external power supply could also be used.

The built-in applications at launch consisted of a simple text processor, a calculator, a terminal emulator, a diary, a simple "card index" database, and an alarm manager. The text processor was regarded as "a bare-bones affair", permitting limited text styling and margin adjustments, with paragraph formatting needing to be done manually, with the presumed emphasis of the program being on the preparation of text for later transfer to another system for formatting and printing. Psion planned a "proper word processing program" for release in 1990, depending on demand, and Psion subsequently made such software available. In 1993, the Psion MC Word product - a package of the MC 400 with a "fully featured word processor that's compatible with Microsoft Word" - was advertised, priced at £395 inclusive of VAT, with separate spreadsheet and spell checker plus thesaurus packages also available.

Initial reactions were positive, with one describing the MC 400 as "a very good machine and as a top-end organiser it's a winner", but reservations were expressed at the lack of "more serious software" that would take advantage of the "super screen and keyboard". Some commentators welcomed the apparent simplicity of the MC 400, noting that the laptop market had embraced colour displays, CD-ROM drives, and in attempting to deliver a desktop-like experience had sacrificed battery life and robustness. One praised "the MC-400’s 50-hour battery life, its near-perfect keyboard and its amazing durability" and claimed that in seven years of ownership, only Amstrad's NC100 and NC200 "has come close to producing anything better in terms of fitness for purpose".

== Summary of models ==
Psion MC 400
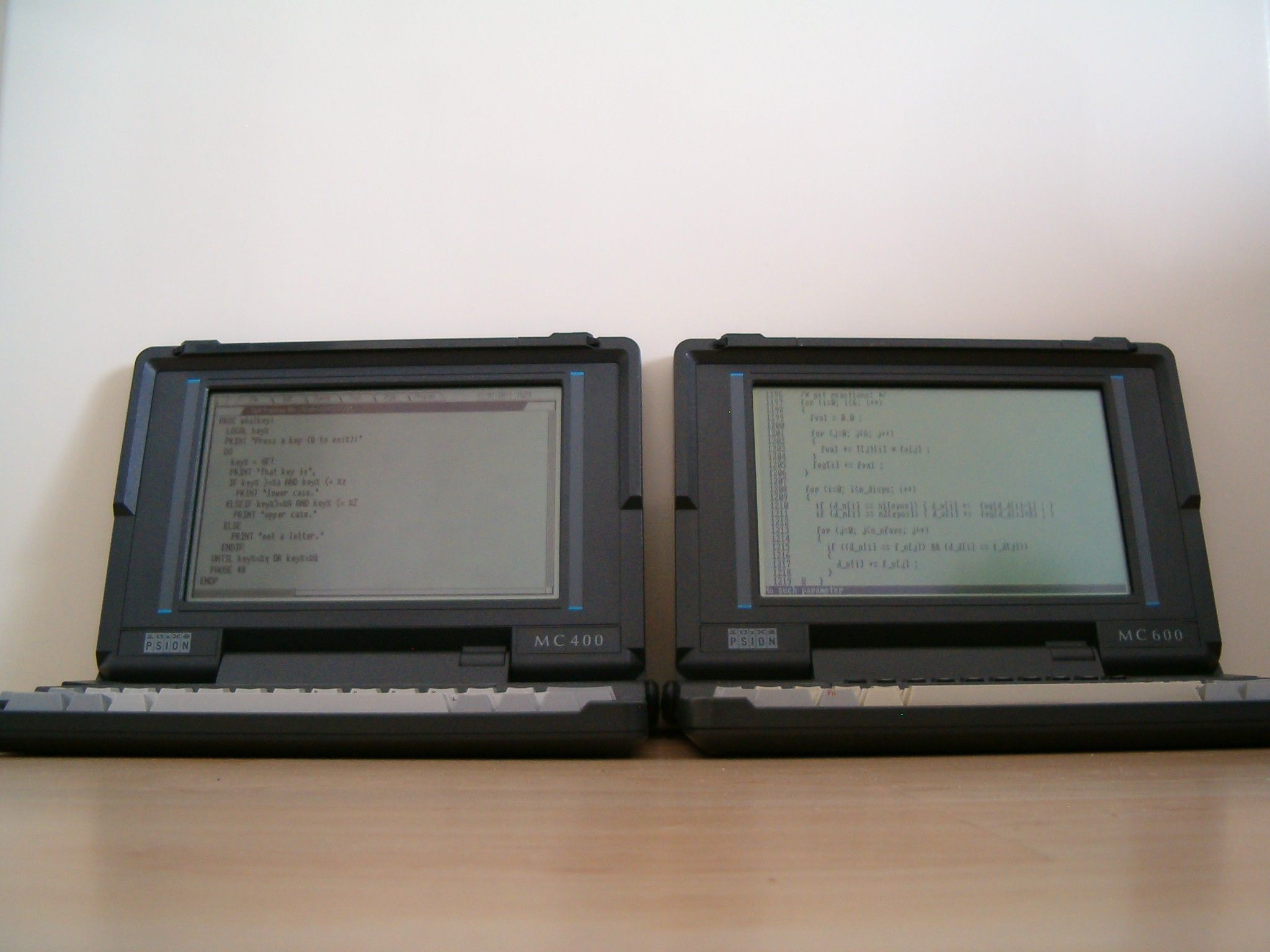
- Psion laptops - MC400 and MC600
- Manufacturer: Psion PLC
- Released: 26 September 1989; 37 years ago
- Discontinued: 1991; 35 years ago
- Media: Psion Solid State Disks
- Operating system: SIBO (EPOC16)
- CPU: Intel 80C86 processor @ 7.68 MHz
- Memory: 256 KB
- Display: 640 x 400 monochrome LCD
- Connectivity: Serial port
- Power: 8 × AA battery

Model	Memory (RAM)	Display resolution	UK retail price at launch (excluding VAT)	Estimated battery life
MC 200	128 KB	640 x 200	£595	75 hours
MC 400	256 KB	640 x 480	£845	60 hours
MC 600	768 KB (1 MB RAM disk)	640 x 200	£1,495	30 hours
