= Human Killing Machine =

1989 video game

- Developer: Tiertex
- Publisher: U.S. Gold
- Designer: Mark Haigh-Hutchinson
- Composer: Mark Tait
- Platforms: ZX Spectrum, Commodore 64, Amstrad CPC, Amiga, Atari ST MS-DOS
- Release: March 1989
- Genre: Fighting
- Mode: Up to 2 players simultaneously

Human Killing Machine (unofficially known as Street Fighter 2: Human Killing Machine or by the acronym H.K.M.) is a 2D fighting video game. The game was developed by British company Tiertex, who hired external team Blue Turtle (Nick Pavis and Leigh Christian) to produce the graphics, and published by U.S. Gold, released in March 1989. It was touted as a sequel to Tiertex's home computer conversion of Street Fighter (as the two companies later did with Strider II). It was released for 8-bit and 16-bit home computer formats.

== Gameplay ==
The player must defeat computer controlled characters from around the world in round-based one-on-one combat. The game is based on the engine from each system's Street Fighter port, with the time limit removed, and an energy recovery system.

=== Characters ===
The following characters are featured in the game:

Kwon (권): A martial artist hailing from Korea. He is the game's protagonist and the only character the player can control. He fights opponents from all over the world to become the world champion.
Igor (Игорь): A uniformed fighter from the Soviet Union. He carries a hunting rifle and uses it as a melee weapon. He fights in front of Saint Basil's Cathedral.
Shepski (Шепски): Igor's black dog.
Maria: A blonde prostitute in a bikini from the Netherlands. The player fights her in De Wallen, the red light district of Amsterdam.
Helga: Similar to Maria, but she is bigger and stronger and wears a dress.
Miguel: A matador from Spain.
Brutus: A bull also hailing from Spain.
Franz: A waiter from Germany. He attacks the player by throwing wine bottles at him.
Hans: Also from Germany. He sports a pair of lederhosen.
Sagan (سـَجـَن): An Arab terrorist from Beirut. He wears a keffiyeh.
Merkeva (ميركافا from Hebrew מרכבה): The final boss of the game, also a terrorist from Beirut. He is very tall and muscular and has a missile strapped to his back.

== Reception ==
Reception

Review scores
| Publication | Score |
|---|---|
| Amstrad Action | 65% |
| Crash | 73% |
| Sinclair User | 78% |
| Your Sinclair | 7/10 |
| Zzap!64 | 31% |
| The Games Machine | 70% |
| ACE | 568 |

At the time of release, the ZX Spectrum version of the game was generally well received, scoring 9/10 for graphics in Your Sinclair, who added "Possibly because of the memory used for the excellent background graphics and big - nay, hooge - sprites, the range of moves available in battle seemed relatively limited. It was, however, still fairly easy to beat opponents". The game scored 78% overall in Sinclair User, who summed it up with "backgrounds are static, but detailed... main graphics are nicely animated with slick arm and leg movements - maybe the best I've seen in this sort of game. The graphics may even be slightly better [than Street Fighter]". The 73% review in Crash stated "The scenery's really beautiful and the large characters are well drawn and animated", and stated it was "lacking in originality, but still very addictive".

Other versions did not fare as well. Zzap!64 said of the Commodore versions "repetitive with little skill involved", and gave the game 31%. Maff Evans, a secondary reviewer in the magazine said it was "an incredibly weak program and one of the worst fighting games I've ever seen". Amstrad Action listed HKM and Street Fighter as "some of the most dreadful arcade conversions on the CPC".

The Spanish magazine Microhobby valued the game with the following scores: Originality: 40% Graphics: 90% Motion: 80% Sound: 50% Difficulty: 70% Addiction: 80%

Retrospective reviews of the game were more negative. YouTuber Stuart Ashen featured the Atari ST version of the game on his web series, Terrible Old Games You’ve Probably Never Heard Of, criticizing the shoddy mechanics, jerky control scheme and frame rate, unfair difficulty, poor graphics, lack of sound effects and animation frames, stereotypical characters, and overall lack of improvement from Tiertex's conversion of Street Fighter.
