= The Train Game =

1983 video game

- Developer: Microsphere
- Publisher: Microsphere
- Platform: ZX Spectrum 16K
- Release: EU: 1983
- Genre: Simulation / Puzzle
- Mode: Single-player

The Train Game is a simulation video game originally published by Microsphere for the ZX Spectrum in 1983.

== Gameplay ==
The player assumes the role of a chief operations manager at a railway. Two different track layouts are included, A and B, each viewed from overhead on a single screen. Trains must be kept running by operating switches to avoid derailment. To score points, trains must stop at stations to pick up passengers. The player selects a level of play, which determines the number of trains running, and for every 25 passengers picked up, the sub-level increases by one. If passengers are kept waiting too long, they become angry and do not increase the player's score. Up to three trains may be running on the network, and passengers are colour-coded indicating which train they wish to board.

Each switch is designated a letter of the alphabet, corresponding to the keyboard key the player must press to switch it. Track A has 25 points, and track B has 19. While the player may pause the action to consider which points to switch, doing so decreases the score.

Occasionally, goods trains will enter the network, and must be directed back the way they came.

== Reception ==
The Train Game was critically well received. Sinclair User described it as original, well-thought-out and full of action. ZX Computing considered the game to be an excellent example of what the 16K Spectrum is capable of, requiring skill and practice to navigate even one train. It was suggested that a training track with eight switches should have been included. CRASH observed that The Train Game was "simple in idea, but sophisticated in its details", with the player required to rapidly check the switches each train is approaching, while also considering the needs of the waiting passengers. The graphics were highlighted as "cute and to the point", and overall a review score of 75% was awarded.

Criticisms of the game included repetitive sound effects and the indistinct letters used for switch designation.

In 1991, The Train Game was ranked at number 95 in Your Sinclair's Official Top 100, which highlighted the game's balanced difficulty curve and tendency to put the player under pressure. The list's compiler, Stuart Campbell, later championed the game for its requirement of "complex spatial awareness, fast reactions and multiple forward planning", comparing it with Typing of the Dead (1999).

Track layout B
