= Challenger (video game) =

1985 video game

- Japanese box art
- Developer: Hudson Soft
- Publisher: Hudson Soft
- Composer: Takeaki Kunimoto
- Platforms: Famicom, Game Boy Advance, mobile phone
- Release: JP: October 15, 1985
- Genres: Action, platform
- Mode: Single-player

Challenger (Note: Japanese: チャレンジャー, Hepburn: Charenjā) is an action-platform video game developed and published by Hudson Soft for the Famicom in 1985.

== History ==
Challenger was originally planned as a port of the ZX Spectrum video game Stop the Express (later released for the Commodore 64 and MSX), which was released by Sinclair Research Ltd in 1983. Stop the Express only contained the first train level, and three levels were added for the release of Challenger. The game's title screen displays the slogan "Realtime Action Adventure".

The game is uniquely constructed, where the levels consist of a side-scrolling platform game, a top-view scrolling shooting game, and a fixed-screen action game. The game was also unique for its 100-screen map, which was extensive for its time. The game has been re-released as a mobile phone application, and was made available on the Nintendo Wii Virtual Console for 500 Wii Points in May 2007 and the 3DS Virtual Console in March 2013. The game was also coupled with Milon's Secret Castle (Meikyū Kumikyoku (迷宮組曲) in Japan) and released for the Game Boy Advance as part of Hudson Best Collection Vol. 3 Action Collection compilation in December 2005. A Mobile version was released in 2005 with several changes in gameplay.

== Plot ==
The title character, Challenger, is an archaeologist who seeks to rescue the princess, Maria, from the hands of the evil boss, Don Waldorado, in a place called Pleasio Land. The setting of the character as an archaeologist is a homage to the Indiana Jones franchise, while his name may be an allusion to Conan Doyle's Professor Challenger (best known for his appearance in The Lost World).

The scene in the first level where the princess is taken away by the villain is programmed as part of the level, and it is impossible to catch up to the princess no matter how quickly the player progresses. The background music for this level is an arranged version of the well-known military march by Franz Schubert.

== Gameplay ==
The player controls the main character, Challenger, and must head towards the goal in each level. The player can attack by throwing knives, but some enemies cannot be damaged this way, and require a power-up item or the assistance of a hidden character to defeat. In levels 1, 3, and 4, touching any of the enemies results in a loss. The player can jump in the side-scrolling scenes, and can also duck by pressing down on the keypad in the first level. The player will also fall off the train and lose if they throw a knife while they are on the connecting area between train cars.

A life gauge is used only during the second level. The player receives damage whenever they touch enemies, and loses only when their life gauge reaches zero. There is no jump button for the top-view level, but the player can venture across the island to search for items. A timer is displayed on the upper left corner of the screen during all of the levels, and the player also loses a life when this timer reaches zero. Falling from very high places or getting caught in traps also results in a loss, and the player is taken to the game over screen when there are no lives remaining.

=== Difficulty ===
The player can also choose the difficulty from 16 different settings on the title screen. The number of enemies decreases for lower difficulty settings, but the player must defeat certain special enemies in order to gain items required to complete some levels. The decreased number of enemies on the lower difficulty settings actually makes it harder to finish the game. Therefore, the lowest difficulty setting is not necessarily the easiest.

=== Levels ===
Screenshot of the "Stop the Express" level in Challenger

The first level (or "scene") is titled "STOP THE EXPRESS!". The villain, Don Waldorado, has abducted Princess Maria, and is escaping on a special express train. Challenger heads for the front train car while avoiding Waldorado's cronies, but Waldorado cuts off the connection between the rear train cars and escapes after pushing Challenger off the train.

The second level is titled "SEARCH PRINCESS!". Challenger arrives at Waldorado island in search of the princess, and ventures through an extensive 4-directional scrolling game map. Entering certain caves or buildings allows the player to advance to the third and fourth levels, but others may be dangerous trap zones which can cause instant death.

The third level is titled "GET KEYWORD!". The princess is now being held captive in a pyramid, and Challenger must gather the three keyword items (a key, a ring, and a crown) that are spread throughout the third level in order to enter the pyramid. The level takes place in the inside of a cave, where Challenger must use the gushing fountains of water as steps to cross over to the other side. There are several entrances to level 3 located on Waldorado island, so the player can head for the pyramid by going back and forth between the second and third levels.

The fourth and final level is titled "RESCUE PRINCESS!". Challenger arrives at the pyramid after collecting the three key items, and must jump across several dinosaur-shaped rocks to reach the top floor, where he will face Don Waldorado in the final battle. The player returns to the first level after the conclusion of the fourth level, and the difficulty increases by two settings.

== Mobile version ==
An i-appli mobile application version of Challenger was released on August 1, 2005 for cellphones supporting i-appli in Japan. The game is currently available on the EZweb network as well. There are two modes in the mobile version. A classic mode, which is identical to the Famicom version of the game, and the arranged mode, which features improved graphics and character design along with several changes in gameplay. The changes from the classic mode to the arranged version are as follows:

- The difficulty settings were decreased from 16 settings to 3 settings.
- Conversation scenes are shown in-between levels.
- Challenger has a life gauge for all of the levels, meaning he cannot die from a single hit.
- The level 2 game map was completely remade, and the player may view the map in the sub menu.
- Challenger can move diagonally for the top-view second level, and can throw knives while jumping in the three other levels. The jump-throw motion is required to defeat the arranged version's Waldorado.
- Waldorado is tougher and possesses several new attack patterns in the arranged version. Hitting Waldorado several times causes him to change color and fly, and the player must throw knives while jumping in order to hit him.
- An ending screen is added instead of the level-cycle loop of the classic version.
- A save option was added to both the arranged version and the classic version.
