= H.A.T.E. Hostile All Terrain Encounter =

1989 video game

H.A.T.E. Hostile All-Terrain Encounter
- Developer: Vortex Software
- Publisher: Gremlin Graphics
- Programmer: Costa Panayi
- Composer: Ben Daglish
- Platforms: Amiga, Amstrad CPC, Atari ST, Commodore 64, and ZX Spectrum
- Release: May 1989
- Genre: Shoot 'em up
- Mode: Single-player

H.A.T.E. Hostile All-Terrain Encounter is an isometric scrolling shoot 'em up similar to Sega's Zaxxon, developed by Vortex Software and released in 1989 for the Amiga, Amstrad CPC, Atari ST, Commodore 64, and ZX Spectrum.

== Gameplay ==
The game is set as a training simulator in the year 2320. Colonised sectors of the galaxy are under alien threat and the player must qualify on "Stripworld" in order to join the Galactic Fighter Pilots. The only goal is to survive until the end of each level, but extra lives for the subsequent level can be accumulated by collecting plasma cells occasionally left behind by destroyed enemies. The player alternates between an aeroplane and a tank as they progress through 10 levels.
