= Vortex Software =

Video game developer

- Industry: Software
- Founded: 1980s
- Founder: Costa Panayi and Paul Canter
- Products: Cosmos; Sinclair ZX81; ZX Spectrum
- Services: Video game developer

Vortex Software was a video game developer founded by Costa Panayi and Paul Canter in the early 1980s to sell the game Cosmos which Panayi had developed for the Sinclair ZX81. They converted the game to the ZX Spectrum, but due to the low sales of the ZX81 version they licensed the game to Abbex.

Luke Andrews, Costa's brother-in-law, and Crete Panayi, Costa's brother, became involved to handle the business affairs and advertising respectively. The company was based in Manchester.

In the summer of 1984, Mark Haigh-Hutchinson was offered a position and ported several of the games to the Amstrad CPC in addition to writing Alien Highway for the ZX Spectrum. Chris Wood and David Aubrey-Jones were also associated with Vortex as outside contractors.

The company produced several notable games for the 8-bit home computers of the period. Deflektor was also ported to the Amiga and Atari ST.

After the production of Hostile All Terrain Encounter in 1988, Costa spent the next two years deciding where he wanted to go. In 1990 Vortex was reborn with Costa, Mark and Luke and the intention to develop a game for the Amiga and Atari ST. They developed a much enhanced version of Highway Encounter in just three months, but failed to find a software publisher for the game, so it remained unpublished.

Several games achieved critical success, Tornado Low Level and Highway Encounter appearing in the "Your Sinclair official top 100", for example.

== List of games ==
=== ZX81 ===
- ZX81 Othello (1981)
- Word Mastermind (1981)
- Pontoon (1981)
- Crash (1981)
- Astral Convoy (1983)
- Serpent's Tomb (1983)

=== ZX Spectrum ===
- Cosmos (1982), Abbex Electronics
- Gun Law (1983)
- Android One: The Reactor Run (1983), Vortex Software
- Android Two (1983), Vortex Software
- Tornado Low Level (1984), Vortex Software
- Cyclone (1985), Vortex Software
- Highway Encounter (1985), Vortex Software
- Alien Highway (1986), Vortex Software
- Revolution (1986), U.S. Gold
- Deflektor (1987), Gremlin Graphics
- Hostile All Terrain Encounter (H.A.T.E.) (1989), Gremlin Graphics

=== Amstrad CPC ===
- Android One: The Reactor Run (1985)
- Android Two (1985)
- Highway Encounter (1985)
- Tornado Low Level (T.L.L.) (1986)
- Alien Highway (1986)
- Revolution (1986, published by U.S. Gold)
- Deflektor (1987, published by Gremlin Graphics)
- Hostile All Terrain Encounter (H.A.T.E.) (1988, published by Gremlin 1990, unfinished)

=== MSX ===
- Highway Encounter (1986)

=== Commodore C64 ===
- Highway Encounter (Pedigree Software, 1986, published by Gremlin Graphics)
- Deflektor (Gremlin Graphics, 1987, published by Gremlin Graphics)
- Hostile All Terrain Encounter (H.A.T.E.) (Gremlin Graphics, 1987, published by Gremlin Graphics)
