= Flight Simulation (Psion software) =

1982 video game

- Developer: Psion
- Publisher: Sinclair Research
- Designer: Charles Davies
- Platforms: ZX81, ZX Spectrum, Timex Sinclair 1000
- Release: May 1982
- Genre: Flight simulation
- Mode: Single-player

Flight Simulation is a flight simulation program written by Psion and marketed by Sinclair Research for the ZX Spectrum and ZX81 home computers.

In the United States, Timex Sinclair marketed the ZX81 version as The Flight Simulator for the American version of the ZX81, the Timex Sinclair 1000. It was also marketed as Flug-Simulation in Germany and Simulador De Vuelo in Spain.

== Gameplay ==
The program simulated the essential aspects of "a highly-manoeuvrable light aircraft" in flight. Despite the limitations of the ZX81, it offered a basic graphical view of the instrumentation and view through the front window, as well as navigational aids and a full-perspective moving view of the final runway approach.

== Reception ==
The ZX81 version received positive reviews. Popular Computing Weekly said "No words can do justice to this most elegant of programs ... You will not see a better games program till Psion create one for the Spectrum". ZX Computing called the program "superb", stating that it made "very good use of the power and the graphics of the ZX81".

The ZX Spectrum version also received good reviews at the time of its release in early 1983. Tony Bridge of Popular Computing Weekly said the program "the best of its type" and that the Spectrum version was even more stunning than the original. Malcolm Jay of ZX Computing said the program was superb but complained about the limited instructions, suggesting "would-be Spectrum pilots should obtain a book on flying from their local library". Eight years later Your Sinclair magazine considered that it had not dated well.

Both versions of Flight Simulation became the best selling program for their respective machines with the ZX81 version reaching number 1 in February 1983 and the Spectrum version reaching the top of the Spectrum charts in May. Both versions were still in their machine's top ten chart over a year later. David Potter, Psion's managing director, stated the game had sold around 250,000 copies in an interview in the January 1984 issue of Your Spectrum.

Main viewing screen on ZX81 version (left) and runway approach on ZX Spectrum version (right)
