= Tornado Low Level =

1984 video game

- ZX Spectrum cover
- Developer: Costa Panayi
- Publishers: Vortex Software; Ocean Software
- Designer: Costa Panayi
- Programmers: ZX Spectrum; Costa Panayi; Amstrad CPC; David Aubrey-Jones; Commodore 64; Simon Nicol
- Platforms: Amstrad CPC, Commodore 64, ZX Spectrum
- Release: 1984: Spectrum, C64; 1985: Amstrad
- Genre: Multidirectional shooter
- Mode: Single-player

Tornado Low Level (also known as T.L.L.) is a multidirectional shooter developed by Costa Panayi and published in 1984 by the company he co-founded, Vortex Software. The game was first released for the ZX Spectrum, then ported to the Amstrad CPC and Commodore 64. The player controls a Panavia Tornado fighter jet to destroy targets throughout the map. Tornado Low Level received positive reviews for the ZX Spectrum and Amstrad CPC versions by video game critics, both on release and in retrospective reviews. The game was also a commercial success, with the Spectrum version debuting at number three on Personal Computer Games' top fifty charts. Vortex released a sequel in 1984: Cyclone.

== Gameplay ==
Flying towards a target to destroy

The player controls a Panavia Tornado fighter jet and must manoeuvre the plane at low altitude in order to destroy targets on the landscape by flying low over them at high speed, while avoiding pylons, bridges, and other structures. Each target is represented as a small circle. After five targets are destroyed, new targets are placed in more difficult positions, such as on the water.

Before a level begins, the map of the area is shown, with the five targets being highlighted. Each level has a time limit, while the Tornado has a limited fuel supply. Running low on fuel and time causes a warning sound to be triggered. Landing on the airfield refuels the aircraft. The Tornado has two speeds. At high speed, it can travel to targets faster, but it uses fuel at a much greater rate. This is depicted graphically by the plane's wings being swept back. The screen displays a fuel gauge, altimeter, a map of the game, and the time the player has left.

In addition to moving on the left/right and up/down on the screen, the Tornado can change the height it is flying at. This movement is supported graphically by allowing the Tornado to fly underneath bridges, with the plane temporarily disappearing from view as it does so. Telephone lines can also be flown under in the same way. Additionally, when the Tornado flies over a building, its shadow "climbs" up the wall, again giving the illusion of a third dimension.

== Development ==
Tornado Low Level was developed by Costa Panayi and published by the United Kingdom-based company Vortex Software, co-founded by Panayi. Before getting into game development, he was a design engineer for British Aerospace. The idea for the game originated from the popularity of Psion's flight simulator program Flight Simulation. Panayi considered the game to be a "progression of the ideas" he had in his previous title Android Two. It was originally released for the ZX Spectrum in 1984. Publisher Ocean Software later acquired the rights to the game to release it for the Commodore 64. An Amstrad CPC version was also released, rewritten to use the full capabilities of the computer. The CPC version was programmed by David Aubrey-Jones.

== Reception ==
Reception

Review scores
Publication	Score
Amstrad Action	90%
Amtix	85%
Crash	81%
Computer and Video Games	9/10
Sinclair User	8/10
Computer Gamer	13/20

Upon release, Tornado Low Level was a commercial success, with the ZX Spectrum version debuting at number three on Personal Computer Games' top fifty charts. Both the ZX Spectrum and Amstrad CPC versions of the game received positive reviews from video game critics. Computer & Video Games called it the best flight game on the Spectrum. Bob Wade, writing for Amstrad Action, praised the game for its graphics and for having the fastest and smoothest scrolling on the Amstrad computer. A reviewer for Amtix also praised the scrolling, but criticized the graphics for looking "blocky". Crash noted a lack of instructions and indications of how to complete the game's objectives. Retrospective reviews were also positive. Peter Parrish, writing for Eurogamer, called it "gorgeous, absorbing and, despite the subject matter, surprisingly non-violent". Nick Thrope, writing in Retro Gamer, gave it praise for its entertainment value.

Jim Watson of ZX Computing listed it as one of the best games for the ZX Spectrum in 1984. The game was voted number ten in Your Sinclair's "Official Top 100 Games of All Time" list. Retro Gamer, meanwhile, ranked it as the eleventh best game for the Spectrum. In 1987, Wade listed it as one of the best games for the then two-year-old Amstrad CPC.

== Legacy ==
Vortex Software released a sequel, Cyclone, in 1984. The player flies helicopter to collect medical supplies in the middle of a cyclone phenomenon.
