= Psion (company) =

Software company in Canada

Psion PLC
- Type: Public
- Traded as: LSE: PON
- Industry: Computers
- Founded: 1980; 46 years ago
- Founder: David E. Potter
- Defunct: 15 June 2012
- Fate: Acquired by Motorola Solutions
- Headquarters: London, England
- Number of locations: Over 14
- Key people: John Hawkins, (Chairman); John Conoley (CEO); David Potter
- Products: Workabout Pro 3, NEO, Ikôn, Omnii XT10, EP10, 8500 Series vehicle mount devices
- Revenue: £170 million (2009)
- Number of employees: 900 (2010)
- Website: psion.com at the Wayback Machine (archived 2004-04-20)

Psion PLC was a designer and manufacturer of mobile handheld computers for commercial and industrial uses. The company was headquartered in London, England, with major operations in Mississauga, Ontario, Canada, and other company offices in Europe, the United States, Asia, Latin America, and the Middle East. It was a public company listed on the London Stock Exchange (LSE: PON) and was once a constituent of the FTSE 100 Index.

Psion's operational business was formed in September 2000 from a merger of Psion and Canadian-based Teklogix Inc., and was a global provider of solutions for mobile computing and wireless data collection. The Group's products and services included rugged mobile hardware, secure software and wireless networks, professional services, and support programs. Psion worked with its clients in the area of burgeoning technologies, including imaging, voice recognition, and radio-frequency identification (RFID). They had operations worldwide in 14 countries, and customers in more than 80 countries.

Formed in 1980, Psion first achieved success as a consumer hardware company that developed the Psion Organiser and a wide range of more sophisticated clamshell personal digital assistants (PDAs). Psion either closed or disposed of all its prior operations and then focused on rugged mobile computing systems. It withdrew from the consumer device market in 2001. Motorola Solutions announced in June 2012 that it had agreed to acquire Psion for $200 million.

== History ==
=== Beginnings (1980–1984) ===
Psion was established in 1980 as a software house with a close relationship with Sinclair Research. The company developed games and other software for the ZX81 and ZX Spectrum home computers, released under the Sinclair/Psion brand. Psion's games for the ZX Spectrum included Chequered Flag and Flight Simulation.

Early software releases for the ZX Spectrum included titles such as VU-Calc, VU-File and VU-3D, along with dozens of other titles.

The company name is an acronym standing for "Potter Scientific Instruments", after the company's founder, David Potter. The acronym PSI was already in use elsewhere in the world so "ON" was added to make the name unique. Potter remained managing director until 1999 and was chairman of the company until late 2009.

In early 1983, Sinclair approached Psion regarding the development of a suite of office applications for the forthcoming Sinclair QL personal computer. Psion were already working on a project in this area, and when the QL was launched in 1984 it was bundled with Quill, Archive, Abacus and Easel; respectively a word processor, database, spreadsheet, and business graphics application. These were later ported to DOS and made available for the IBM PC and ACT's Sirius and Apricot computers, collectively called PC-Four, or Xchange in an enhanced version. Xchange was also available for ICL's One Per Desk computer, which was based on the QL.

=== Psion Organiser (1984) ===
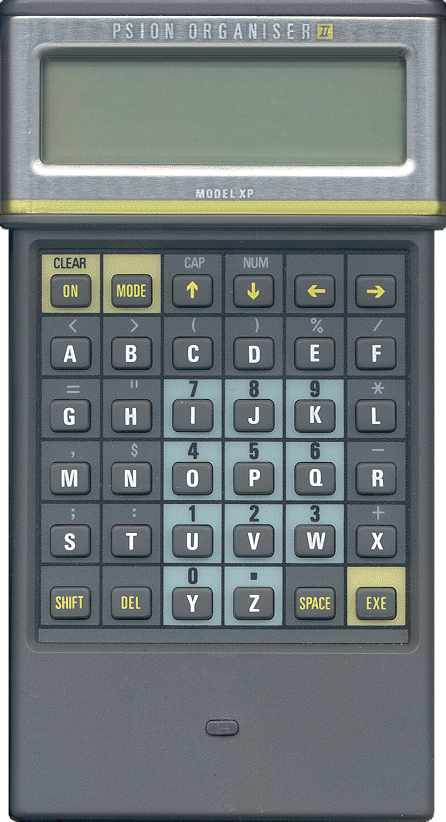
Psion Organiser II

In 1984, Psion first entered the hardware market with the Psion Organiser, an early handheld computer, in appearance resembling a pocket calculator with an alphanumeric computer keyboard. In 1986, the vastly improved Psion Organiser II was released, and was assembled by Speedboard Assembly Services. Its success led the company into a decade long period of Psion Computer and operating system development. It included the simple-to-use Open Programming Language (OPL) for database programming, which sparked a large independent software market.

=== EPOC (1987) ===
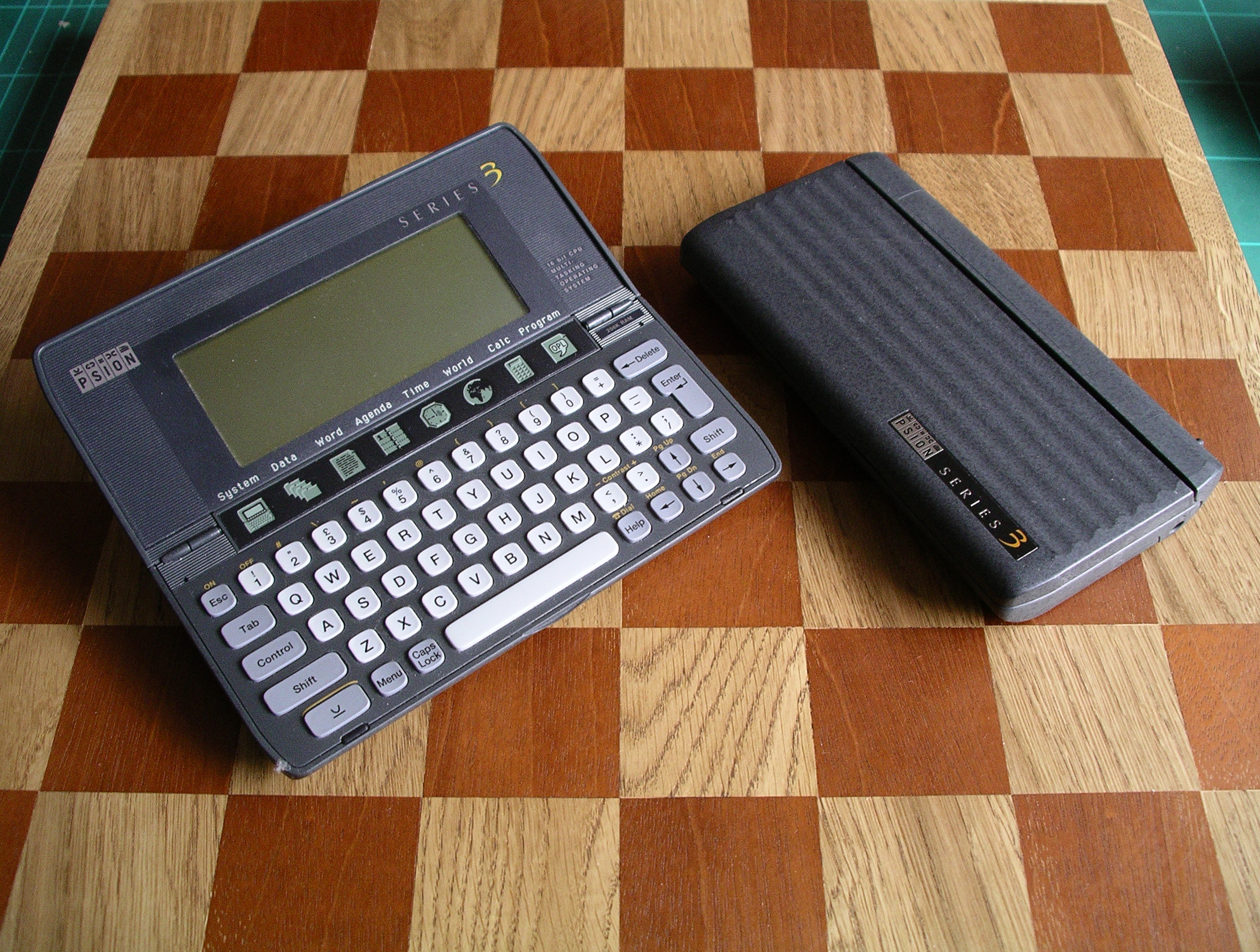
Psion Series 3

In 1987, Psion began developing its SIxteen Bit Organiser (SIBO) family of devices and its own new multitasking operating system named EPOC, to run its third generation product, Laptops (MC), industrial handhelds (HC and Workabout) and PDA (Series 3) products.

It is often rumoured that EPOC stands for "Electronic Piece Of Cheese" however Colly Myers, who was Symbian's CEO from founding until 2002, said in an interview that it stood for 'epoch' and nothing more. This development effort produced the clamshell QWERTY-based Psion Series 3 palmtops (1993–98), which sold in the hundreds of thousands, and the Psion MC-series laptops, which sold poorly compared to the DOS-based laptops of the era.

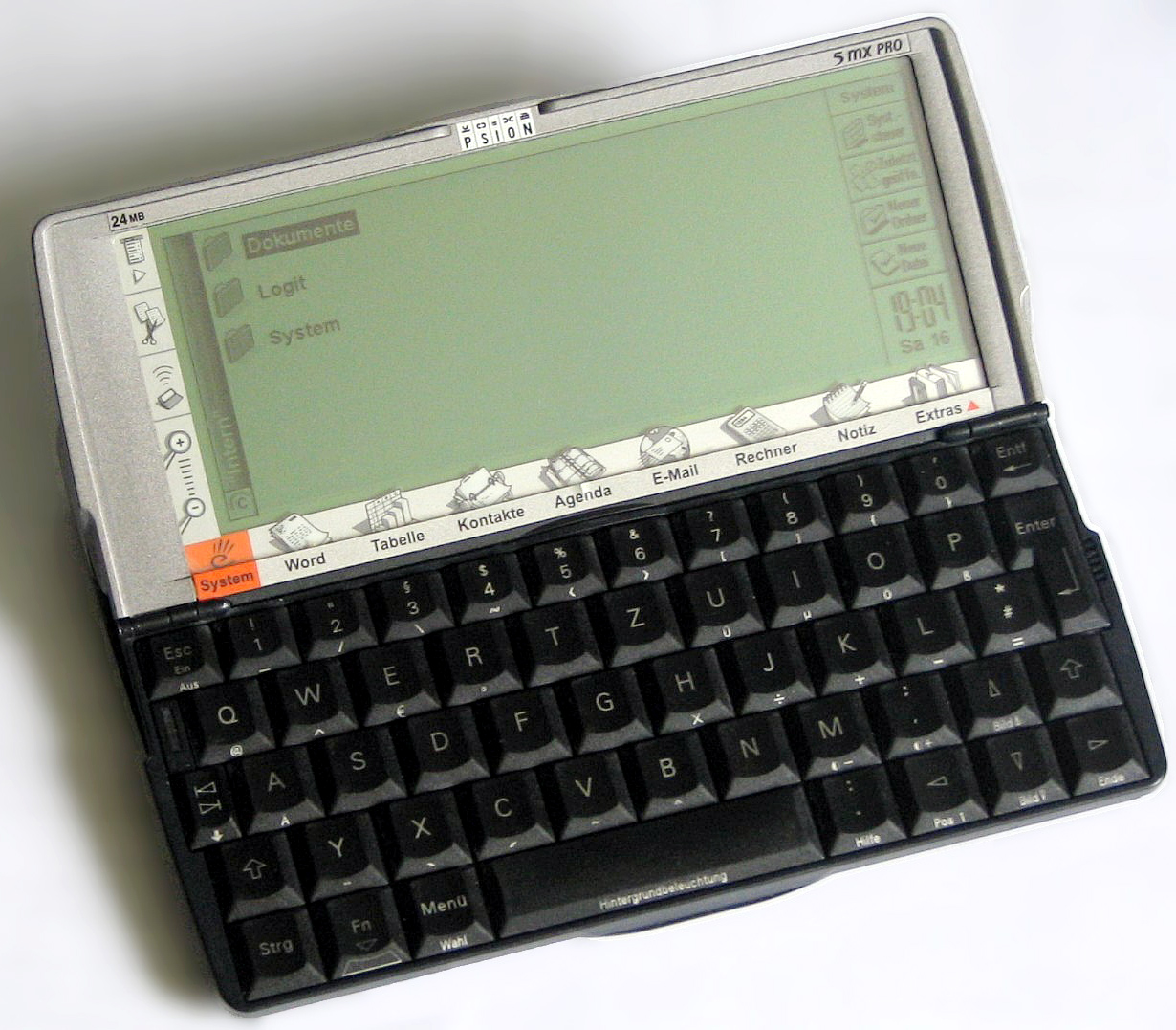
Psion 5mx Pro

A second effort, dubbed Project Protea, produced the Psion Series 5 for sale in 1997, a completely new product from the 32-bit hardware upwards through the OS, UI, and applications. It is still remembered for its high quality keyboard which, despite its size, allowed for touch-typing. However, the new feel of the product, and the removal of certain familiar quirks, alienated loyal Series 3 users, who tended to stick with their PDAs rather than upgrade.

In 1999, Psion released the Psion Series 7, which was much like a larger version of the Series 5, but with a double-size VGA-resolution screen that featured 256 colours (the Series 5 had a half-VGA screen with 16 grey shades). It was followed by the very similar Psion netBook.

Psion was being challenged by the arrival of cheaper PDAs such as the Palm Pilot, and PocketPCs running Microsoft's Windows CE, and in 2003, Psion released a Netbook Pro running Windows CE .NET 4.2 instead of EPOC.

=== Symbian and telephony (1998) ===
The 32-bit EPOC developed by Project Protea resulted in the eventual formation of Symbian Ltd. in June 1998 in conjunction with Nokia, Ericsson and Motorola. The OS was renamed the Symbian Operating System and was envisioned as the base for a new range of smartphones. Psion transferred 130 key staff to the new company and retained a 31% shareholding in the spun-out business. By 2007, the Symbian operating system powered around 125 million mobile phones, including many Nokia models and the Sony Ericsson P900 series.

Psion had previously sought to expand into mobile telephony itself, having engaged in talks to acquire Amstrad – mainly for its Dancall subsidiary – in 1996. Although Amstrad's owner and founder, Alan Sugar, had reportedly been seeking to sell the entire business, no agreement could apparently be made on a price or on "a plan for the disposal of the other parts of the Amstrad Group". This setback left Psion promising "to introduce GSM-based products during 1997". Meanwhile, Psion did license EPOC to Digital Equipment Corporation so that the system could be ported to Digital's StrongARM processor.

The development of new and updated products by Psion slowed after the Symbian spin-off. Other products failed or had limited success; these included Psion Siemens' GSM device, a Series 5 based set-top box, the Wavefinder DAB radio, and an attempt to add Dragon's speech recognition software to a PDA. Ericsson cancelled a Series 5MX derived smartphone project in 2001.

Psion had sold its sole manufacturing plant in 1999 and started to withdraw from its PDA markets in late 2001, shedding 250 of 1,200 staff and writing-off £40 million. The PDA, which was once a niche market, had become a global horizontal marketplace where it was difficult for Psion to compete. The final blow for Psion's Organiser and PDA business came in January 2001 when Motorola pulled out of a joint project with Psion, Samsung, and Parthus, to create "Odin", an ARM-based PDA-phone.

In 2000, Psion acquired Teklogix of Canada for £240 million, and merged its business-to-business division, Psion Enterprise, with the newly acquired company. Teklogix was rebranded Psion Teklogix, and this division formed the core of Psion Plc's business.

In 2002, Psion launched the Psion Software division. This business developed push email solutions for Symbian smartphones, Microsoft Exchange and Lotus Notes. This business was sold to Visto of the United States in 2003.

In 2004, Psion disposed of the company's remaining Symbian shareholding to Nokia, as it no longer regarded it as a core part of its strategy.

=== Last years (2010–2012) ===
In its last years, Psion made tailored and customized modular variants of its products through its online community, Ingenuity Working. Launched in March 2010, Ingenuity Working had more than 35,000 visitors per month within its first six months.

In January 2011, it launched a new logo, simultaneously removing Teklogix from its operating company name.

Motorola Solutions announced in June 2012 that it had agreed to acquire Psion for $200 million.

== Netbook trademark litigation ==
Psion registered the trademark Netbook in various territories, including the European Union and U.S. Trademark 75,215,401, which was applied for on 18 December 1996 and registered by USPTO on 21 November 2000. They used this trademark for the Psion netBook product, discontinued in November 2003, and from October 2003, the NETBOOK PRO, later also discontinued.

Intel started using the term netbook in March 2008 as a generic term to describe "small laptops that are designed for wireless communication and access to the Internet", believing they were "not offering a branded line of computers here" and "see no naming conflict".

In response to the growing use of the term, on 23 December 2008 Psion Teklogix sent cease and desist letters to various parties including enthusiast website(s) demanding they no longer use the term "netbook".

In early 2009, Intel sued Psion Teklogix (US & Canada) and Psion (UK) in the Federal Court, seeking a cancellation of the trademark and an order enjoining Psion from asserting any trademark rights in the term "netbook", a declarative judgement regarding their use of the term, attorneys' fees, costs and disbursements and "such other and further relief as the Court deems just and proper". The suit was settled out of court, and on 2 June 2009 Psion announced that the company was withdrawing all of its trademark registrations for the term "Netbook" and that Psion agreed to "waive all its rights against third parties in respect of past, current or future use" of the term.

Similar marks were rejected by the USPTO citing a "likelihood of confusion" under section 2(d), including 'G NETBOOK' (U.S. Trademark 77,527,311 rejected 31 October 2008), Micro-Star International's (MSI) 'WIND NETBOOK' (U.S. Trademark 77,580,272) and Coby Electronics' 'COBY NETBOOK' (U.S. Trademark 77,590,174 rejected 13 January 2009)

== Integration with Linux ==
Psion had a lengthy, but distant, interest in Linux as an operating system on its electronic devices. In 1998, it supported the Linux7K project that had been initiated by Ed Bailey at Red Hat, which was to port Linux to its Series 5 personal computer. The project was named after the Cirrus Logic PS-7110 chip of the Series 5. Although this project was one of the earliest attempts to port Linux to a handheld computer, it did not come to fruition for Psion. The project soon transitioned to an informal open-source software project at Calcaria.net that kept the name Linux7K. After the project transitioned again to sourceforge.net, the project's name was changed to a more general name PsiLinux, and later to OpenPsion. The project has developed Linux kernels and file systems for the Revo, Series 5 and 5MX, and Series 7 and netBook.

In 2003–4, Psion Teklogix and its founder David Potter expressed interest in Linux as the operating system for its devices as it divested from Symbian. However, the only result of that interest was Linux as the operating system on a limited number of custom NetBook Pros designed for a hospital setting.

The Embeddable Linux Kernel Subset project has produced a small subset of Linux that runs on Psion Series 3 PDAs.

== PDAs ==
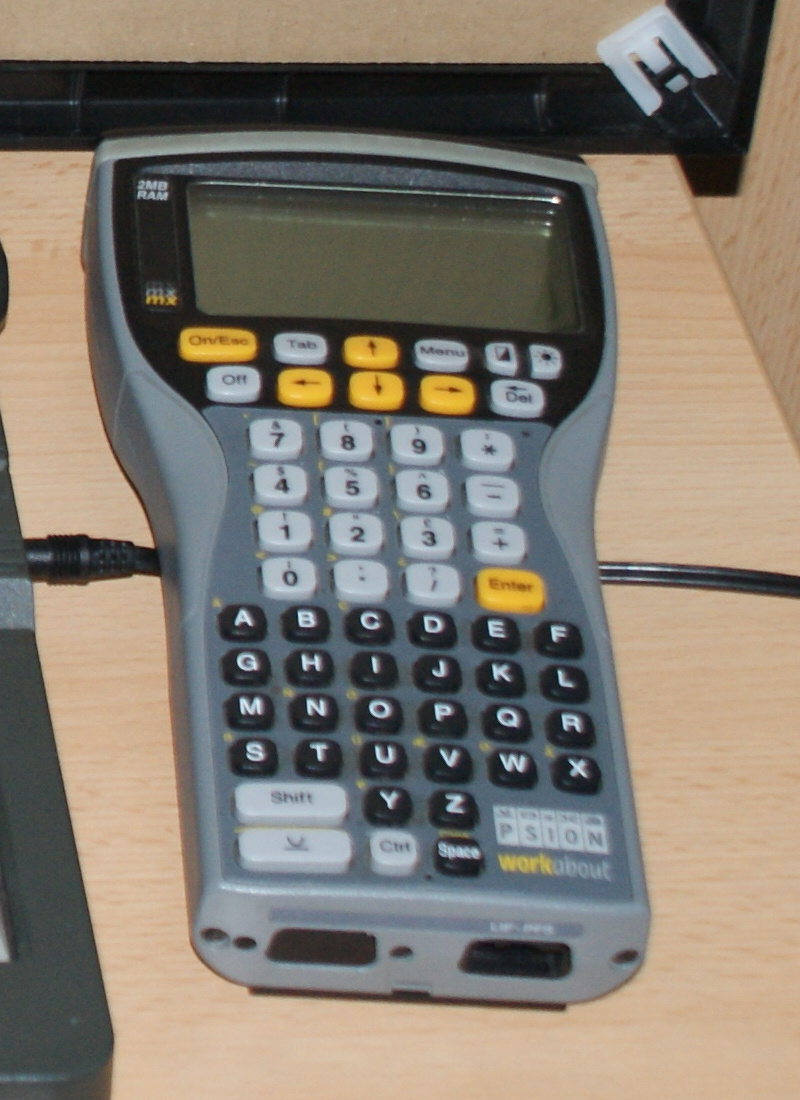
Psion Workabout

- Psion Organiser and Psion Organiser II
- Psion HC
- Psion Series 3, 3a, 3c & 3mx
- Psion Siena
- Psion Series 5, 5mx & 5mx Pro
- Psion Revo
- Psion netBook
- Psion Netpad
- Psion Series 7
- Psion Teklogix Netbook Pro (Windows CE)
- Psion Workabout
- Psion iKon

All these PDAs except the Psion netpad have a small keyboard, which excepting the Organiser, HC and Workabout was of the standard QWERTY layout, or a regional variation thereof.

== Laptops ==
- Psion MC 200
- Psion MC 400
- Psion MC 400 WORD
- Psion MC 600 (DOS)

== See also ==
- Gemini (PDA)
