= Microsphere (software company) =

British video game company

- Industry: Computer software
- Founded: 1982
- Founder: David Reidy, Helen Reidy
- Defunct: 1987
- Fate: Ceased trading
- Headquarters: London, England

Microsphere was a British software company formed in Muswell Hill, north London in 1982 by husband and wife team David and Helen Reidy, best known for several popular computer games in the mid 1980s.

== Company history ==
The company was formed in November 1982 as a consulting firm, before transforming into development the following year. The Reidys targeted the then recently released ZX Spectrum, and initially attempted to write business software, producing the Visicalc clone Omnicalc, but quickly realised that the future for the machine lay with games after their first effort, a cassette containing Crevasse and Hotfoot, received a good review in Sinclair User.

After recruiting local artist and family friend Keith Warrington, they released one of their best known and critically acclaimed games, Skool Daze in 1984, which sold 50,000 copies and Crash described as "excellent value, plenty to do, addictive, unusual" and followed it up with Back to Skool in 1985, which drew similar praise.

When interviewed, the Reidys said that they used no compilers or assemblers, and designed everything on pencil and paper, adding the raw, hand assembled Z80 machine code onto the computer. Warrington tried using a computer to design his graphics, but decided he preferred traditional methods on graph paper. The company never expanded, as the founders had no motivation to do so, and as time progressed, they found it increasingly difficult to cope with the more professional marketing campaigns that started to be introduced in the maturing computer game industry. In an interview, Helen Reidy said that "It seems they're [retail stores] more concerned with your advertising budget and the size of your box - it's very difficult to get a good game from a small software house into the large stores."

The company's last release was the detective adventure Contact Sam Cruise, which according to David Reidy wasn't commercially successful, blaming software piracy for lack of sales. Uninterested in developing for the emerging 16 bit computers and consoles, he decided to change careers and became an electrical engineer.

== Releases ==
- ZX-Sideprint (1983)
- Omnicalc (1983)
- Crevasse / Hotfoot (1983)
- The Train Game (1983)
- Evolution (1983)
- Wheelie (1983)
- Skool Daze (1984)
- Skyranger (1984)
- Back To Skool (1985)
- Contact Sam Cruise (1986)
