= VU-3D =

3D modelling software for the ZX Spectrum

- Developer: Psion Software Ltd
- Initial release: 1982
- Stable release: VU-3D for the T/S 2068 / 1983
- Operating system: ZX Spectrum, T/S 2068
- Type: 3D modelling
- License: Proprietary

VU-3D is a 3D modelling software package for the ZX Spectrum home computer. It was published by Psion Software Ltd in 1982.

Using simple commands, the user may create a solid object or set of objects in three-dimensional space, observe, modify, print and store such displays. VU-3D includes commands to allow the user, to move round the object and look at it from different distances and directions.

Object creation is done in wire-frame model display, with the possibility of defining a light source and rendering a shaded view.

The software was created by Jonathon, Chris Jacob and Martin Stamp under the supervision of Charles Davies. Along with VU-Calc and VU-File, it was part of Psion's productivity software suite.

In 1983 a Portuguese language translation was released by Timex Portugal, and a version for the Timex T/S 2068 was released by Timex Computer Corporation.
