= Stop the Express =

1983 video game

- MSX cover art
- Developer: Hudson Soft
- Publishers: MSX, X1; Honeybee Soft; ZX Spectrum; Sinclair Research Ltd
- Designer: Fumihiko Itagaki
- Platforms: Sharp X1, ZX Spectrum, Commodore 64, MSX
- Release: 1983
- Genre: Action
- Mode: Single-player

Stop the Express, also known as Runaway Express SOS (暴走特急SOS, Bōsō Tokkyū SOS) in Japan, is a video game developed by Hudson Soft and published in 1983. It was written for the Sharp X1 and later ported to the ZX Spectrum, Commodore 64, and MSX.

It was remade for Nintendo Family Computer as Challenger (チャレンジャー) in 1985.

== Gameplay ==
In Stage 1, the player runs along the top of an express train, jumping between carriages while avoiding enemy knives and obstacles. Halfway along the train, the player enters the train, and Stage 2 begins. The player must then proceed through the carriages, towards the front of the train, so that it can be stopped.

Upon the completion of each level, the game displays the Engrish message "Congraturation! You Sucsess!". The game then repeats from Stage 1, with more enemies. Enemies, known as "redmen", initially pursue from the rear on the roof of the train, and the front once inside, and will throw knives which the player must dodge by ducking under, or jumping over, them. In addition, once inside the train, the player can jump up and hang from the overhead straps out of the way of the redmen. However, ghosts flit up and down the carriages making it extremely dangerous to stay there too long. Once a few levels have been completed, redmen will approach from both front and rear.

The player has only two weapons at his disposal. When on the roof of the train, he can catch birds that fly overhead and then release them to run along the carriage and knock the redmen off, as well as high kicking them. Whilst inside, the high kick is the only option.

== Reception ==
Reception

Review scores
Publication	Score
Crash	80%
Sinclair User	8/10
Zzap!64	66%

Stop the Express was rated as the 4th best Spectrum game by Your Sinclair, in their list of the top 100 Spectrum games. Retro Gamer, meanwhile, ranked it as the twelfth best game for the Spectrum.

== Legacy ==
An NES/Famicom port was planned, but due to only having the first train level, three levels were added and became Challenger, which was released only in Japan.
