= Mark Haigh-Hutchinson =

English video game developer (1964 - 2008)

Mark Haigh-Hutchison
- Mark Haigh-Hutchinson
- Born: 20 August 1964; United Kingdom
- Died: 15 January 2008 (aged 43); Austin, Texas
- Occupation(s): Game designer and programmer
- Known for: Designer of several video games

Mark Haigh-Hutchinson (20 August 1964 – 15 January 2008) was an English video game developer. He is most notable for working on mid to late 1990s Star Wars titles, and the Metroid Prime games.

== Biography ==
Haigh-Hutchinson started his career at Artic Software, but moved to Vortex Software in 1984. In 1986, he left Vortex for Elite Systems, where he ported Paperboy to the Amstrad CPC. He then later worked at Tiertex. In 1989, he was hired by LucasArts, where he worked until 1999, mostly on Star Wars video games. Since 2000, he worked at Retro Studios, where he developed the camera system for the Metroid Prime series.

On 15 January 2008 Haigh-Hutchinson died in Austin, Texas after battling pancreatic cancer, at the age of 43. He is survived by his wife and two daughters.

== Works ==
=== Video games ===
- Android One: The Reactor Run (1984)
- Highway Encounter (1985)
- Alien Highway (1986)
- Revolution (1986)
- Paperboy (1987) - Amstrad CPC port
- Overlander (1988)
- Thunder Blade (1988)
- Human Killing Machine (1988) (a semi-official sequel to Street Fighter)
- Indiana Jones and the Last Crusade: The Action Game (1989)
- World Cup Italia '90 (1990)
- Magic Boy (1993)
- David Robinson's Supreme Court (1993)
- Star Wars: Rebel Assault (1993)
- Sam & Max Hit the Road (1993)
- Zombies Ate My Neighbors (1993)
- Big Sky Trooper (1995)
- Star Wars: Dark Forces (1995)
- Shadows of the Empire (1996)
- Star Wars: Rogue Squadron 3D (1998)
- Star Wars: Episode I Racer (1999)
- Metroid Prime (2002)
- Metroid Prime 2: Echoes (2004)
- Metroid Prime 3: Corruption (2007)

=== Books ===
- Real-Time Cameras (2008), Morgan Kaufmann, ISBN 978-0-12-311634-5
