= Back to Skool =

1985 video game

- ZX Spectrum cassette cover
- Publisher: Microsphere
- Designer: David Reidy
- Platform: ZX Spectrum
- Release: EU: 1985
- Genre: Action-adventure
- Mode: Single-player

Back to Skool is an action-adventure game that is a sequel to Skool Daze. It was made by David Reidy (whose wife Helen was a teacher at the time) with graphics by Keith Warrington for the ZX Spectrum and released by Microsphere in 1985. The gameplay is similar to - if more advanced than - Skool Daze, incorporating most of the same characters, elements, graphics and open world design.

The game is ranked 19th in the "Your Sinclair official top 100" Spectrum games of all time.

== Gameplay ==
In-game screenshot

The game differs from its predecessor by an increase in the size of the play area (including a neighbouring girls' school) and a number of gameplay changes.

The girls' school incorporates its own new characters including undistinguished girls with hockey sticks, Hayley (girlfriend of the main character Eric) and Miss Take (the headmistress). Only at break time and lunch time are the girls allowed to mingle with the boys, in the central grassy playground, separated by a high gate. The opening and closing of the gate is controlled by the school caretaker Albert, a new character to the game. It is also possible for Eric to sneak over the gate and enter the girls' school during lessons, either by using the bicycle (after completing the challenge of locating its lock combination and then performing a tricky manoeuvre on it), by watering the flower beside the gate and jumping on top of it, or by kissing Hayley through the gate. When the girls and boys are allowed to mingle and when Eric gains access to the girls' school, he can kiss Hayley, who will then agree to do 1000 of his lines for him. This reduction method can be used up to six times before Hayley refuses to help Eric any more.

Elements added in Back to Skool include stink bombs (used to trigger the opening of windows), water pistols (used to make the potted plants grow and spill water onto the teachers), mice that can be released in the girls' school causing widespread panic, and sherry (which can be squirted into cups and used to "intoxicate" teachers by splashing it on them with correct timing).

== Development ==
Back to Skool was programmed by David Reidy.

== Reception ==
Reception

Review scores
| Publication | Score |
|---|---|
| Crash | 93% |
| Computer and Video Games | 30/40 |
| Sinclair User | 5/5 |
| Your Sinclair | 9/10 |
| Computer Gamer | 4/5 |

Awards
| Publication | Award |
|---|---|
| Crash | Crash Smash |
| Sinclair User | SU Classic |
