= Android Two =

1983 video game

- Developer: Costa Panayi
- Publisher: Vortex Software
- Platforms: ZX Spectrum; Amstrad CPC
- Release: 1983: ZX Spectrum; 1985: Amstrad
- Genre: Shoot 'em up
- Mode: Single-player

Android Two is a shoot 'em up maze video game written by Costa Panayi and published by Vortex Software in 1983 for the ZX Spectrum and in 1985 for the Amstrad CPC. It is the sequel to Android One: The Reactor Run, released earlier in 1983.

== Gameplay ==
Gameplay screenshot

The aim of the game is to destroy five Millitoids – large worm-like creatures – which roam a white-walled maze. The maze is also filled with other enemies, landmines, trees and other features. The Millitoids are destroyed with three shots to the head. When all five are destroyed, the player moves onto the next of three mazes.

The maze is presented in a scrolling top-down view, using the same 3D effect Costa Panayi would later use in games like Tornado Low Level.

== Reception ==
Sinclair User found the graphics to be an outstanding feature, the 3D effect being novel for an early ZX Spectrum game. CRASH awarded 90% and was also impressed with the graphics. The reviewer also commented on the design of the maze, which includes both open spaces and tight corridors, challenging difficulty and the overall polished feel. Comparisons with 3D Ant Attack were made.
