= Skool Daze =

1984 video game

- Publisher: Microsphere
- Designers: David Reidy; Helen Reidy; Keith Warrington
- Platforms: ZX Spectrum, Commodore 64
- Release: 1984 (Spectrum); 1985 (C64)
- Genre: Action-adventure
- Mode: Single-player

Skool Daze is an action-adventure game released by Microsphere in 1984 for the ZX Spectrum and ported to the Commodore 64 the following year. It was written by David Reidy (whose wife, Helen, was a school teacher at the time) with graphics designed by Keith Warrington. The game was commercially and critically successful, and praised for its original concept. It has since been regarded as one of the pioneers of the open world sandbox game genre.

== Gameplay ==
The player assumes the role of a schoolboy named Eric whose objective is to steal his report card out of the staff room safe by accomplishing various tasks around the school. The computer controls all the other characters, including the headmaster, the teachers, and the pupils.

The four teachers are Mr Wacker (the headmaster), Mr Rockitt (the science teacher), Mr Withit (the geography teacher) and Mr Creak (the history master). Other than Eric, three of the pupils are named: Boy Wander (the tearaway), Angelface (the bully) and Einstein (the swot). The player has the option of renaming the characters before the game begins. There are also many unnamed, undistinguished pupils at the school.

If Eric is caught out of class or otherwise misbehaving, teacher characters pursue him and issue lines. When 10,000 lines or more are accumulated, the game ends with Eric's expulsion. However, Eric can also receive lines when something is not his fault, such as getting knocked to the floor or being nearest a teacher who has just been hit by a projectile fired by one of the other pupils. Part of the challenge in this game is to prevent other pupils from getting Eric into trouble.

== Background ==
Helen Reidy had a background in teaching, while David had fond memories of activities between lessons and designed the game around this. The pupils were based on schoolboy characters he read about as a child, including Just William and The Beano's The Bash Street Kids. He later clarified that "each of the rooms would look like a frame in a comic".

David Reidy considered himself to be more proficient as a programmer and engineer, and decided the game's graphics would benefit from a separate designer. He recruited a family friend, Keith Warrington, who was studying graphic design. Warrington learned the rudiments of computer graphics from David, and drew the characters as line drawings on squared paper. From this, he blocked in the individual pixels to create an appropriate sprite, with tracing paper to design the individual animation frames for each character. He later obtained a Spectrum to assist with the design, but found that using graph paper was easier. Warrington based the teachers on ones that had taught him at school, and later said the geography teacher, Mr Withit, was inspired by "my all time favourite teacher". He found the screen resolution limitations helpful, as it forced him to design cartoon-like characters, saying "you couldn't do a normal person because they would have all looked the same". As with other Microsphere games, David designed the program on paper, which Helen typed into the computer.

== Reception ==
Reception

Review scores
Publication	Score
Crash	93%
Computer and Video Games	34/40
Sinclair User	8/10
Your Sinclair	8/10
ZX Computing	8/10
Sinclair Programs	75%
Your Spectrum	3/5

Award
Publication	Award
Crash	Crash Smash

Skool Daze was a commercial success when first released, selling 50,000 copies despite very little marketing or promotion. Reidy later realised he could have made more money with an appropriate campaign, and regretted the loss of income due to software piracy, but was still happy that the game was profitable and covered costs.

The ZX Spectrum version was one of the Spectrum games listed in 1001 Video Games You Must Play Before You Die.

In 1985, Zzap!64 reviewed the Commodore 64 version which they found to be graphically and sonically weak, but enjoyable to play due to the innovative gameplay. It was given an overall rating of 78%.

The game has been recognised as being a pioneer of the sandbox game format, later used by Little Computer People and The Sims.

== Legacy ==
The game was followed by Back to Skool, which expanded the gameplay to include a neighbouring girls' school and a love interest (with the benefit of being able to reduce one's lines), in addition to stink bombs, mice, water pistols, frogs, sherry and a long-suffering caretaker.
