= SDI Technologies =

Consumer electronics manufacturer based in New Jersey, US

SDI Technologies is an American consumer electronics manufacturer based in Rahway, New Jersey, whose products are marketed under several national brands, including Timex, eKids, KIDdesigns, and iHome. SDI used to market under Soundesign, a now-defunct brand. SDI Technologies had 110 employees as of 2007, and has a distribution network that covers over 70 countries. Including Asia, SDI employs over 400 people.

== History ==
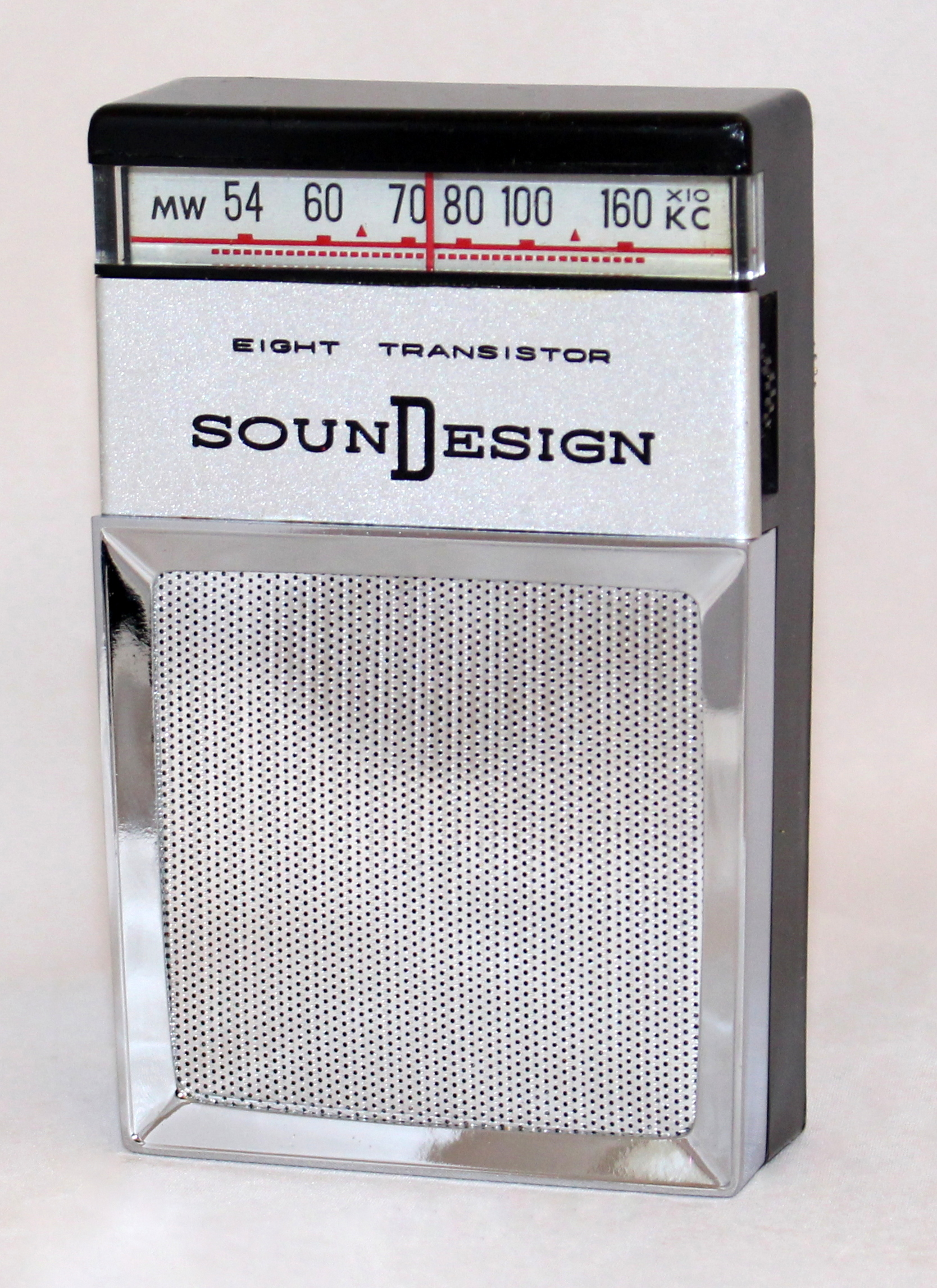
A Soundesign pocket transistor radio from the 1960s

SDI Technologies was founded as Realtone Electronics in 1956 by Saul Ashkenazi and Ely Ashkenazi. In that year, the company introduced a pocket cigarette lighter and a transistor radio, but neither one of the first. Realtone went public in 1961. It introduced the Soundesign brand of high-end audio components in 1963, and the company changed its name to Soundesign in 1968. Soundesign returned to being a privately-held company in 1982. The company was renamed again, this time to its current name, in 1994.

== Products ==
=== Soundesign ===
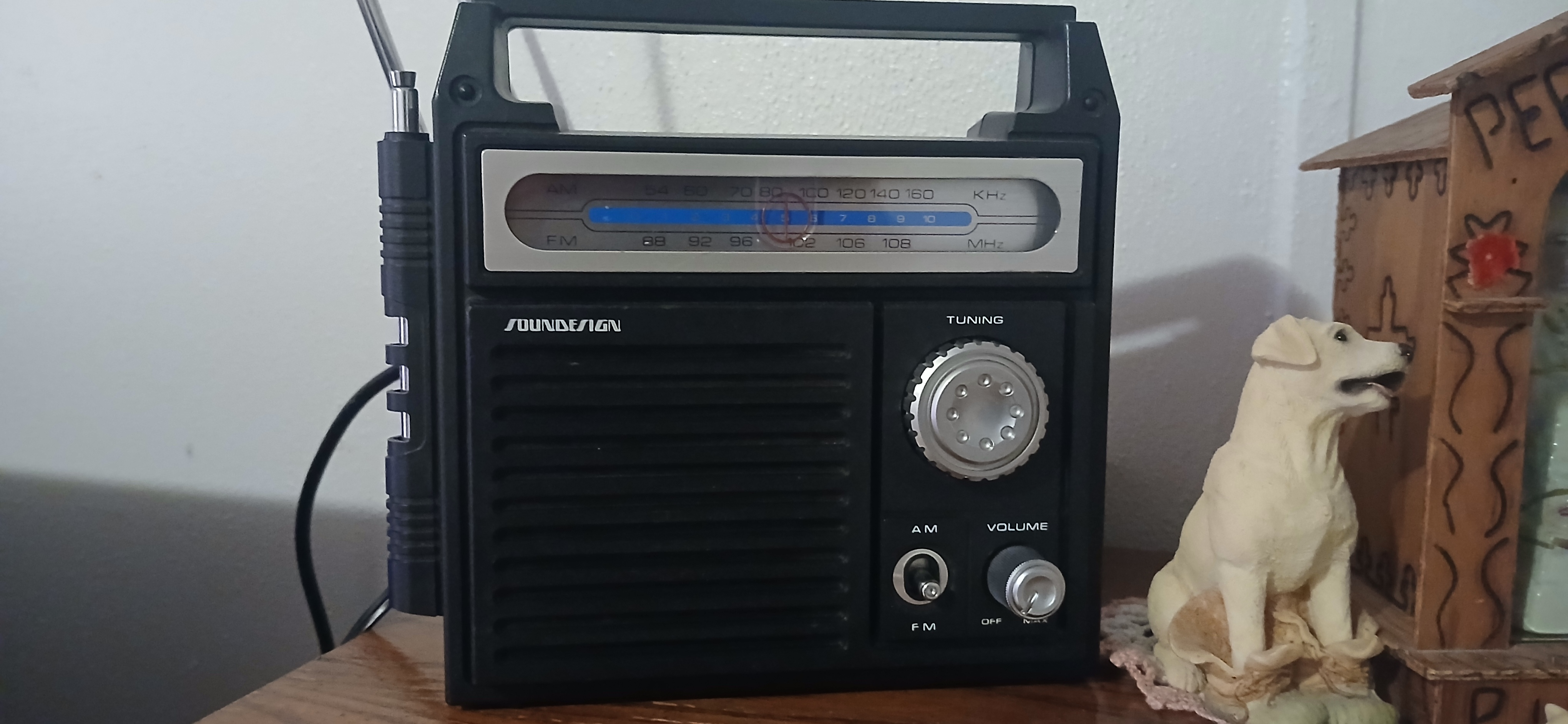
A soundesign 2244b radio

Soundesign, the defunct flagship division of SDI Technologies originally known as RealTone, marketed inexpensive home and portable electronics. The Soundesign brand faded as SDI began selling its products under the Zenith brand in 1993. The Realtone and Soundesign brands were reintroduced in 2012. SDI's current offerings include small electronics of the iHome and Timex brands.

Soundesign products included clock radios, portable radios, stereo systems, televisions, calculators and walkie-talkies In 1983 Soundesign launched the world's first stereo rack system, and the first clock radio with a telephone in 1983. A range of air filters and ionizers were sold under the brand Home Care by Soundesign.

=== KIDdesign ===
Soundesign launched its KIDdesign division in 1989 with Playskool youth electronics including electronic toys, earbuds, headsets and headphones. Licenses for Barbie were added in 1993, Hasbro in 2008 (Transformers, GI Joe, Littlest Pet Shop and My Little Pony), Disney in 2010, Marvel in 2013 (Hulk, Iron Man and Captain America), and Star Wars and Nickelodeon in 2014.

=== iHome ===
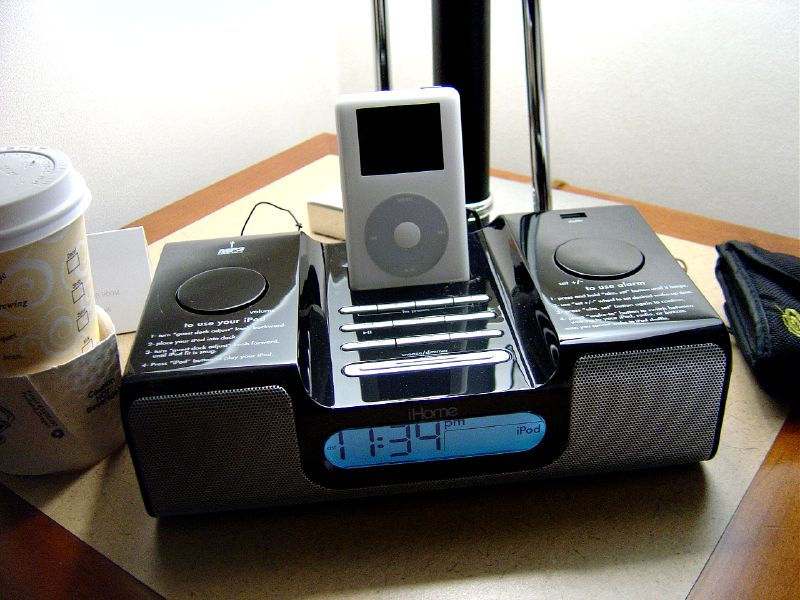
iHome Alarm Clock connected to a 4th-generation iPod

Created in 2005, the iHome division produces docking stations, headphones, smart home devices, and other accessories. iHome speakers are able to stream music over Apple AirPlay, Bluetooth, as well as via a wired connection. In addition to playing music wirelessly, some systems can act as a charging station for many devices when connected. Their compatibility ranges from smartphones, MP3 players, iPods, tablets, and many more. Some iHome accessories act as a docking station so that users with tablets can use a physical keyboard rather than the one provided on-screen with many devices. iHome also produces several smart home accessories such as smart outlets and motion detectors, which are compatible with Apple HomeKit, Samsung SmartThings, Wink, as well as others.

== List of products ==
=== Soundesign ===
Model	Product	Features	Year	Photo
33-03	Radio	ANM/FM/TV sound		
44-02	Portable Radio	AM		
335	Headphones			
338	Headphones			
477	Stereo System	8-track player, stereo		
495	Stereo System	Cassette recorder		
602	Portable Radio	MW		
TR-1053	Portable Radio	MW		
SD-1053	Portable Radio	MW		
SD 1094	Portable Radio			
1120C	Portable Radio			
1130	Portable Radio			
1133	Portable Radio			
1146	Portable Radio	AM	1982	
1152	Portable Radio	AM		
1164	Portable Radio	AM		
1177	Portable Radio	AM	1977	
1222C	Portable Radio			
1437	Portable Radio	AM		
1445B	Portable Radio			
TR-1820	Portable Radio	MW		
TR 2051	Portable Radio	AM/FM		
2052	Portable Radio	Portable FM stereo headphone radio		
2102	Portable Radio	AM/FM		
2145	Portable Radio	AM/FM		
2151	Portable Radio	AM/FM		
2207	Portable Radio	AM/FM		
2208D	Portable Radio	AM/FM		
2214B	Portable Radio	AM/FM	1977	
2215	Portable Radio	AM/FM		
2223D	Portable Radio	AM/FM		
2224	Portable Radio	AM/FM		
2229	Portable Radio	AM/FM		
2240	Portable Radio	AM/FM		
2244B	Portable Radio	AM/FM	1978	A soundesign 2244b radio
2256B	Portable Radio	AM/FM		
2260	Portable Radio			
2323	Portable Radio	AM/FM, stereo		
2413	Portable Radio	AM/FM/CB		
2448	Clock Radio	Portable, LCD alarm clock, AM/FM/TV sound/weather band		
2531	Portable Radio	AM/FM/VHF TV sound/VHF police/weather band		
2540	Portable Radio			
2549C	Portable Radio	SW/FM/UHF		
2660B	Portable Radio	AM/FM/UHF, TV sound		
2667	Portable Radio	AM/FM/Air/TV/Weather		
2673	Portable Radio	AM/FM/Marine/SW/Air/Police/Weather		
3011-(A)	Clock Radio	Portable, AM/FM, analog clock		
3120	Portable Radio			
3128W	Clock Radio	God bless prayer alarm clock		
3131L	Clock Radio	Wacky wake-up alarm clock		
3162G	Clock Radio	Jukebox alarm clock, Grease theme songs		
3163B	Clock Radio	Jukebox alarm clock, musical legends, British hits		
3340	Portable Radio	AM/FM		
3434B	Clock Radio			
3450	Clock Radio	Flip numbers, AM/FM		
3461	Clock Radio	Flip numbers, AM/FM		
3464	Clock Radio	Flip numbers, AM/FM		
3472	Clock Radio	Flip numbers, AM/FM		
3480	Clock Radio			
3483	Clock Radio	Flip numbers, AM/FM		
3524	Clock Radio	Flip numbers, AM/FM		
3545 B	Clock Radio	Flip numbers, AM/FM		
3566C	Clock Radio	Flip numbers, AM/FM		
3571	Clock Radio	Flip numbers, AM/FM		
3608-(A)	Clock Radio	AM/FM		
3611	Clock Radio	AM/FM		
3619	Clock Radio	AM/FM, woodgrain	1986	
3620	Clock Radio	AM/FM, available in woodgrain, white, pink		
3622	Clock Radio	AM/FM, battery backup		
3629	Clock Radio	AM/FM		
3634	Clock Radio	Cube-style, AM/FM, "Morning Call", black or white		
3636	Clock Radio	AM/FM		
3638	Clock Radio	Cube-style, AM/FM		
3646	Clock Radio	AM/FM		
3654	Clock Radio	Cube style, AM/FM		
3657	Clock Radio	AM/FM, black, white or silver		
3658	Clock Radio	LED, AM/FM, twin alarm with weekday/weekend, various colours		
3659	Clock Radio	AM/FM		
3665	Clock Radio	AM/FM/Weather band		
3667	Clock Radio	AM/FM Stereo, "Morning Call"		
3676	Clock Radio	AM/FM		
3691-(C)	Clock Radio	AM/FM		
3700	Clock Radio	AM/FM/TV sound, battery backup		
3717-(A)	Clock Radio	AM/FM Weekly Calendar		
3728	Clock Radio	AM/FM, dual alarm		
3753	Clock Radio	AM/FM, dual alarm, night light		
3770	Clock Radio	AM/FM/TV sound		
3772-(A)	Clock Radio	AM/FM/TV sound/weather band		
3775-(A)	Clock Radio	AM/FM		
3789-(A)	Clock Radio	AM/FM, dual alarm		
3797	Clock Radio	AM/FM setero		
3826	Clock Radio	AM/FM, cassette player, "Morning Call"		
3827	Clock Radio	AM/FM, cassette player		
3831	Clock Radio	AM/FM, cassette player		
3832	Clock Radio	AM/FM, cassette player		
3834	Clock Radio	AM/FM, cassette recorder		
3838	Clock Radio	AM/FM, cassette player		
3842	Clock Radio	Euro-styled, AM/FM, cassette player, turquoise		
3844	Clock Radio	AM/FM, stereo, cassette player, "Morning Call"		
3846	Clock Radio	AM/FM, cassette player		
3850-(B)	Clock Radio	AM/FM, cassette player		
3852	Clock Radio	AM/FM, cassette recorder		
3654	Clock Radio	Eurostyle, LED, battery back-up, sleep timer, back-lit controls		
3856	Clock Radio	AM/FM, stereo, cassette recorder		
3867	Clock Radio	AM/FM, stereo, cassette recorder		
3917	Television	Portable, 12V, 16cm, B&W, VHF/UHF	1986	
3933	Clock Radio	Flip numbers, AM/FM, stereo		
3969	Clock Radio	AM/FM stereo		
4059	Portable Radio	AM/FM, 8-track player		
4323	Portable Radio	FM stereo, cassette player		
4366	Portable Radio	Cassette recorder		
4456	Stereo System	AM/FM, stereo, 8-track		
4493	Stereo System	AM/FM, stereo, 8-track player		
4520	Stereo System	Tuner, turntable	1977	
4610	Portable Radio	AM/FM, cassette player		
4615	Portable Radio	AM/FM, cassette player		
4626	Portable Radio	AM/FM, stereo, cassette		
4628	Portable Radio	AM/FM, stereo, cassette		
4635	Portable Radio	AM/FM, stereo, cassette player		
4669	Stereo System	AM/FM, stereo, 8-track recorder		
4745	Portable Radio	AM/FM, stereo, cassette		
4774	Stereo System	AM/FM, stereo, 8-track, turntable		
4840	Stereo System	8-track player, stereo		
4843	Stereo System	8-track, stereo		
4873	Portable Audio	Portable TV, AM/FM, dual cassette		
5018	Stereo System	8-track player, stereo		
5163	Walkie-Talkie	CB walkie-talkie, pair, morse code key		
5196	Stereo System			
5642	Stereo System	AM/FM, cassette recorder		
5844	Stereo System	AM/FM, cassette, 8-track player		
5937	Stereo System	Tuner, cassette, 8-track player		
5943	Stereo System	Tuner, clock, cassette, 8-track player		
5958	Stereo System	AM/FM tuner, cassette record, 8-track player		
5988	Stereo System	AM/FM, cassette, 8-track, VFD clock		
6621-48	Stereo System	AM/FM/FM stereo, cassette recorder, turntable		
7035	Clock Radio	AM/FM, cassette player, telephone		
7144	Walkie-Talkie	CB walkie-talkie, pair		
7525	Clock Radio			
7535	Clock Radio	AM/FM, telephone, "Morning Call"		
7539	Clock Radio	AM/FM, telephone, "Morning Call"		
7540-(A)	Clock Radio	AM/FM, telephone		
7541	Clock Radio	Black or white		
7547	Clock Radio			
7553	Clock Radio	LED, AM/FM, cassette player, telephone		
7554-(A)	Clock Radio	AM/FM, telephone		
7560-A	Clock Radio	AM/FM, telephone		
7561-(D)	Clock Radio	AM/FM, telephone		
7580	Clock Radio	AM/FM, cassette player, telephone, black or white		
7612	Portable Radio	Cassette recorder		
7620	Portable Radio	Cassette recorder		
7928	Telephone	"Twin Phone" (corded and cordless phones, intercom)		
8191	Television	19" CRT	1987	
8192	Television	19" CRT	1985	
8300	Calculator			
8301	Calculator			
8309-232	Calculator			
8400	Calculator	VFD		
AC-80	Home Care	Air purifier/ionizer		
S328B	Clock Radio	CD, AM/FM, stereo, dual alarm, sleep timer, battery backup		
