= Android One: The Reactor Run =

1983 video game

- Developer: Mark Haigh-Hutchinson
- Publisher: Vortex Software
- Platforms: ZX Spectrum; Amstrad CPC
- Release: 1983: Spectrum; 1985: Amstrad
- Genre: Shoot 'em up
- Mode: Single-player

Android One: The Reactor Run is a shoot 'em up maze video game written by Mark Haigh-Hutchinson and published by Vortex Software in 1983 for the ZX Spectrum and in 1985 for the Amstrad CPC.

A sequel, Android Two, was released later in 1983.

== Gameplay ==
The aim of the game is to destroy the reactor before the reactor destroys everything. This is done via blasting through walls, avoiding debris, and fighting mutants with player's Android.

The maze is presented in a scrolling top-down view, using tile based graphics.
