= PackageForge =

ToolAware PackageForge
- Developer(s): ToolAware
- Stable release: 1.0.0 / June 7, 2010
- Written in: C++
- Operating system: Windows
- Type: Installation & Packaging
- License: Proprietary
- Website: http://www.toolaware.com/packageforge.html

PackageForge is a commercial graphical installation and packaging software tool for Symbian OS based smartphones. PackageForge allows developers to graphically create software installation packages that can be installed to a Symbian OS based phone. After installation a user can start using the installed software application.

PackageForge works by providing a graphical interface towards the Symbian package definition files (.pkg). The developer provides information about the package, like the vendor, package name, version and what application files to include. After the package has been defined, the package is compiled and built into a Symbian installation file (.sis) which is then ready to be uploaded to the Nokia OVI store or for direct installation on a phone.

The SIS installation files are used for installing Flash Lite, Python for S60, Symbian C/C++ or Qt for Symbian applications.

== Most Notable Features ==
- Wizards for creating different package types
- Compatibility with makesis/signsis and Carbide.c++ development environment
- Localization support for multilingual packages
- One-click build and sign of a package
- Graphical management of software and device dependencies
- User-friendly build log

== See also ==
- .sis
- Symbian OS
- List of installation software
