= NTT Docomo FOMA D905i =

2007 NTT Docomo mobile phone

FOMA D905i
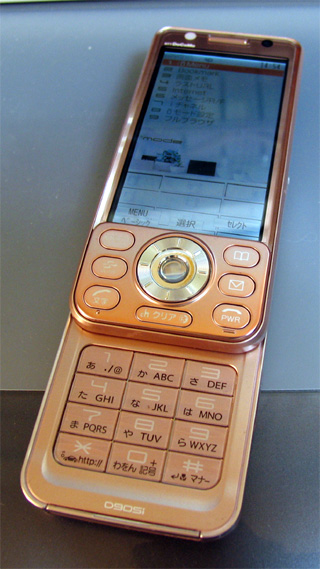
- Front view
- Brand: NTT Docomo
- Manufacturer: Mitsubishi Electric
- Type: Feature phone
- Series: 905i
- First released: November 26, 2007; 18 years ago
- Predecessor: D904i
- Compatible networks: 3G: FOMA (W-CDMA); 2G: GSM
- Form factor: Slider
- Colors: Pink Gold; Shine Black; Natural White; Orange Yellow
- Dimensions: 110 mm (4.3 in) H 49 mm (1.9 in) W 18.7 mm (0.74 in) D
- Weight: 132 g (4.7 oz)
- Operating system: Symbian OS v9.3 + MOAP(S)
- CPU: SH-Mobile G2
- Removable storage: microSD (up to 2 GB)
- Rear camera: 3.2 MP CMOS
- Front camera: 0.1 MP CMOS
- Display: 3.1 in (79 mm) TFT LCD, Full Wide VGA (480×864 px), 260k colors

The FOMA D905i is a third-generation (3G) FOMA mobile phone terminal developed and manufactured by Mitsubishi Electric for NTT Docomo. It was part of the 905i series.

== History ==
- September 3, 2007: Passed Federal Communications Commission (FCC) certification.
- September 6, 2007: Passed Telecom Engineering Center (TELEC) certification.
- September 26, 2007: Passed Japan Approvals Institute for Telecommunications Equipment (JATE) certification.
- November 1, 2007: Formal development announcement by NTT Docomo alongside the 905i and 705i series lineups.
- November 26, 2007: Official commercial release.
- December 11, 2007: First software update distributed.
- March 11, 2008: Second software update distributed.

== Specifications ==
=== Hardware ===
The FOMA D905i features a slider form factor measuring 110 mm × 49 mm × 18.7 mm and weighing approximately 132 grams. It is powered by a SuperH SH-Mobile G2 processor. The main display is a 3.1-inch TFT LCD with a resolution of 480×864 pixels (Full Wide VGA) capable of displaying up to 260,000 colors.

The primary rear camera uses a 3.2-megapixel CMOS sensor supporting autofocus and image stabilization, while the front camera utilizes a 0.1-megapixel CMOS sensor. Connectivity features include 3G FOMA (W-CDMA) across 800 MHz, 1.7 GHz, and 2 GHz bands with HSDPA support, as well as 2G GSM support across 900 MHz, 1800 MHz, and 1900 MHz bands. Hardware facilities include an infrared port, an Osaifu-Keitai FeliCa chip, an FM radio receiver, an FM transmitter, a motion sensor, and a microSD expansion slot supporting cards up to 2 GB. The device delivers up to 200 minutes of continuous 3G voice call talk time and up to 530 hours of 3G static standby time. This mobile phone also support 1Seg recordings.

=== Software ===
The operating system running on the D905i is Symbian OS v9.3 using the MOAP(S) user interface. It includes support for i-mode services, full web browsing, i-appli (Java ME), i-channel, i-concier, and 2in1 dual-number management.

== Software updates regarding to known issues ==
The D905i has multiple flaws as the software updates were announced:

- On December 11, 2007, a software update was issued to resolve an issue where configuring card information or setting passwords within the iD mobile credit application resulted in an error stating "iD application not found".
- On March 11, 2008, a software update resolved issues including audio-video desynchronization during playback of downloaded Music&Video Channel clips, GPS positioning failures under specific conditions, wallpaper battery icon display bugs associated with customized themes, and updated explanatory text in the Area Mail reception setup menu.
- On November 5, 2008, a software update fixed an issue where downloading or updating i-appli or IC applications in poor signal environments caused an "Alpha Error" prompt, preventing application startup.

== See also ==
- D705i
- D904i
- SH905i
- P-02A
- F-03A
