= FM transmitter =

FM transmitter may refer to:

- A transmitter sending out a frequency modulated signal
- A personal FM transmitter, a very short range device to enable the listening of music from a music device through the speakers of a regular FM radio.
