= Nokia N8 =

2010 smartphone model manufactured by Nokia

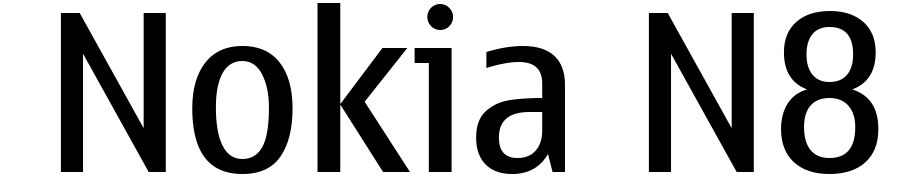

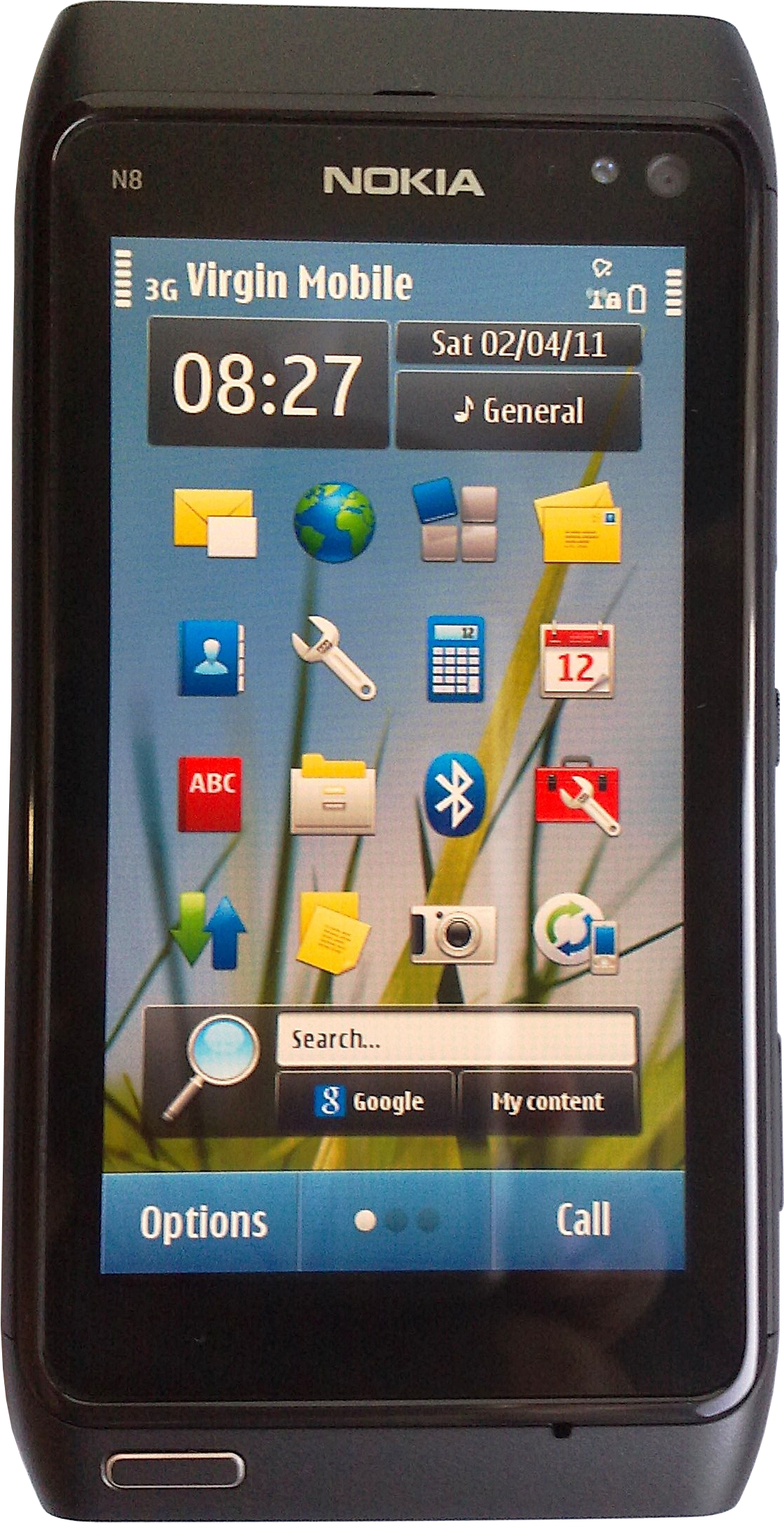
- The Nokia N8 is the first device to run on the Symbian^3 mobile operating system.
- Manufacturer: Nokia
- Series: Nseries
- Availability by region: 30 September 2010 (Finland); 1 October 2010 (United Kingdom)
- Predecessor: Nokia N97; Nokia N86 8MP
- Successor: Nokia 808 PureView; Nokia N9; Nokia Lumia 800; Nokia 8
- Related: Nokia E7-00
- Compatible networks: HSDPA (Pentaband) HSUPA 850 / 900 / 1700 / 1900 / 2100; Quad band GSM / GPRS / EDGE GSM 850, GSM 900, GSM 1800, GSM 1900
- Form factor: Slate bar
- Dimensions: 113.5mm × 59 mm × 12.9 mm (4.47 in × 2.32 in × 0.51 in)
- Weight: 135 g (4.8 oz)
- Operating system: Symbian^3, upgradeable to Nokia Belle Refresh (111.040.1511)
- CPU: ARM11 680 MHz Samsung K5W4G2GACA – AL54 processor; 3D Graphics Broadcom BCM2727 GPU with HW Accelerator with OpenGL-ES 2.0 support
- Memory: 256 MB SDRAM
- Storage: 512 MB internal NAND memory; 135 MB available to user; 16 GB on-board memory
- Removable storage: Hot swap microSD; up to 32 GB supported w/ microSDHC support
- Battery: BL-4D 1200 mAh Li-Ion fixed battery
- Rear camera: 12.1 megapixels with Carl Zeiss optics and xenon flash, 16:9 720p video with continuous AutoFocus, 30 frame/s
- Front camera: VGA, for video calling
- Display: 210 ppi pixel density 640 × 360 px (nHD), 3.5" capacitive, multi-touch display with AMOLED technology
- Connectivity: USB 2.0 via MicroUSB; USB On-The-Go; Bluetooth 3.0; Wi-Fi 802.11b/g/n; FM transmitter; TV-out; HDMI out with Dolby Digital Plus Surround Sound; GPS with A-GPS; 3G
- Data inputs: Capacitive multi-touch display; External functional hardware keys; Virtual keyboard; multiple text-entry options
- Development status: Available 1 October 2010; Discontinued

The Nokia N8 is a touchscreen-based smartphone developed by Nokia. Announced on 27 April 2010, the Nokia N8 was the first device to run on the Symbian^3 mobile operating system and it was the company's flagship device for the year. It was released on 30 September 2010 at the Nokia Online Store before being released in markets around the world on 1 October 2010. There were two versions made, the N8 and the N8-00. The N8 was made for Vodafone and locked to its networks, and the N8-00 was an unlocked version.

The N8 has a 3.5-inch AMOLED display with 16 gigabytes of mass memory, and features a 12-megapixel camera, the second time a camera of such a megapixel count was used (the first one being the Sony Ericsson Satio in 2009) with a Xenon flash (like the Nokia N82 and 6220) and a 1/1.83" sensor size (which was larger than most point-and-shoot cameras of the time). It also has 720p HD video recording, a pentaband 3.5G radio, and an FM transmitter. Among the connectivity features are an HDMI output, USB On-The-Go, and Wi-Fi 802.11 b/g/n.

The N8 was an important device for Nokia in its bid against increasing competition in the smartphone industry, and its revamped Symbian^3 software was also important. The device was delayed several times pushing its release date by several months, which harmed the company. Despite mixed views on the Symbian software, the N8's hardware build and camera quality were very well received, with many calling it the "best camera phone". The N8 would also become Nokia's last flagship device running Symbian, due to the Nokia Lumia 800 in 2011 which ran on Windows Phone software. The N8's Symbian successor, the Nokia 808 PureView, appeared in 2012.

== History ==
The previous flagship phone in the Nseries was the N97, which was criticised for its initial firmware issues. Anssi Vanjoki, Nokia's Executive Vice President for Markets, said in an interview that software quality control would be better than for the N97. The N97's reception was highly negative and tarnished the company's image in the market. The N8 was the first device to feature the Symbian^3 operating system. Initially scheduled for the second quarter of 2010, the N8 was pushed back to the third quarter, being finally released on 30 September 2010 due to 'final amendments'. The N8 became the product with the most customer pre-orders in Nokia's history up to the point of its release and sales in Q4 2010 were estimated to be almost 4 million.

The previous Nokia phone with a focus on photography had been the N86 8MP, which has an 8-megapixel sensor and had become available in June 2009.

The N8 was the second Nokia to have a capacitive touchscreen, following the X6, and the first with multi-touch.

== Design ==
=== Body ===
- Anodised aluminium monocoque case
- Available in silver white, dark grey, orange, blue, green, pink and brown
- Size: 113.5 mm × 59 mm × 12.9 mm
- Weight (including battery): 135 g (4.8 oz)
- Camera with Carl Zeiss optics and 12.1-megapixel resolution

=== Display ===
- 3.5" AMOLED screen with capacitive touch
- 640 × 360 pixels nHD (16:9 aspect ratio)
- Gorilla glass protective layer
- 16M Colors

== Hardware ==
- 680 MHz ARM11 processor (ARM v6 architecture)
- 256 MB RAM
- Broadcom BCM2727 GPU VideoCore III Multimedia Engine with dedicated 3D Graphics HW Accelerator with OpenGL-ES 1.1/2.0 support. 32 Mtriangles/sec
- 16 GB internal memory
- MicroSD memory card slot, hot swappable, up to 32 GB

=== Power and related information ===
The Nokia N8 has dual charging options, allowing it to be charged both from a standard-pin Nokia charger, and through the micro-USB port.

The Nokia N8's battery compartment is internally contained and thus the battery is not entirely straightforwardly removable or replaceable by users. Nonetheless, although the procedure is not endorsed by Nokia, it is possible with the correct tool and careful handling to change the battery.

BL-4D 1200 mAh Lithium-ion battery.

- Standard Nokia 2 mm charger connector
- Talk-time (maximum):
  - GSM 720 min.
  - WCDMA 350 min.
- Standby time (maximum):
  - GSM 390 h
  - WCDMA 400 h
- Video playback time (H.264 720p, 30 fps, maximum): 6.5 h
- Video recording time (H.264 720p, 30 fps, maximum): 3.5 h
- Music playback time (maximum): 54 h

=== Data and connectivity ===
- GPRS/EDGE class B, multislot class 33
- HSDPA Cat9, maximum speed up to 10.2 Mbit/s, HSUPA Cat5 2.0 Mbit/s
- WLAN IEEE 802.11 b/g/n
- TCP/IP support
- Capability to serve as data modem
- Support for MS Outlook synchronization of contacts, calendar and notes
- Bluetooth 3.0
- HDMI mini C connector
- High-Speed USB 2.0 Micro USB connector with USB charging
  - USB On-The-Go with built-in support for mass storage devices, HID keyboard, mice, and USB headphones
- 3.5 mm Nokia AV connector supporting the connection of hands-free headsets, regular headphones, or a Nokia TV-out cable
- FM radio
- Short-range FM transmitter

=== Operating frequency ===
- Quadband GSM/EDGE 850/900/1800/1900
- Pentaband WCDMA 850/900/1700/1900/2100
- Automatic switching between WCDMA & GSM bands
- Flight mode

=== Sensors ===
- Orientation sensor
- Digital compass (Magnetometer)
- Proximity sensor
- Ambient light detector

== Software ==
=== Software platform and user interface ===
The N8 was the first Nokia smartphone device to run on the Symbian^3 operating system.

From 7 February 2012, Nokia Belle update was available for N8 through Nokia Suite. In August of that year, Nokia also started to roll out the Nokia Belle Refresh update. This update brought new features to the Symbian Smartphone like HTML 5 web apps support and a new set of home screen widgets.

Other software which will function on the N8 smartphone:

- HTML 5
- Java MIDP 2.3
- OMA DM 1.2, OMA
- Qt (framework) 4.7.3, Web Runtime 7.3
- Software updates Over the Air (FOTA) and over the internet
- Flash Lite 4.0 (Note: Flash Lite 4 has been made available via partner Calsoft)

=== Applications ===
- Key built in applications include: calendar, contacts, music player, photos, videos, video and photo editors, office document viewers and editors (with new firmware), radio with Radio Data System (RDS) support
- PC applications: Nokia Ovi Suite, Nokia Ovi Player
- Online applications: Nokia Ovi Store, internet, messaging, Ovi Maps, Web TV, Mail
- Extra applications: Shazam Music Recognition Service, Joikuspot Free Version (extra applications may be changed/removed in certain regional firmware)

== Communications ==
=== Email and messaging ===
- Email client with HTML and attachment support for images, videos, music, and documents.
- Unified mail client for multiple providers: Yahoo! mail, Gmail, Windows Live, Hotmail and other popular POP3/IMAP services, Mail For Exchange, IBM Lotus traveler
- Support for editing office documents
- Support for PDF files.
- MMS support has Facebook application, Twitter, etc.

The Anna operating system update gave Communicator support (which is usually reserved for E-Series devices). There was also a new push notification API and a corresponding app.

== Sharing and Internet ==
=== Browsing and Internet ===
Proprietary web browser, including:

- Supported protocols: HTTP v1.1, WAP
- JavaScript, Flash Lite 4.0, HTML5 and Flash video support (up to 480p)
- RSS reader
- Social networking profiles (e.g. Facebook, Twitter) automatically sync with contacts app and updates are visible in phone contacts.

== Navigation ==
- Integrated GPS, with A-GPS functionality
- Free voice-guided navigation via OVI Maps Free Lifetime Navigation (not all Navteq maps are available in and/or from all countries; e.g. Japan)
- Wi-Fi Positioning
- Electronic compass

== Photography ==
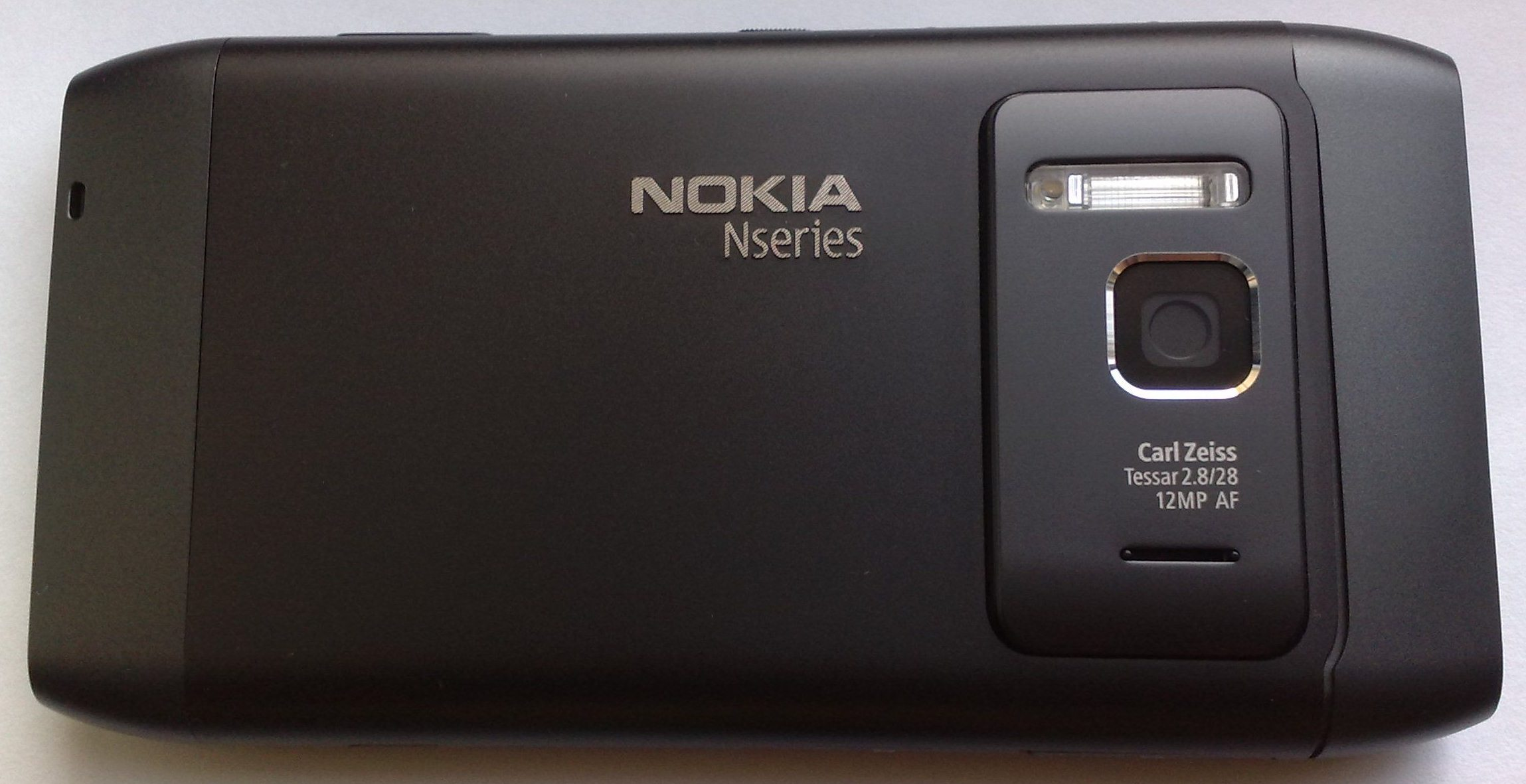
Rear view of the Nokia N8 illustrating the 12-megapixel autofocus lens with Carl Zeiss optics and xenon flash

=== Camera ===
- 12-megapixel camera with 4 elements Carl Zeiss tessar optics and mechanical protection shutter
- Shutter: rolling shutter
- Xenon flash
- Focal length: 5.9 mm
- Aperture: f/2.8
- Fullscreen 16:9 viewfinder with touchscreen parameters
- Pixel size: 1.75 μm
- Camera sensor size: 1/1.83", the largest in a mobile device at the time of launch
- Autofocus
- Neutral density filter, activates automatically in very bright scenes
- Secondary VGA camera for video calls, also usable for self-portraits

=== Image capture ===
- Geotagging of images and video
- Face detection software
- Photo editor

== Video ==
=== Video cameras ===
- Main camera
  - Video capture in 720p 30 frame/s (after Belle update) with codecs H.264, MPEG-4. Bitrate hovers around ~13 Mbit/s
  - 3x lossless digital zoom (it retains the HD quality of video by using its full 12 Mpx sensor)
  - Stereo MEMS microphones, records @129 kbit/s, 48 kHz sampling rate
- Secondary 0.3 Mpx(VGA) camera for video calls

The video-capturing feature is complemented by the mini HDMI port located on the top side of the phone, which normally mirrors the phone's screen, but allows for applications (such as the built-in video player, the Nokia Big Screen app and selected games) to output content in resolutions up to 720p. The corresponding cable is provided in the retail box in most regions.

=== Video sharing and playback ===
- 720p video playback through HDMI with Dolby Digital Plus Surround Sound
- Support for subtitle in .srt and .sub format with UTF-8 encoding
- Video editing software

== Music ==
- At the time of its launch in November 2010 the Nokia N8 came with the "Comes With Music" service (also branded "Ovi Music Unlimited") in selected markets. In January 2011, Nokia stopped offering the Ovi Music Unlimited service in 27 of the 33 countries where it was offered. The service is still offered in China, India and Indonesia with a 12-month subscription and in Brazil, Turkey and South Africa with a 6-month subscription. The reason for the closure in a majority of the markets where Ovi Music Unlimited was offered was due to a lack of popularity.
- Ovi Music store
- Digital rights management support: Windows Media DRM and OMA DRM 2.0
- Short-range FM transmitter
- Stereo FM radio (87.5–108 MHz/76–90 MHz) with RDS

== Accessories ==
The Nokia Mobile TV Headset provides DVB-H TV.

The Nokia Digital Radio Headset (CU-17a) allows the device to receive DAB and DAB+ transmissions.

== Development support ==
Applications can be developed using the Nokia Qt framework.

== Promotion ==
To highlight the capabilities of the Nokia N8 camera, Nokia created a short film, The Commuter, in October 2010. Directed by the McHenry Brothers and starring Dev Patel, Ed Westwick, Charles Dance and Pamela Anderson, the seven-minute film was shot entirely on the phone's 720p camera. For the Spanish promotion of the phone they also created a short video featuring luminescent puppets, called "Love Knot ".

The phone was also used to film Drums of Death's "Won't Be Long" music video.

Using CellScope technology, Nokia also released another film called "Dot" which they marketed to as the world's smallest stop-motion animation character.

The device also appeared on the popular Showtime TV show Dexter, and the BBC TV series Hustle, as well as the film TRON: Legacy. It is also the phone Sarah Lund uses in the third series of The Killing.

In Asian countries, it was promoted differently through the fictional character Pier Roxas on Nokia's Project Gener8 by Young & Rubicam Philippines. He also appeared on the GMA talk show Startalk to promote the device.

The "Nokia Shorts 2011" competition involved 8 Short films shot on a Nokia N8. The winner was "Splitscreen: A Love Story".

The independent film Olive, which is the first feature-length film of about 90 minutes to be made entirely with a cell phone, uses the Nokia N8 along with an old-fashioned video camera attachment with a 35 mm lens made exclusively for the device and to trick the audience by not realizing it was made from the Nokia N8.

== See also ==
- List of Nokia products
