= Osaris =

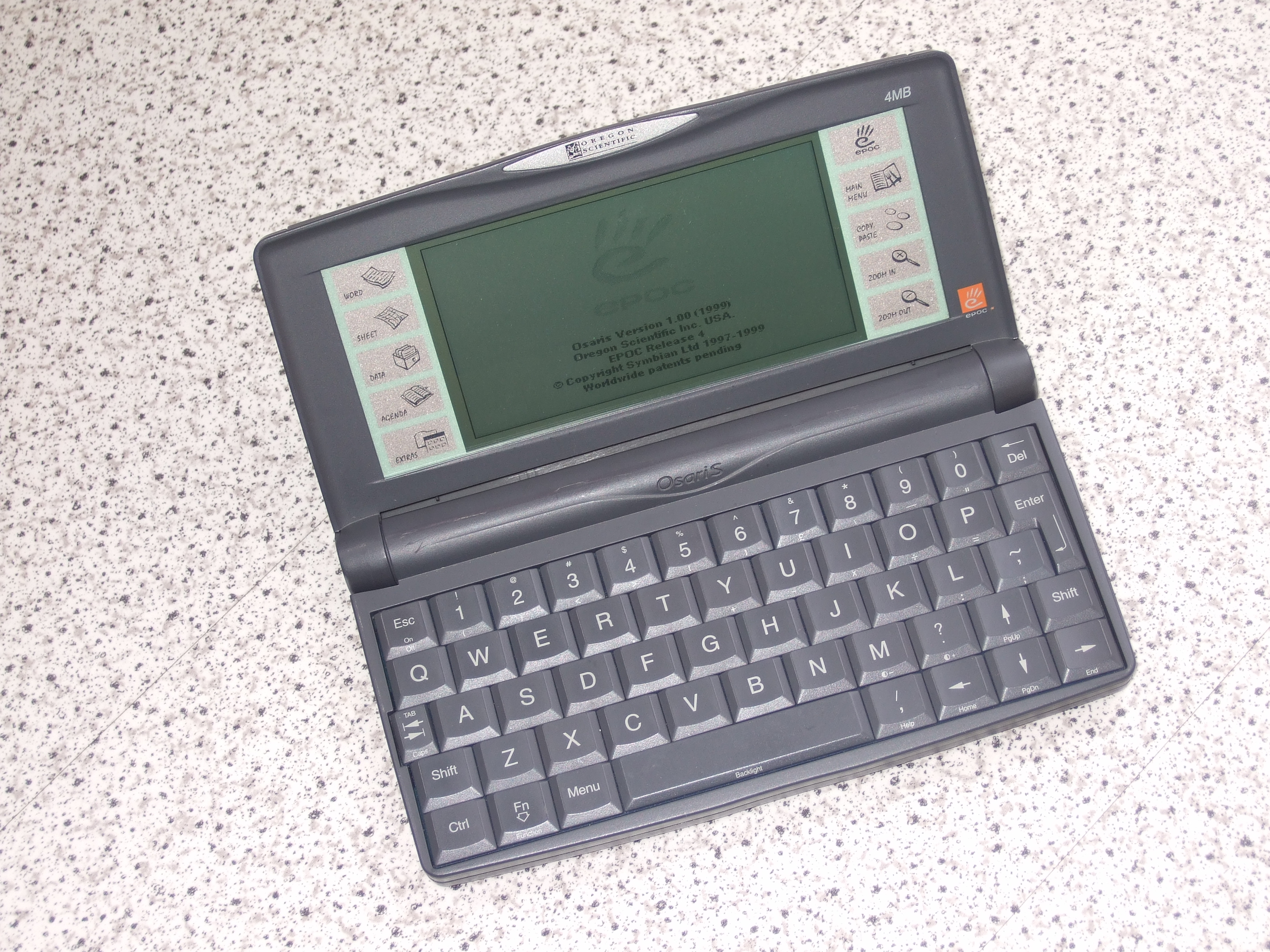
- Developer: Oregon Scientific
- Type: PDA
- Released: 1999; 27 years ago
- Lifespan: 1999–2000
- Introductory price: £219.99 (equivalent to £482 in 2023)
- Media: CompactFlash
- Operating system: EPOC32
- CPU: ARM 710 @ 18.432 MHz
- Display: 320 × 200 monochrome LCD
- Input: QWERTY keyboard
- Camera: N/A
- Touchpad: N/A
- Connectivity: Serial 115,200 bit/s RS-232; IrDA (infrared)
- Power: 2 × AA battery
- Dimensions: 170 mm × 90 mm × 20 mm (6.69 in × 3.54 in × 0.79 in)
- Weight: 250 g (8.8 oz)
- Related: Psion Series 5

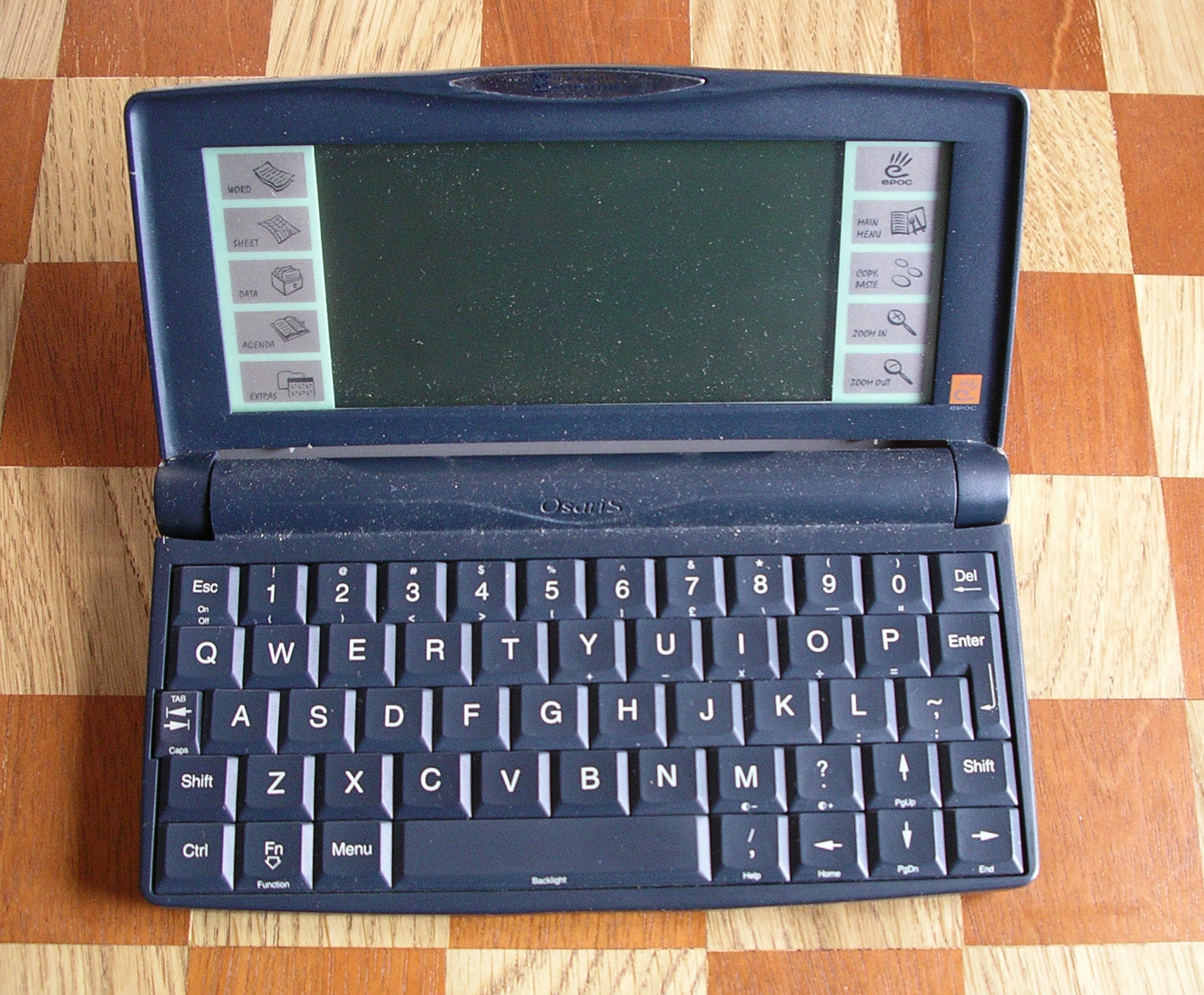
Osaris with lid open - (on 5cm squares)

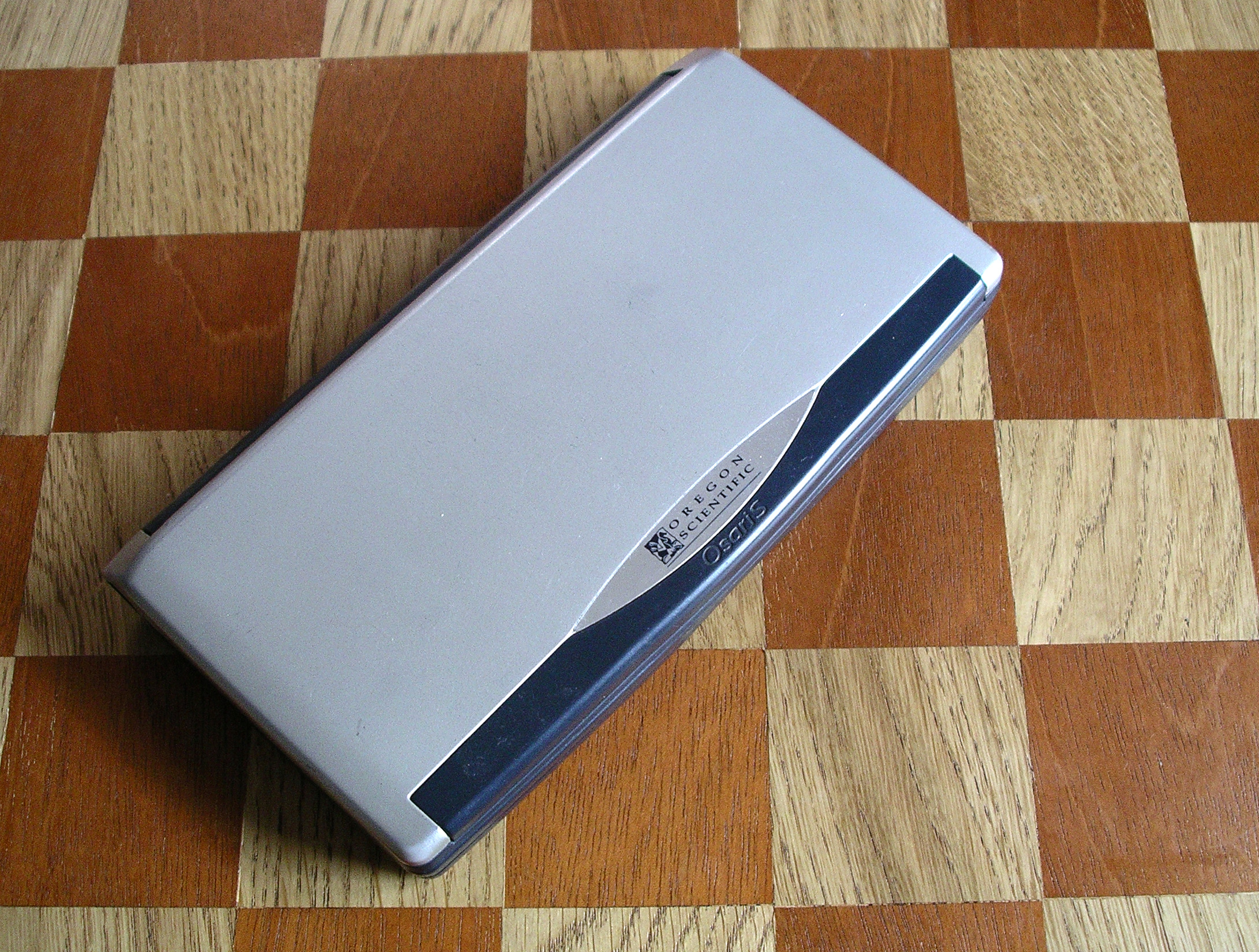
Osaris with lid closed - (on 5cm squares)

Osaris is a personal digital assistant (PDA) featuring the EPOC operating system (OS) distributed by Oregon Scientific.

The Osaris was released in 1999, and at the time priced at £219.99 (equivalent to £691 in 2023) to £279.99 (equivalent to £880 in 2023). The Osaris contains an 18.432 MHz CL-PS7111 (ARM 710) processor and is powered by two AA size batteries or an external power 6 volt AC adapter, with a 3 volt CR2032 cell providing backup power. The liquid-crystal display (LCD) is a touchscreen, backlit 320 × 200 pixels with 16 greyscale levels. There are also 10 membrane keys, 5 on each side of the LCD. The Osaris can be linked to a PC via an RS-232 link cable and IrDA (Infrared). The Osaris contains 8 MB of read-only memory (ROM), and, depending on the model, 4 MB, 8 MB or 16 MB random-access memory (RAM). The memory can also be expanded using CompactFlash.

- Dimensions: 170 × 90 × 20 mm
- Weight: c. 250 g

After the debut of EPOC Release 5, the Osaris was the only PDA to use the EPOC Release 4 operating system. It also has the distinction of being the first device to run EPOC (later renamed Symbian OS) that was not built by Psion. It is very similar in ability to the Psion Series 5. The Osaris comes with these programs preinstalled:

- Agenda: For appointments, things to do, birthdays, anniversaries
- Data: For names, addresses, or other database use
- Jotter: For making quick notes
- Time: For alarms
- Calc: For simple or scientific calculations
- World: Shows a map, world times, dialling codes
- Word: For writing documents, letters
- Sheet: For tables, spreadsheets, graphs
- Program: Editor for writing computer programs
