= Sharp SH-07F =

Flip phone

SH-07F
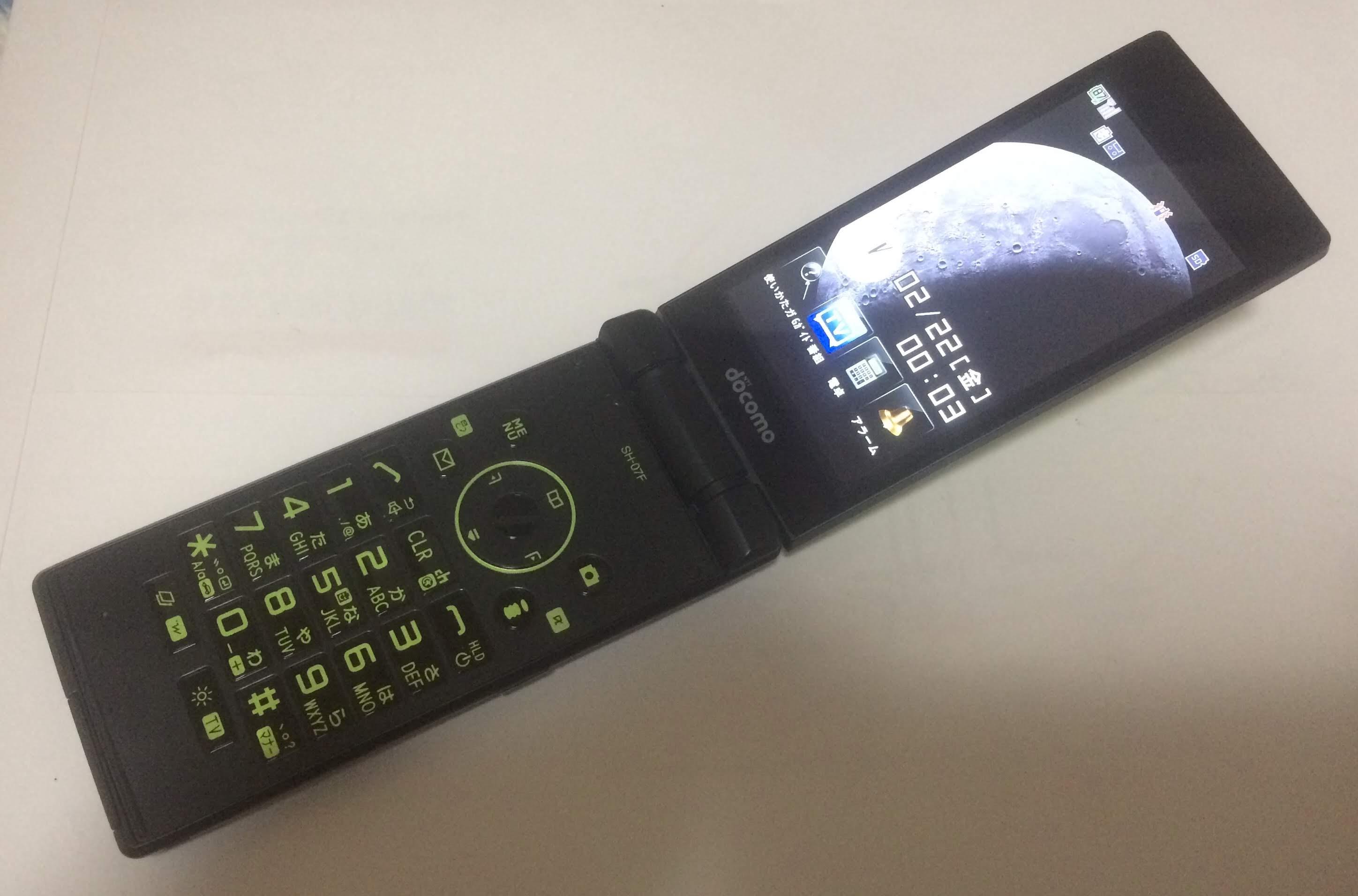
- Opened view (Green)
- Brand: NTT Docomo
- Manufacturer: Sharp
- First released: June 13, 2014
- Compatible networks: 3G: FOMA (W-CDMA) (800 MHz, 850 MHz, 2 GHz); 2G: GSM
- Form factor: Clamshell
- Colors: Green; Purple; Black; White
- Dimensions: 110 mm (4.3 in) H 49 mm (1.9 in) W 14.9 mm (0.59 in) D (Thickest part: 16 mm (0.63 in))
- Weight: 113 g (4.0 oz)
- Operating system: Symbian OS + Operator Pack Product (S)
- CPU: 1.2 GHz SH-Mobile AG5
- Removable storage: microSD (up to 2 GB), microSDHC (up to 32 GB)
- Rear camera: 5.0 megapixels CMOS image sensor, autofocus, image stabilization (stills & video), 720p HD video recording, face recognition
- Front camera: None
- Display: 3.3-inch, approx. 16.77 million colors New Mobile ASV LCD, Full Wide VGA (480 × 854 pixels)
- Water resistance: Waterproof and dustproof

The Docomo Keitai SH-07F is a 3G feature phone developed by Sharp for NTT Docomo's FOMA network. It is part of the "Docomo Keitai" lineup of feature phones.

Released on June 13, 2014, The handset serves as the successor to the SH-03E from NTT Docomo's 2012 winter lineup. It is marketed with the catchphrase "Waterproof Stylish Phone".

== Overview ==
=== Appearance ===
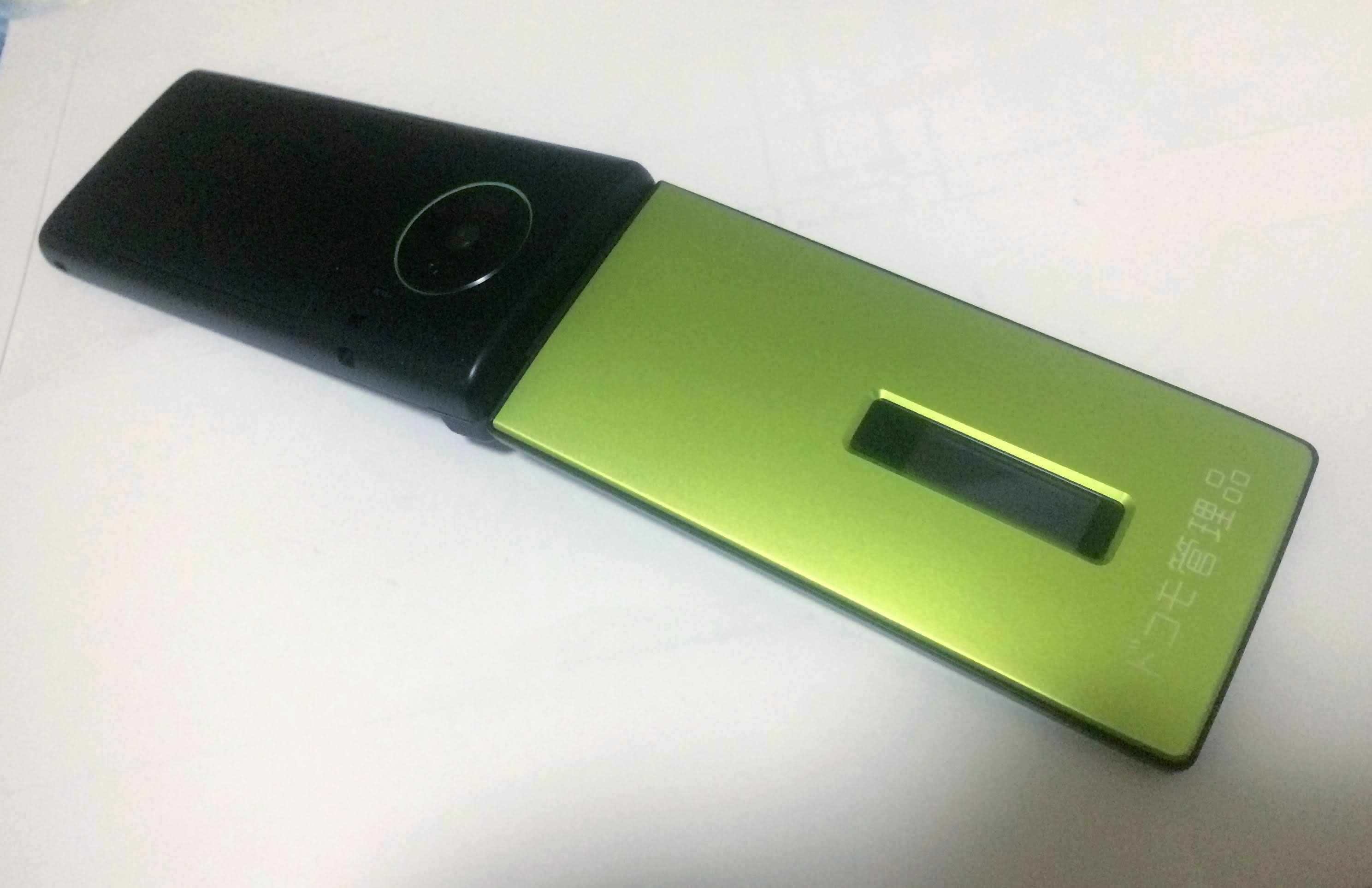
Exterior panel view (Green)

While maintaining the exact width of its predecessor, the SH-03E, the display size was expanded by approximately 20%, growing from 3.0 inches to 3.3 inches.

=== Design, hardware, software, and other features ===
The device features an aluminum front panel, and the outer border surrounding the secondary display sub-window uses a diamond-cut engraving style to establish a high-end feel. In tandem with the expanded screen real estate, UI visual elements—including home menu icons and text—were scaled up. The physical buttons were also optimized with bolder font weights to improve overall visibility.

The external sub-display is designed with increased clarity, using a highly legible bold font. The device is powered by a 1.2 GHz AG5 processor, a speed comparable to contemporary smartphones.

It also adopts the "docomo Palette UI" system used on Docomo smartphones, allowing users to categorize applications and functions into customized groups. The feature phone retains a suite of child safety options, such as a "Parental Control Mode" (Parent-Child Mode). This system allows parents to establish a separate security PIN code to restrict functions like phone calling, emailing, web browsing, the camera, and 1seg television playback.

Additionally, it features a dedicated security alarm function triggered by long-pressing the side key, which sets off a loud alert sound while automatically dialing pre-registered emergency contacts.
