= EKA1 =

Operating system kernel

- Developer: Psion; Symbian Ltd.
- Written in: Assembly language, C
- OS family: EPOC (Symbian)
- Working state: Discontinued
- Source model: Proprietary
- Initial release: 1989; 36 years ago
- Marketing target: PDAs, mobile phones
- Available in: English
- Supported platforms: x86, ARM
- Kernel type: Microkernel
- Succeeded by: EKA2
- Official website: developer.symbian.org/wiki/index.php/Category:Kernel_&_Hardware_Services

EKA1 (EPOC Kernel Architecture 1) is the first-generation kernel for the operating system Symbian OS. EKA1 originated in the earlier 32-bit operating system EPOC. It offers preemptive computer multitasking and memory protection, but no real-time computing guarantees, and a single-threaded device driver model. EKA1 was replaced by EKA2 as the default kernel starting with Symbian v9.

Much of EKA1 was developed by a single software engineer, Colly Myers, when he was working for Psion Software in the early 1990s. Myers went on to act as CEO for Symbian Ltd., when it was formed to license this kernel and associated operating system to mobile phone makers.

== See also ==
- Psion (company)
