= Adobe Flash Lite =

Lightweight version of Adobe Flash Player

- Original author(s): Macromedia
- Developer(s): Adobe Inc.
- Final release: 4.0 / 2010; 15 years ago
- Operating system: Symbian OS, Windows Mobile, BlackBerry OS, iOS, Bada, Android and Wii

Adobe Flash Lite (formerly Macromedia Flash Lite) is a discontinued lightweight version of Adobe Flash Player, a software application published by Adobe Systems for viewing Flash content. Flash Lite operates on devices that Flash Player cannot, such as mobile phones and other portable electronic devices like Wii, Chumby and Iriver.

Flash Lite allows users of these devices to view multimedia content and applications developed using Adobe's Flash tools, which had previously been available only on personal computers. As of 2014, Flash Lite has been superseded by Adobe AIR as the primary development platform for mobile Flash content.

== Technical overview ==
Flash Lite is a development technology implemented at the client-side, or user interface layer. Recent changes to ActionScript allow Flash Lite to better integrate with and even compete with device-layer technologies like Java ME and BREW. Flash Lite should not be considered a mobile operating system like Symbian OS, Windows Mobile, BlackBerry OS, iOS (iPhone OS), Bada (Samsung) or Android: it is a technology for developing applications that run on a mobile operating system.

Some features available in Flash are not available in Flash Lite, and Flash Lite has some features specifically for mobile devices.

In addition to Flash Lite, which is typically incorporated into a mobile device operating system as provided by the manufacturer, the full Adobe Flash Player may also be available for installation from the mobile device's application store (and currently only if the device has an ARM Cortex-A8 processor).

=== Version history ===
Flash Lite 1.1 supports Flash 4 ActionScript.

Flash Lite 2.0, based on Flash Player 7, supports Flash 7's newer ActionScript 2.0. Both Flash Lite 1.1 and 2.0 also support the World Wide Web Consortium's Standard SVG Tiny, a mobile profile of the consortium's Scalable Vector Graphics (SVG) recommendation. Unlike SVG, Flash Lite can add audio and interactive elements without the use of other technologies such as JavaScript. As with Flash, Flash Lite is able to read and redraw external XML content.

Flash Lite 3 is based on Flash 8, which lessens the gap between mobile and desktop content by supporting H.264 video standard, as well as On2 VP6 and Sorenson video codecs. Flash Lite 3 also introduces support for FLV video content (as used by YouTube and Google Video).

Flash Lite 4.0 supports ActionScript 3 and is a browser plugin, rather than a standalone player. It further extends the Flash Lite's features with multi-touch support, an advanced text rendering engine and a geolocation interface.

== History ==
In 2005, Adobe Systems completed its acquisition of Macromedia, the original developers of Flash. At that time, Flash Lite had been available to mobile users in Japan and Europe for some time prior to its availability in the United States. NTT DoCoMo was the first carrier to adopt Flash Lite in May 2003.

As a promotion for Flash Lite in February 2005, Macromedia conducted its first Mobile Flash Content Contest. From the over 150 applications submitted, nine winners were selected in areas of Best Business and Productivity Application, Most Innovative use of Flash Lite, Best Animation, Best Business Application, Best Educational Content, Best Game, Best Interactive Content, Best Productivity Application, and Best Overall Use of Flash Lite.

In May 2006, the iriver U10 (later re-branded as the iriver clix) was released, which supported Flash Lite content in a landscape page orientation. The U10 was the first digital audio player to support Flash Lite.

In 2005, almost 100% of Flash Lite enabled devices were found in Japan. In February 2007, Adobe claimed that over 70% of Flash Lite devices were shipped outside Japan.

In October 2006, Verizon Wireless announced support for Flash Lite, making it the first operator in the US to adopt the technology. Flash Lite was initially available on four handset models (Motorola RAZR V3c and V3m, Samsung SCH-a950 and LG The V (VX9800)) as a BREW extension. This allows users to download Flash Lite applications from Verizon's "Get It Now" service, but it does not allow users to view Flash objects from their web browser.

In February 2007, Adobe announced at the 3GSM World Congress in Barcelona that the next release of Flash Lite (version 3) would support video, including streaming video. In October 2007, Adobe announced the release of Flash Lite 3.

At Adobe's 2007 Financial Analyst Meeting, Al Ramadan, then senior vice-president of Adobe's Mobile and Voice Solutions Business Unit, announced that by December 2006, 220 million Flash Lite devices had been shipped. He also noted Adobe's acquisition of certain vector rendering technology by Actimagine, intended to reduce the Flash Lite player's memory footprint in future versions.

As of March 2008, neither Adobe nor Verizon Wireless have announced the availability of Adobe Flash Cast, per the February 2007 press release for availability by the end of calendar year 2007. In the same month, Steve Jobs described Flash Lite as "not capable of being used with the Web."

In September 2009, Opera Software integrated Flash Lite 3.1 in the Internet Channel application for the Wii gaming console.

=== Versions ===
- Macromedia Flash Lite 1.0
  - Based on Flash Player 4
- Macromedia Flash Lite 1.1
- Macromedia Flash Lite 2.0 (December 2005)
  - Released in 2005, which brought its capabilities in line with Flash Player 7
- Adobe Flash Lite 2.1 (December 2006)
  - Running on the BREW platform
- Adobe Flash Lite 3 (Announced in February 2007)
  - Support for FLV transcoding
  - Equivalent to desktop Flash Player 8
- Adobe Flash Lite 3.1 (February 2009)
- Adobe Flash Lite 4 has been released (2010) and integrated in Symbian^3 (Nokia N8, Nokia E7, Nokia 600, Nokia 700, Nokia 701)
  - Has ActionScript 3.0 support

The following table documents historical support for Flash Lite on mobile operating systems:

== Project Capuchin ==
On April 30, 2008, Sony Ericsson announced Project Capuchin, a bridge that allows Flash Lite to run as a front-end to Java ME and in this way, combine Java's APIs and direct communication with the mobile phone's hardware (Bluetooth, Wi-Fi and others) with Flash's graphical interface.

== See also ==
- SWF file format, the files generated by the Flash application
