= Nokia 600 =

Unreleased smartphone model

- Manufacturer: Nokia
- Type: Smartphone
- Series: Nokia 3-digit series
- First released: Unreleased
- Compatible networks: GSM (850/900/1800/1900 MHz); HSDPA (850/900/1700/1900/2100 MHz)
- Form factor: Bar
- Colors: Black, White, Pink, Lime
- Dimensions: H: 111 mm (4.4 in); W: 53 mm (2.1 in); D: 13 mm (0.51 in)
- Weight: 100 g (3.5 oz)
- Operating system: Symbian Belle
- CPU: 1.0 GHz processor
- Storage: 2 GB
- Removable storage: microSD, up to 32 GB
- Battery: 1200 mAh Li-ion, removable (Nokia BL-4J); Standby: up to 540 h (2G) up to 600 h (3G); Talktime: up to 15 h (2G) up to 6 h 30 min (3G)
- Rear camera: 5 MP VGA with LED flash Video: 720p@30fps
- Display: 3.2'' 360x640 px, TFT, 16M color
- Connectivity: Sensors: Accelerometer; Electronic compass; Proximity sensor; Other: 3.5 mm headphone jack; Bluetooth 3.0; Wi-Fi 802.11 b/g; GPS with A-GPS; FM radio, Stereo, RDS, FM transmitter, built-in Antenna; USB 2.0 via MicroUSB port; NFC
- Data inputs: Capacitive multi-touch display; External functional hardware keys; Virtual keyboard; multiple text-entry options

The Nokia 600 was an announced but unreleased touchscreen-based smartphone developed by Nokia. It was announced in August 2011 as one of three launch devices for the Symbian Belle operating system. The Nokia 600 was designed as a music-centric phone and would have been equipped with a 106-phon loudspeaker, which Nokia claimed was the loudest it had ever installed in a product.

It would have been available in Black, White, Pink and Lime. However, the phone was cancelled by Nokia in November 2011.

== Features ==
The device would have featured a 3.2" nHD (640x360 px) display and 5 megapixel camera with flash, 720p video recording and 2x digital zoom. It would have offered 2 GB of memory, expandable to 32 GB via microSD card, and a 1GHz processor.

It would also have featured HSPA (3.5G) network connectivity alongside Bluetooth 3.0, GPS, and NFC.

== Music and radio ==
The device was designed primarily for music. The included loudspeaker, according to Nokia, would have made the Nokia 600, as the 'loudest' phone, it had ever produced. The phone was also to have included FM radio functionality with a built-in antenna, meaning that a set of wired headphones would not have been required for the FM radio to function.

== Software ==
The Nokia 600 would have been one of three launch devices for the 'Belle' update of Nokia's Symbian operating system, which would prove to be the final update for the platform before Nokia switched to Microsoft's Windows Phone software.
