= MOAP =

MOAP (Mobile Oriented Applications Platform) is the software platform for NTT DoCoMo's Freedom of Mobile Multimedia Access (FOMA) service for mobile phones.

It has a closed user interface, so third parties cannot develop software for native application software, or install third party applications, unlike S60 and UIQ.

== Versions ==
Two MOAP versions exist:

- MOAP(S) – supported by Symbian OS based phones from several manufacturers such as Fujitsu, Sony Ericsson Japan, Mitsubishi, Sharp and others. Unlike other platforms based on Symbian, S60 and UIQ, MOAP(S) was not an open development platform, originally, but was then released as open-source software from Symbian Foundation under the Eclipse Public License (EPL).
- MOAP(L) – supported by Linux based phones from Panasonic and NEC. It is not an open development platform.
