= Nokia 500 =

2011 smartphone model

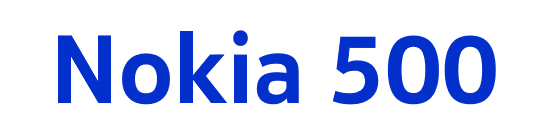

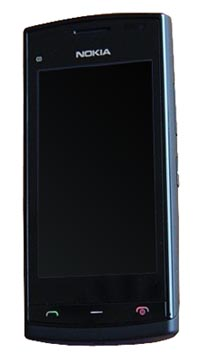
- Manufacturer: Nokia
- Type: Smartphone
- Series: Nokia 3-digit series
- First released: 1 August 2011; 14 years ago
- Predecessor: Nokia C5-03
- Successor: Nokia Lumia 510
- Related: Nokia X6-00
- Compatible networks: GSM (850/900/1800/1900 MHz); HSDPA (850/900/1700/1900/2100 MHz)
- Form factor: Monoblock
- Colors: Black, White (with exchangeable back covers in different colors)
- Dimensions: H: 111.3 mm (4.38 in); W: 53.8 mm (2.12 in); D: 14.1 mm (0.56 in)
- Weight: 93 g (3.3 oz)
- Operating system: Symbian Anna, upgradeable to Nokia Belle Refresh
- CPU: ARM11 1 GHz Samsung K5W2G1GACT – AP50 processor
- Memory: 256 MB RAM
- Storage: 2 GB
- Removable storage: microSD, up to 32 GB
- Battery: 1110 mAh Li-ion, removable (Nokia BL-4U)
- Rear camera: 5 MP; Video: 480p@15fps
- Display: 640 × 360 px (nHD), 3.2" capacitive, multi-touch TFT LCD
- Connectivity: Sensors: Accelerometer; Electronic compass; Proximity sensor; Other: 3.5 mm headphone jack; Bluetooth 2.1; Wi-Fi 802.11 b/g; GPS with A-GPS; FM radio, Stereo; USB 2.0 via MicroUSB port
- Data inputs: Capacitive multi-touch display; External functional hardware keys; Virtual keyboard; multiple text-entry options
- Model: RM-750

The Nokia 500 is a Symbian-powered smartphone by Nokia. It was first announced on 1 August 2011, with all models available by the end of the year. Instead of an OpenGL ES GPU, the 500 features a simpler OpenVG GPU, so, even though 3D apps work without hardware acceleration, some 2D and vector apps, like Angry Birds, work correctly.
