= Python for S60 =

Programming language for smartphones

- Paradigm: Multi-paradigm: Object-oriented, Imperative, Functional
- Designed by: Guido van Rossum
- Developer: Python Software Foundation
- First appeared: 2006; 19 years ago
- Stable release: 2.0.0 / 11 February 2010; 15 years ago
- Implementation language: C++, Python
- OS: Symbian OS, S60 platform
- License: Apache license, Python Software Foundation License
- Website: garage.maemo.org/projects/pys60/

Python for S60, also called PyS60 is a port of the Python programming language for the S60 software platform, originally based on Python 2.2.2 from 2002. The port was developed by Nokia. The final version, PyS60-2.0.0, was released on 11 February 2010. It came with multiple improvements, the most notable of which was an update to a new core based on Python 2.5.4.

== Release history ==
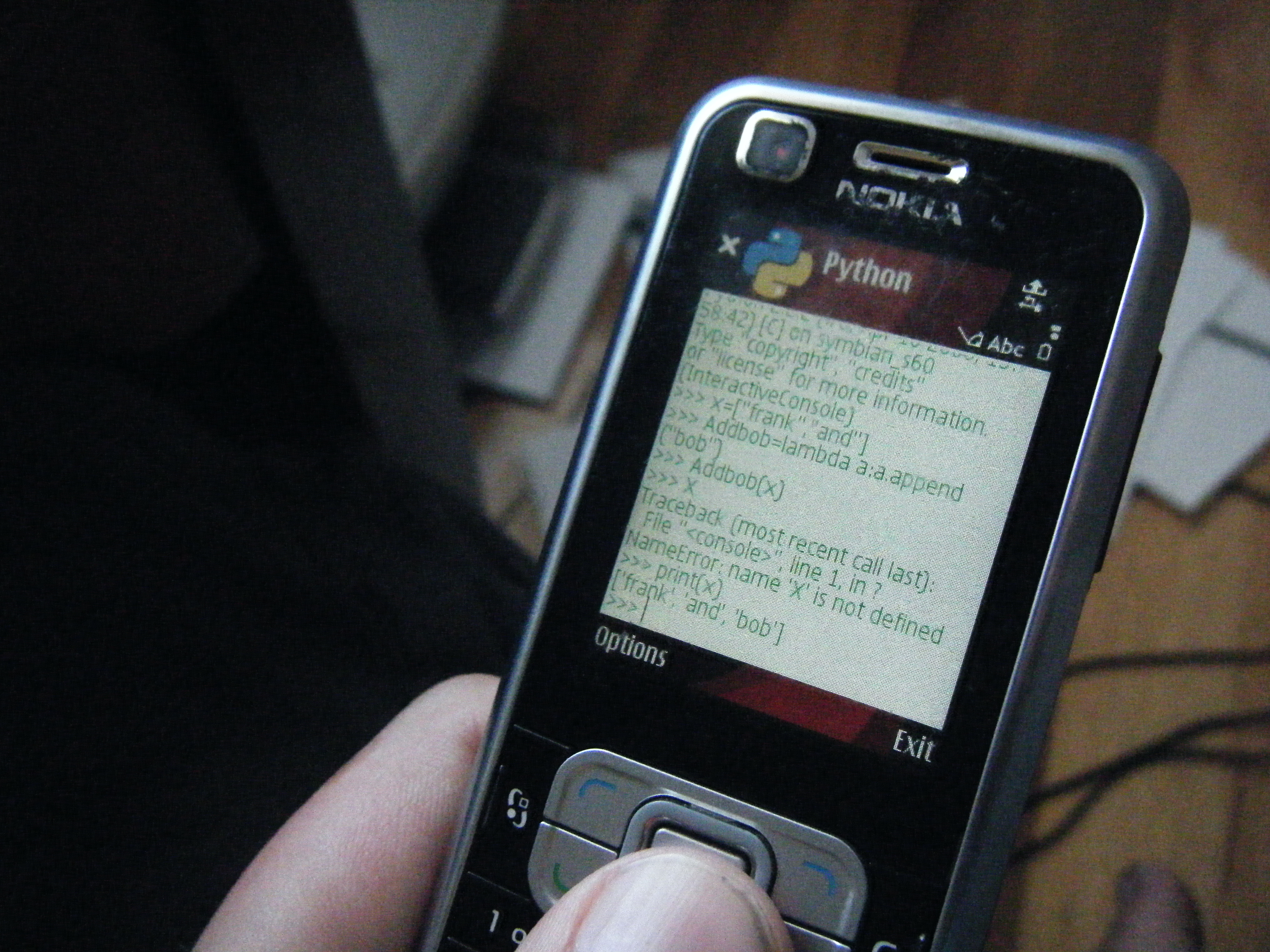
Python Shell on Nokia 6120 Classic

First released in 2005, PyS60 featured a relatively small set of modules and functions. Version 1.2, the last closed-source release and the second version of PyS60, brought many improvements and was made available on 21 October 2005 on the Nokia Forums.

After becoming open-source, PyS60 had the advantage of a strong and dedicated community that actively contributed to improving it. The milestone release was version 1.3.11.

The final version that supported the S60 2nd Edition platform, 1.4.5, was released on 3 December 2008. On 24 December 2008, a developer version, 1.9.0, was released. It featured several improvements, the most notable of which was a new core based on Python 2.5.1.

The final version, 2.0.0, was released on 11 February 2010. Which core is based on Python 2.5.4.

== See also ==
- List of Python software
- List of integrated development environments for Python
- Open Programming Language for older Symbian devices
