= Symbian Foundation =

Non-profit organisation

Symbian Foundation Ltd.
- Type: non-profit organisation
- Industry: Open mobile software platform
- Predecessor: Symbian Ltd
- Founded: 24 June 2008
- Founder: Nokia; Sony Ericsson; NTT DoCoMo; Motorola; Texas Instruments; Vodafone; LG Electronics; Samsung Electronics; STMicroelectronics; AT&T
- Defunct: April 2011
- Headquarters: London, United Kingdom,
- Area served: Worldwide
- Products: The Symbian platform
- Website: symbian.org

The Symbian Foundation was a non-profit organisation that stewarded the Symbian operating system for mobile phones which previously had been owned and licensed by Symbian Ltd. Symbian Foundation never directly developed the platform, but evangelised, co-ordinated and ensured compatibility. It also provided key services to its members and the community such as collecting, building and distributing Symbian source code. During its time it competed against the Open Handset Alliance and the LiMo Foundation.

== Operational phase (2009-2010) ==
The Foundation was founded by Nokia, Sony Ericsson, NTT DoCoMo, Motorola, Texas Instruments, Vodafone, LG Electronics, Samsung Electronics, STMicroelectronics and AT&T. Due to a change in their device strategy, LG and Motorola left the Foundation board soon after its creation. They were later replaced by Fujitsu and Qualcomm Innovation Center.

During its operational phase (from 2009 to 2010), it also provided:

- platform development kits and tools
- documentation and example code
- discussion forums and mailing lists
- application signing (Symbian Signed)
- application distribution (Symbian Horizon)
- idea gathering and feedback (Symbian Ideas)
- an annual conference (Symbian Exchange and Exposition, abbreviated "SEE")

=== Members ===
The Symbian Foundation invited companies to join as members, and attracted over 200, from a large number of categories:

- Device manufacturers (e.g. Nokia, Fujitsu)
- Financial services companies (e.g. Visa)
- Semiconductor vendors (e.g. ARM, Broadcom)
- Mobile network operators (e.g. China Mobile, Vodafone, AT&T)
- Software companies
- Professional services firms

== Closure of Symbian Foundation ==
Following "a change in focus for some of [the] funding board members", the Symbian Foundation announced in November 2010 that it would transition to "a legal entity responsible for licensing software and other intellectual property", with no operational responsibilities or staff. The transition is a result of changes in global economic and market conditions (widely attributed to the stiff competition with other OS such as iOS and Android). Along with this announcement, Nokia announced it would take over governance of the Symbian platform. Nokia has been the major contributor to the code, and has been maintaining their own code repository for the platform development ever since the purchase of Symbian Ltd., regularly releasing their development to the public repository. On 17 December 2010 all Symbian Foundation public web sites, wiki and code repositories were shut down and Nokia launched a new Symbian site.

A GitHub organization named SymbianSource describes itself as hosting "Final repositories from the defunct Symbian Foundation"; its repositories include oss.FCL.sf.os.kernelhwsrv, which is labelled "Symbian OS Kernel".

However that year both Samsung and Sony Ericsson left the Foundation in favor of Google's Open Handset Alliance and the Android operating system, leaving Japan's NTT Docomo as the only major Nokia partner. Then with the announcement of Nokia's partnership with Microsoft in February 2011 and the transition to Windows Phone OS as the primary platform, the development of Symbian stopped and was outsourced to Accenture. Nokia closed this service at end of 2012.

After the transition completed in April 2011, the Symbian Foundation will remain as the trademark holder and licensing entity, and will only have non-executive directors involved.

The Symbian Foundation became legally insolvent, on the 15th April 2022, and it is currently unknown who the successor organisation is.
