= Personal FM transmitter =

Device for broadcasting radio signals

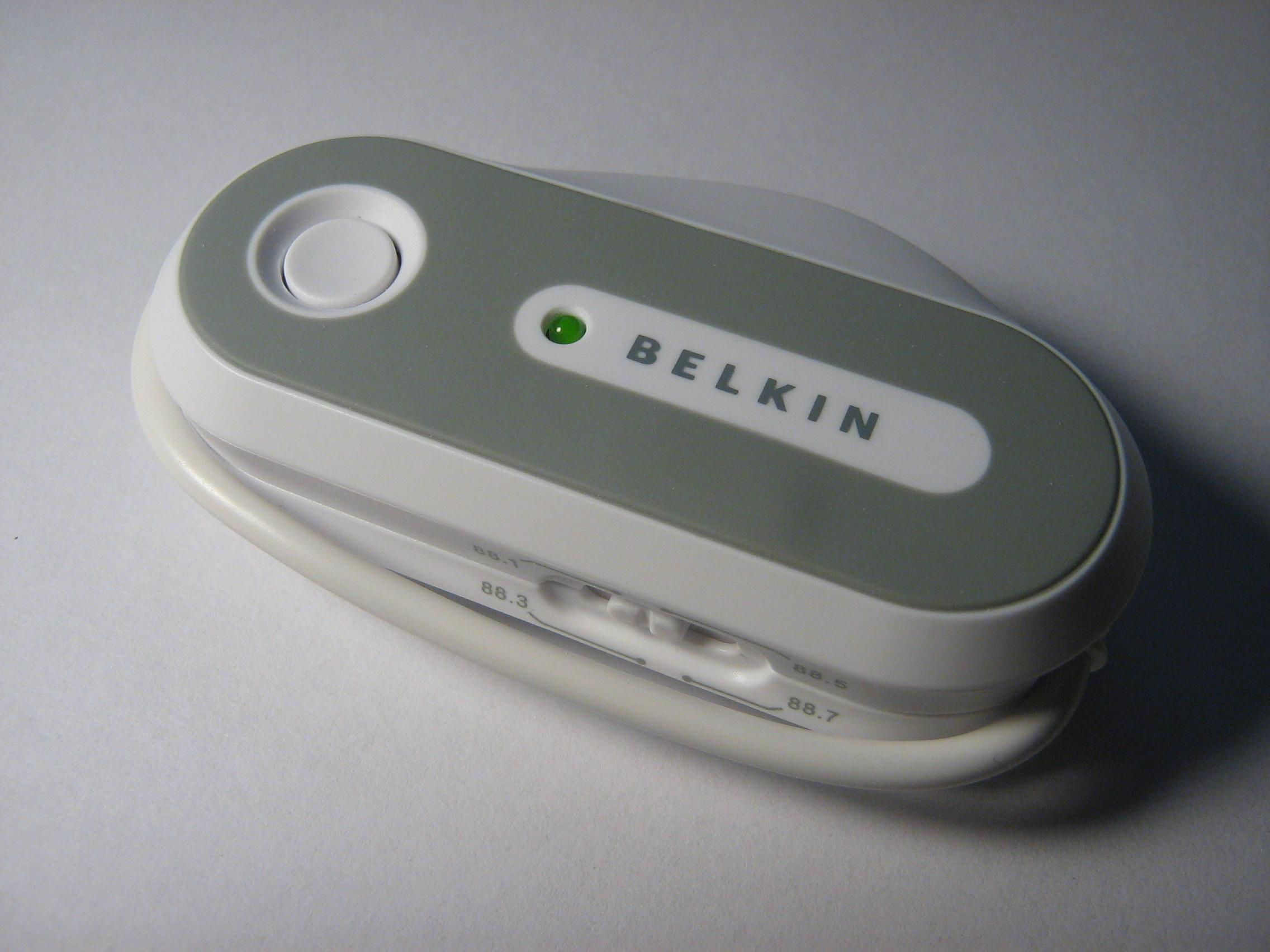
Belkin TuneCast transmitter, for use with any device which has a 3.5mm headphone jack. Frequency range is 88.1 - 88.3 - 88.5 - 88.7 MHz.

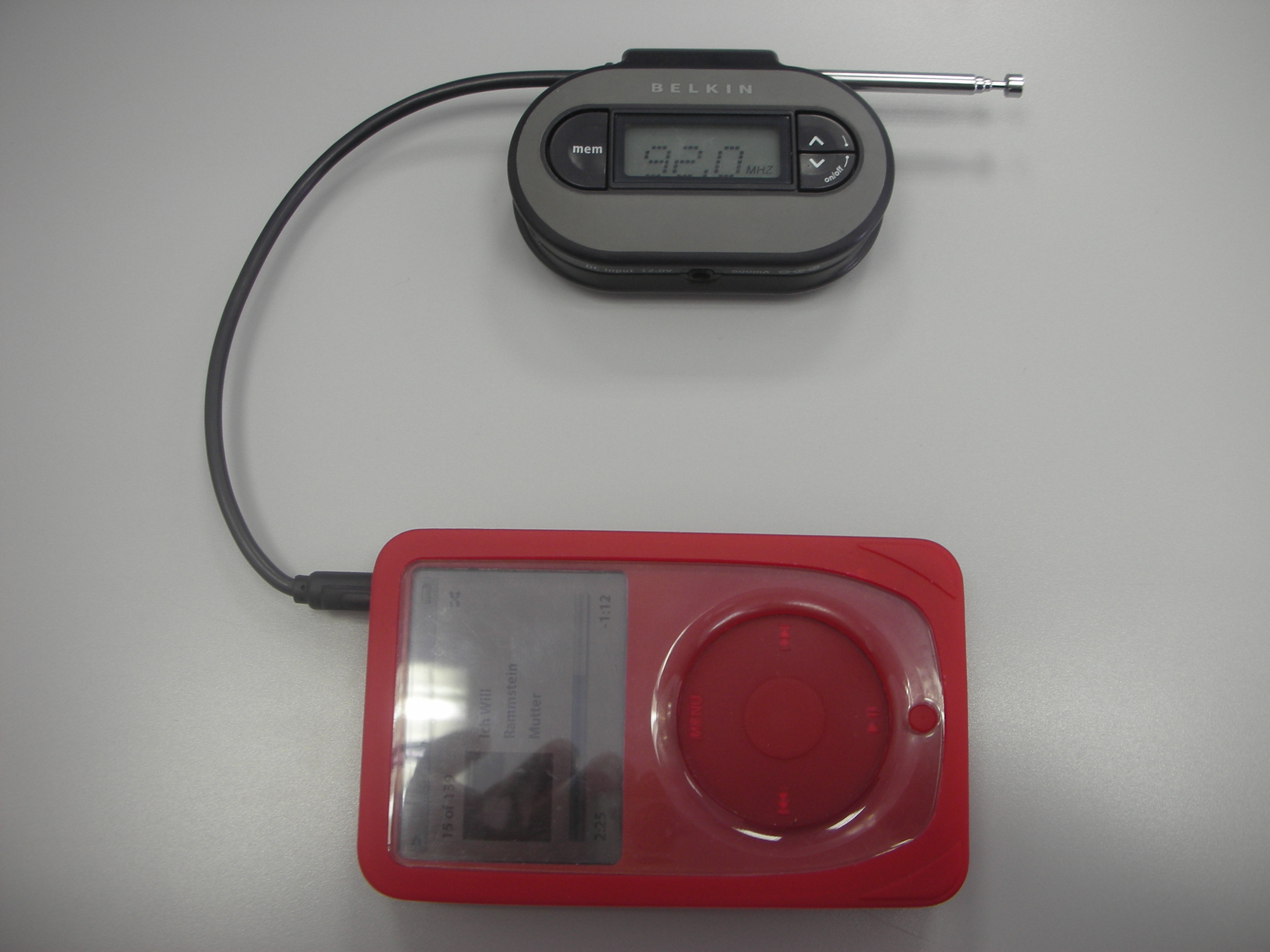
Belkin TuneCastII FM Transmitter with a modified antenna connected to an iPod music player

A personal FM transmitter is a low-power FM radio transmitter that broadcasts a signal from a portable audio device (such as an portable media player or a smartphone) to a standard FM radio. Most of these transmitters plug into the device's headphone jack and then broadcast the signal over an FM broadcast band frequency, so that it can be picked up by any nearby radio. Some FM transmitters have Bluetooth capabilities for use with smartphones. This allows portable audio devices to make use of the louder or better sound quality of a home audio system or car stereo without requiring a wired connection. They are often used in cars but may also be in fixed locations such as broadcasting from a computer sound card throughout a building.

Being low-powered, most transmitters typically have a short range of 100–300 feet (30–91 metres), depending on the quality of the receiver, obstructions and elevation. Typically they broadcast on any FM frequency from 87.5 to 108.0 MHz in most of the world, 76.0 - 95.0 MHz for Japan, 65.0 - 74.2 MHz for Russia, and 88.1 to 107.9 MHz in the US and Canada.

== Uses ==
Personal FM transmitters are commonly used as a workaround for playing portable audio devices on car radios that don't have an Auxiliary "AUX" input jack or Bluetooth audio connectivity. They are also used to broadcast a stationary audio source, like a computer or a television, around a home. They can also be used for low-power broadcasting and pirate radio but only to a very limited audience in near proximity. They can also be used as a "talking sign" in real estate sales or similar. Devices can be operated by connecting to the audio source or to a proprietary port of a specific device it is made for. In addition, certain devices such as hands-free car kits, navigation tools such as the TomTom GO, mobile phones like some Nokia Nseries models, and MP3 players may have FM transmitters built-in, however this has become uncommon.

== Legality ==
The legality and maximum permitted power levels or field strengths of these devices varies by country. In 2006, these devices became legal in most countries in the European Union.

In the UK, Statutory Instrument IR2030/26/2 2011/0401/UK (from December 2011) permits unlicensed use of devices that can be shown to radiate less than 50 nanowatts (-43 dBm), on a 0.2 MHz raster in the range 87.5–108 MHz.

Industry Canada permits transmitters that have an output lower than 100 μV/m at 30 metres (98 ft) (approximately 1 microwatt output). However, an exception is made for "personal radiocommunication transmitters providing short range transmissions to nearby FM receivers (e.g. FM transmitters integrated in MP3 players) ... without a license."

In the United States, Part 15 of the U.S. Federal Communications Commission rules specifies that no license is needed if range of the transmitter does not exceed 200 feet (61 meters), although the Part 15 rules specify that the field strength should not exceed 250 μV/m (48 dB) at 3 meters, which is less than the service contour for commercial stations (60 dB), necessary for the satisfactory reception of FM stereo.

In Japan, no license is needed for devices with a signal strength of less than 500 μV/m at 3 meters.

== See also ==
- FM broadcasting
- Frequency modulation
- Microbroadcasting
- Part 15 of the FCC rules regarding unlicensed broadcasting
- Pirate radio
- Portable audio player
