= Psion Siena =

Personal digital assistant

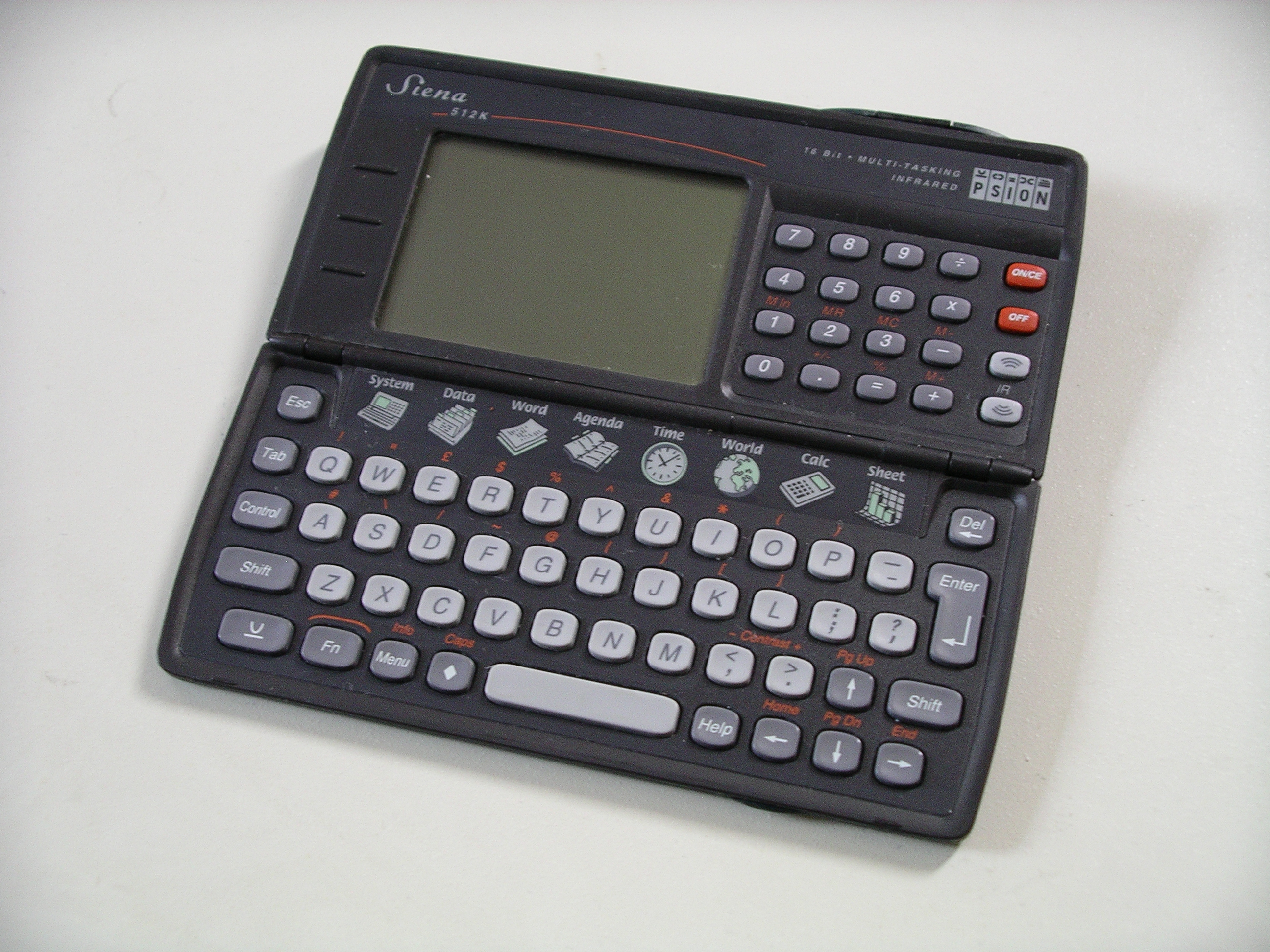
- Psion Siena 512k with lid open
- Developer: Psion PLC
- Manufacturer: Psion PLC
- Product family: Psion Series 3
- Type: PDA
- Generation: 3
- Released: 1996; 30 years ago
- Lifespan: 1996–?
- Media: Psion Solid State Disks (optional) connected via RS-232 port
- Operating system: EPOC16 (SIBO)
- CPU: NEC V30H @ 7.68 MHz
- Display: 240 × 160 monochrome LCD
- Input: QWERTY keyboard Numeric keypad Microphone
- Camera: N/A
- Touchpad: N/A
- Connectivity: Serial, 19,200 bit/s RS-232C
- Power: 2 × AAA battery
- Predecessor: Psion Series 3
- Successor: Psion Revo
- Related: Psion Series 5
- Language: Open Programming Language

The Psion Siena is a personal digital assistant made by Psion PLC and was released in 1996. Two versions were released, one with 512 kB of memory and a second with 1 MB.

The main power is provided by two AAA batteries and the backup power by one cell-style CR1620 battery. The batteries are held in a compartment below a detachable casing in the top of the device. It has no socket for an external power source.

The Siena was of the same generation as the Psion Series 3 but it has a smaller size liquid-crystal display (LCD, 240 x 160 pixels) and a separate numeric keypad next to the screen. The Siena uses the same 16-bit NEC V30H processor as its predecessor the Series 3a. Although the Siena shares binary compatibility with the Series 3, many programs had to be modified due to the reduced sizes of memory and display.

Unlike the Series 3, the Siena has no bay for removable solid state disk drives; however, an external drive device is available which connects via an RS-232 serial port. That port also provides PC connectivity if used with the separately available PsiWin software and dial up access via the Travel modem accessory. More connectivity was available via the included infrared port, next to the serial port.

== In popular culture ==
The device was used as a model for a gadget in Anarky (vol.1) #3, Metamorphosis: The Economics of The Madhouse, a DC Comics book. The character, Anarky, is seen tracking Batman's movements using the small PDA.
