= Psion netBook =

Subnotebook computer

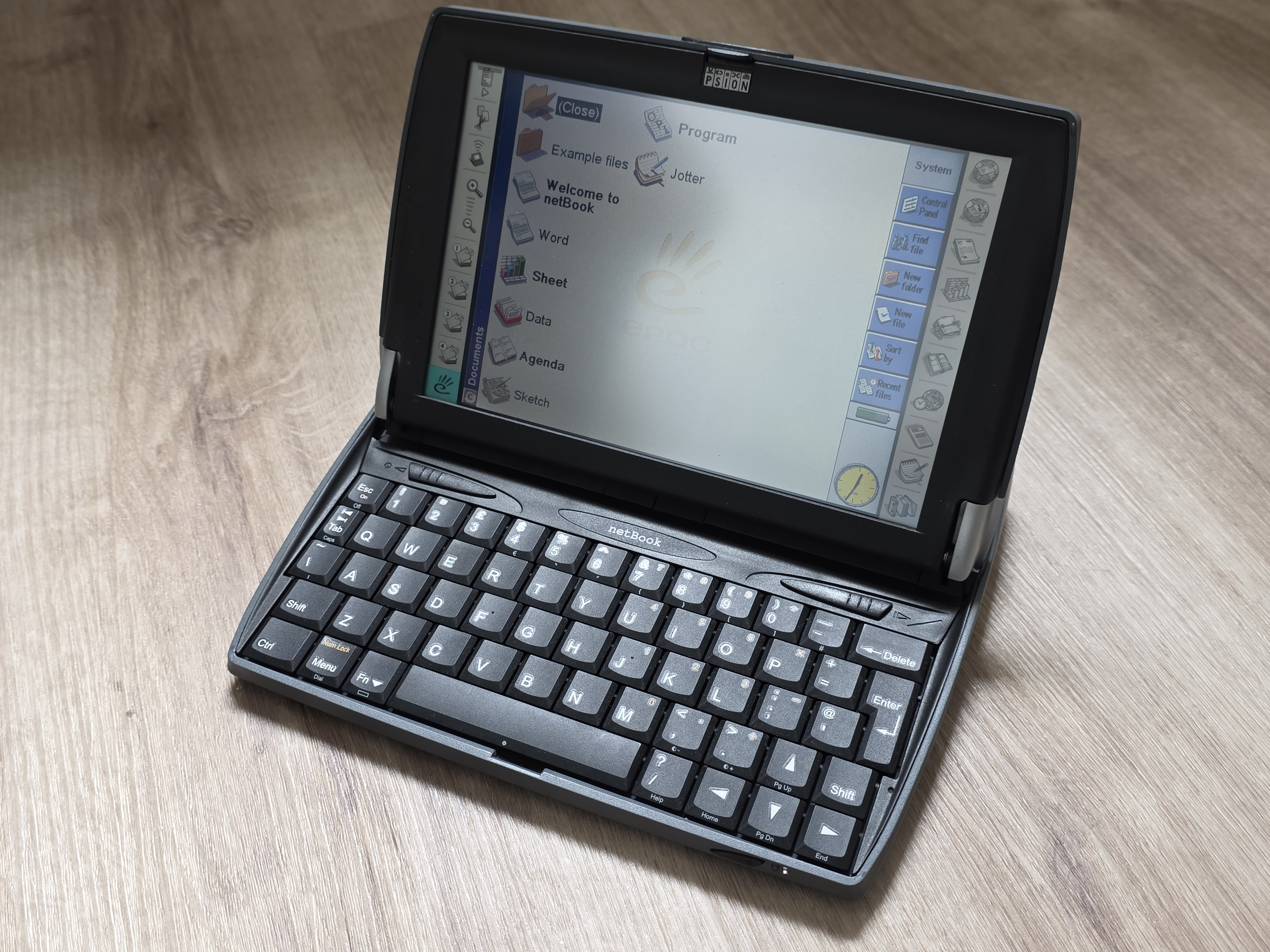
- Psion netBook
- Developer: Psion PLC
- Manufacturer: Psion PLC
- Product family: Psion netBook
- Type: Subnotebook
- Generation: 4
- Released: 1999; 27 years ago
- Lifespan: 1999–?
- Operating system: EPOC32
- CPU: StrongARM SA-1100 190 MHz; Intel XScale PXA255 400 MHz
- Memory: 32, 64, 128 MB
- Removable storage: CF II (Microdrive), PC Card
- Display: VGA or SVGA
- Input: QWERTY keyboard, microphone
- Connectivity: RS-232 serial port
- Marketing target: businesses
- Predecessor: Psion Series 5
- Language: Open Programming Language

The Psion netBook is a small subnotebook computer developed by Psion. Released in 1999, it was for the mobile enterprise market.

== Description ==
Similar in design to the later, consumer-oriented Psion Series 7, the netBook has a clamshell design, a Video Graphics Array (VGA) resolution touch-sensitive colour screen, 32 MB random-access memory (RAM), 190 MHz StrongARM SA-1100 processor and a QWERTY computer keyboard. The RAM is upgradeable by adding an extra 32 MB chip. The netBook is powered by a removable rechargeable lithium-ion battery, giving a battery life of 8 to 10 hours.

In October 2003, Psion Teklogix announced the NetBook Pro, replacing the original netBook. This was similar to the earlier model, but upgraded with a 16-bit colour Super VGA (SVGA, 800 × 600 pixel) display, 128 MB of RAM, and a 400 MHz Intel XScale PXA255 processor running Windows CE .NET Framework 4.2 instead of EPOC. It is also possible to run Linux on this model.

An open-source project OpenPsion, formerly PsiLinux, ported Linux to the Psion netBook and other Psion PDAs.

== Included software ==
- Agenda – a personal information management program
- Bombs – a minesweeper game
- Calc – a calculator
- Comms – a terminal emulator
- Contacts – a contacts manager
- Data – a flat-file database program
- Email – an email, SMS and fax client
- Jotter – a multipage scratchpad
- NetStatRF – a Wi-Fi card monitor
- Program – an Open Programming Language (OPL) editor
- Record – a voice recording program, for use with the in-built microphone
- Sheet – a spreadsheet and graphing package
- Sketch – a drawing program (for use with the touch-screen interface)
- Spell – a spellchecker, thesaurus and anagram program
- Time – a world clock and alarm program
- Opera – a web browser
- Word – a word processor

== The Netbook trademark ==
Psion registered the trademark NETBOOK in various territories, including the European Union and U.S. Trademark 75,215,401, which was applied for on 18 December 1996 and registered by the United States Patent and Trademark Office (USPTO) on 21 November 2000. They used this trademark for the netBook product, discontinued in November 2003, and from October 2003, the NETBOOK PRO, later also discontinued.

Intel began the use of the term netbook in March 2008 as a generic term to describe "small laptops that are designed for wireless communication and access to the Internet", believing they were "not offering a branded line of computers here" and "see no naming conflict".

In response to the growing use of this term, on 23 December 2008, Psion Teklogix sent cease and desist letters to various parties including enthusiast website(s) demanding they no longer use the term "netbook".

During the twelve years since Psion first lodged the original netbook trademark, the term had become perceived as sufficiently generic that later derivative marks were rejected by the USPTO citing a "likelihood of confusion" under section 2(d), including "G NETBOOK" (U.S. Trademark 77,527,311 rejected 31 October 2008), MSI's "WIND NETBOOK" (U.S. Trademark 77,580,272) and Coby Electronics' "COBY NETBOOK" (U.S. Trademark 77,590,174 rejected 13 January 2009).
