= P.A. Semi =

Former American semiconductor company

P.A. Semi Inc.
- Formerly: Palo Alto Semiconductor
- Industry: Fabless semiconductor company
- Founded: 2003
- Founder: Daniel W. Dobberpuhl
- Defunct: 2008
- Fate: Acquired by Apple
- Headquarters: Santa Clara, California, United States
- Products: PWRficient processor
- Number of employees: 150 person engineering team
- Website: pasemi.com at the Wayback Machine (archived September 27, 2007)

P. A. Semi (originally Palo Alto Semiconductor) was an American fabless semiconductor company founded in Santa Clara, California in 2003 by Daniel W. Dobberpuhl, who was previously the lead designer for the DEC Alpha 21064 and StrongARM processors. The company employed a 150-person engineering team including Jim Keller, which included people who had previously worked on processors like Itanium, Opteron and UltraSPARC. Apple Inc acquired P.A. Semi for $278 million in April 2008.

P.A. Semi developed the PWRficient PA6T-1682M CPU, which was used in the AmigaOne X1000.

== History ==
P. A. Semi concentrated on making powerful and power-efficient Power ISA processors called PWRficient, based on the PA6T processor core. The PA6T was the first Power ISA core to be designed from scratch outside the AIM alliance (i.e. not by Apple, IBM, or Motorola/Freescale) in ten years. Texas Instruments was one of the investors in P.A. Semi and it was suggested that its fabrication plants would be used to manufacture the PWRficient processors.

The PA6T is PowerPC v2.04 compatible. The PA6T is a deeply pipelined, out of order, superscalar core.

PWRficient processors were shipping to select customers, and were set to be released for worldwide sale in Q4 2007.

There were rumors that P. A. Semi had a relationship with Apple that suggested Apple would be the premier user of the PWRficient processors. That relationship supposedly ended with the Mac transition to Intel processors when Apple switched from the PowerPC to Intel's Core processors for its entire line of computers. Therefore, when P. A. Semi first publicly disclosed PWRficient, the company instead targeted embedded systems, such as networking equipment.

== Acquisition by Apple ==
On 23 April 2008, Apple announced that it had acquired P. A. Semi for $278 million. The acquisition came with P.A. Semi's 150-person engineering team. While Apple's previous relationship with P. A. Semi would indicate that Apple could use their processors, P. A. Semi manufactures only Power ISA processors, which Apple did not use at the time.

On 11 June 2008, during the annual Worldwide Developer's Conference, Apple CEO Steve Jobs said that the acquisition was meant to add the talent of P. A. Semi's engineers to Apple's workforce and help them build custom chips for the iPod, iPhone, and other future mobile devices such as the iPad. P.A. Semi has said that it was willing to supply its PWRficient PA6T-1682M chip on an end-of-life basis, if the Power ISA license that P.A. Semi holds from IBM could be transferred to the acquiring company.

== Legacy ==
The acquisition became the foundation of Apple's in-house chip design. P.A. Semi's engineering team was absorbed into a silicon group led by Johny Srouji, and Apple began shipping its own custom processors in 2010 with the Apple A4 system on a chip used in the iPad and iPhone 4. The work developed into Apple's A-series mobile chips and, from 2020, the Apple silicon M-series that powers Mac computers.
