= Psion Series 7 =

Notebook computer from Psion

- Developer: Psion PLC
- Manufacturer: Psion PLC
- Product family: Psion netBook
- Type: Subnotebook
- Released: 2000; 26 years ago
- Operating system: EPOC32
- CPU: StrongARM SA-1100
- Memory: 16 – 32 MB
- Removable storage: CF II (Microdrive), PC Card
- Display: VGA
- Input: QWERTY keyboard, microphone
- Connectivity: RS-232 serial port
- Marketing target: consumers
- Predecessor: Psion Series 5
- Language: Open Programming Language

The Psion Series 7 is a subnotebook computer from Psion that was released in 2000. In size it is fairly original: larger than a palmtop or handheld machine, but smaller than a laptop computer. It was the first and last of the Psion series to have a full color electronic visual display. It has a leather-bound clamshell design, with a touch-sensitive, Video Graphics Array (VGA) resolution liquid-crystal display (LCD) and QWERTY computer keyboard. Internally it has a 132.71 MHz StrongARM SA-1100 processor, 16 (upgradable to 32) megabyte (MB) of random-access memory (RAM) and 16 MB of internal read-only memory (ROM).

The machine runs the EPOC operating system (OS), a predecessor of Symbian OS, and as such, can be programmed in the Open Programming Language (OPL), using the provided development program, or in C++ or Java, using a separate personal computer (PC) hosted development system. It can be synchronized to a PC by means of an RS-232 serial port to serial connector, a method that is obsoleted by later standards.

The unit has an expansion port for a CompactFlash (CF) II device such as the Hitachi Microdrive. It also has a PC Card expansion port supporting flash storage, compact flash adapters, modems, wireless and GPS adapters. For data transfer between Psion computers, printers and to use mobile phones as modems the Series 7 features IrDA (infrared) connectivity.

The Series 7 is a variant of the Psion netBook, a machine aimed at the corporate market. Due to customer demand, the reduced capacity Series 7 was released, distinguished by replacing 16 MB of the 32 MB of RAM with a 16 MB ROM chip. Accessing the OS in ROM required slowing the processor down, leading to the false perception that the netBook and Series 7 used a different processor or printed circuit board (PCB). It is thus possible to convert a Series 7 to netBook configuration by replacing this memory card. However, at least two different (interchangeable) PCBs were used during the product's lifecycle, the later PCB distinguished by higher power output to the PC Card.

== Included software ==
- Agenda – a personal information management program
- Bombs – a minesweeper game
- Calc – a calculator
- Comms – a terminal emulator
- Contacts – a contacts manager
- Data – a flat-file database program
- Email – an email, SMS, and fax client
- Jotter – a multipage scratchpad
- Program – an Open Programming Language (OPL) program editor
- Record – a voice recording program, for use with the in-built microphone
- Sheet – a spreadsheet and graphing package
- Sketch – a drawing program (for use with the touch-screen interface)
- Spell – a spellchecker, thesaurus and anagram program
- Time – a world clock and alarm program
- Web – a web browser
- Word – a word processor

== Linux on the Series 7 ==
An open source project OpenPsion, formerly PsiLinux, aims to port Linux to the Psion Series 7, netBook, and other Psion PDAs. Linux on the Series 7 rather struggles, given the Series 7's limited resources, but most PC Card (16-bit) adapters seem to be supported.

== See also ==
- Psion (company)
- Psion Organiser
- Psion Series 3
- Psion Series 5
