= Psion Series 3 =

Series of personal digital assistants

Psion Series 3a
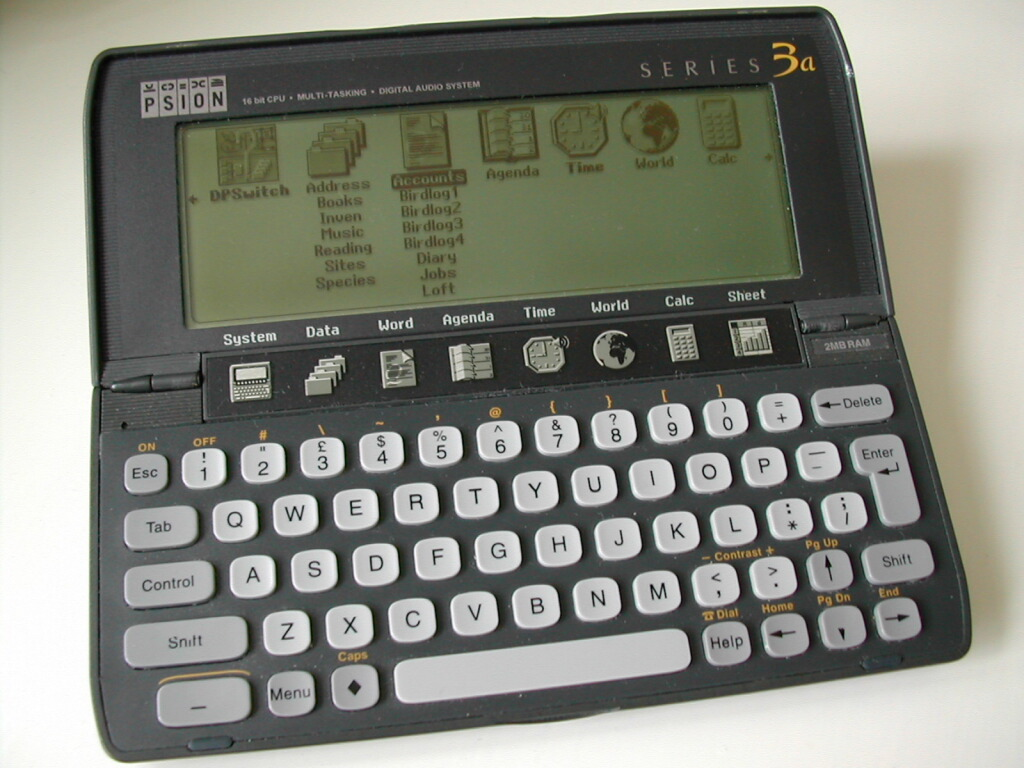
- A Psion Series 3a
- Developer: Psion PLC
- Manufacturer: Psion PLC
- Type: PDA
- Generation: 3
- Released: 1991; 35 years ago
- Lifespan: 1991–1998
- Introductory price: £179 (128 kB), £249 (256 kB)
- Discontinued: 1998; 28 years ago
- Units sold: 1.5 million
- Media: Psion Solid State Disks
- Operating system: EPOC16 (SIBO)
- CPU: NEC V30H @ 7.68 MHz
- Display: 480 × 160 monochrome LCD, 13.1 cm (5.2 in)
- Input: QWERTY keyboard microphone
- Camera: N/A
- Touchpad: N/A
- Connectivity: Serial, 19,200 bit/s RS-232C
- Power: 2 × AA battery
- Dimensions: 165 mm × 85 mm × 22 mm (6.50 in × 3.35 in × 0.87 in)
- Predecessor: Psion Organiser
- Successor: Psion Revo
- Related: Psion Siena, Psion Series 5
- Language: Open Programming Language

The Psion Series 3 range of personal digital assistants were made by Psion PLC. The four main variants are the Psion Series 3 (1991), the Psion Series 3a (1993), the Psion Series 3c (1996), and the Psion Series 3mx (1998), all sized 165 by 85 by 22 millimetres (6.50 in × 3.35 in × 0.87 in). Further, a Psion Series 3a variant with factory installed software for the Russian language was called a Psion Series 3aR, and Acorn Computers sold renamed versions of the Psion Series 3 and 3a marketed as the Acorn Pocket Book and Acorn Pocket Book II.

The Psion Series 3 range was regarded in 2009 by writer Charles Stross as an unsurpassed PDA because of its long battery life (20 to 35 hours), its stable and versatile software, and its durable hardware. Others describe over twenty years of daily use with models such as the Psion 3mx. About 1.5 million Psion 3s were made. The prices were 128 kB at £179 (equivalent to £412 in 2025) and 256 kB at £249 (equivalent to £573 in 2025).

The Psion Series 3 models were a major advance on the Psion Organiser. They had an original way of managing files: the available program icons are shown in a horizontal line and the associated files display in a drop-down list beneath them. Manufacture of Psion 3s was discontinued in 1998 shortly after the launch of the Psion Series 5 (a Psion Series 4 does not exist, due to Psion's concern of tetraphobia in their Asian markets) and the Psion Siena. Psion's industrial hardware division continue to produce handhelds running the same 16-bit operating system, some 17 years after its introduction on the Psion MC range of laptops and 5 years after Psion Computer's final 32-bit EPOC PDA was released.

All Series 3 variants are powered by two AA battery cells and an internal backup battery, a small button cell. All have a DC input socket for optional external power-supply via a mains transformer AC adapter.

The Series 3's clamshell design had some problems, including breakages of any of the four hinges; loss of function in the button bar between the two halves of the clam; and deterioration of the cable linking the keyboard half to the screen, leading to a serious display problem with vertical lines appearing.

Psion Series 3s have room for two flash memory cards, which enabled backup of data. Psion, Acorn and third party software was available loaded onto such memory cards which were available as separate packs.

The Series 3 featured a tone dialing feature using a combination of its built-in loudspeaker and dedicated software for generating DTMF tones suitable for telephone systems. It could be used to dial a telephone number by holding the device to the mouthpiece of a tone dialing telephone. The tone dialing feature was integrated into the Psion's Agenda, Contacts and Data applications.

One unique feature of the Psion Series 3 software package was a built-in programming language, Organiser then Open Programming Language (OPL), which enabled users to create their own applications that ran and looked just as system programs. This, along with the rise in popularity of forums such as Compuserve and CIX, led to a significant shareware scene, archived by Steve Litchfield and the 3-Lib shareware library, begun in 1994.

The Embeddable Linux Kernel Subset project has produced a small subset of Linux that runs on the Series 3a.

== Psion Series 3 ==
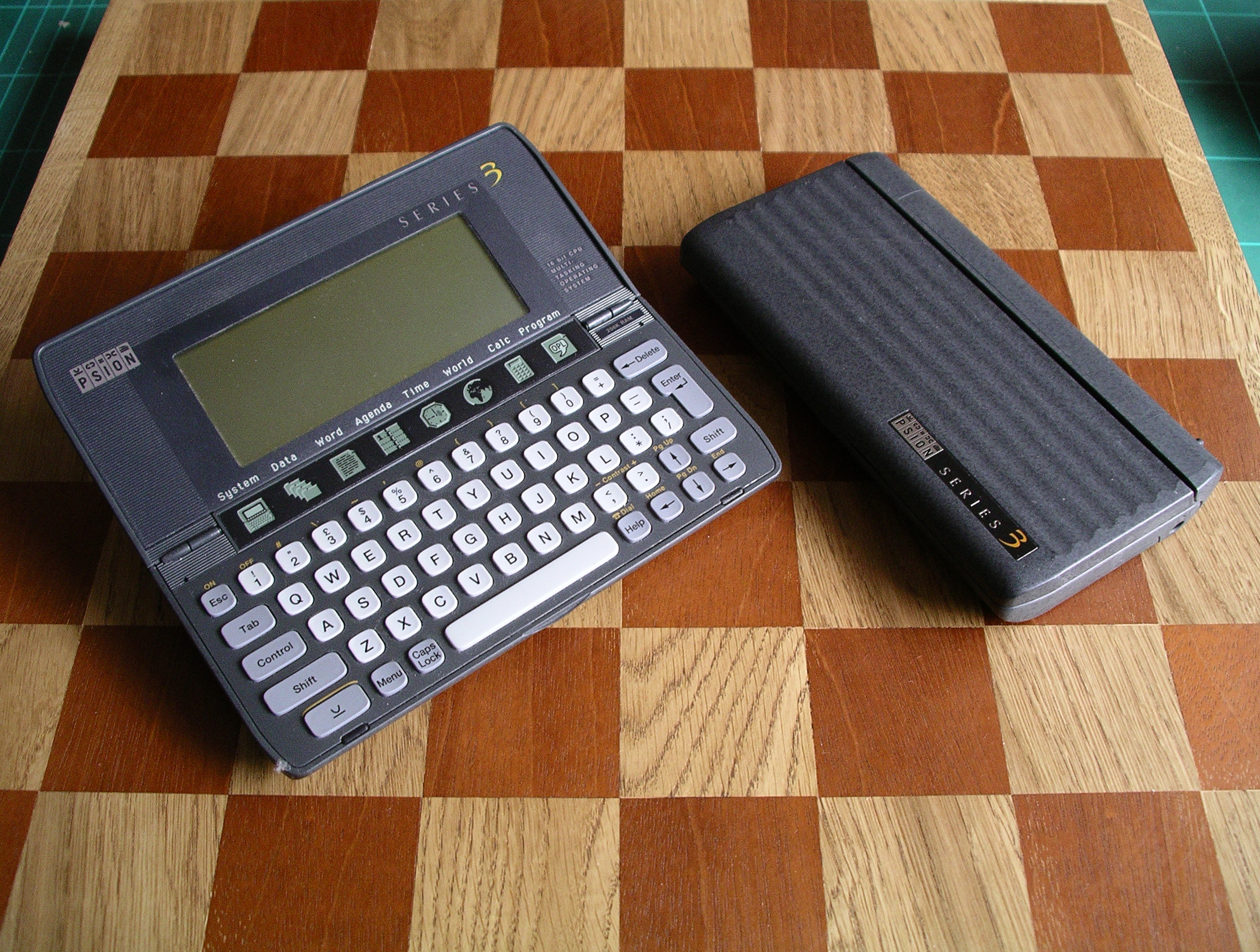
Psion Series 3, (on 5 cm squares)

The Psion Series 3 was an early example of a personal digital assistant (PDA). It had an agenda with multiple views, a database, a word processor, world times, and other features. With an optional modem, it could connect to the Internet for very basic web browsing and email functionality through the official Psi Mail app. It could be programmed in Organiser Programming Language (OPL), which enabled access to menu and computer graphics functions. The Series 3 had a 240×80 pixel screen of 97 by 39 millimetres (3.8 in × 1.5 in). The backup battery for the Series 3 is a CR1620.

== Acorn Pocket Book ==
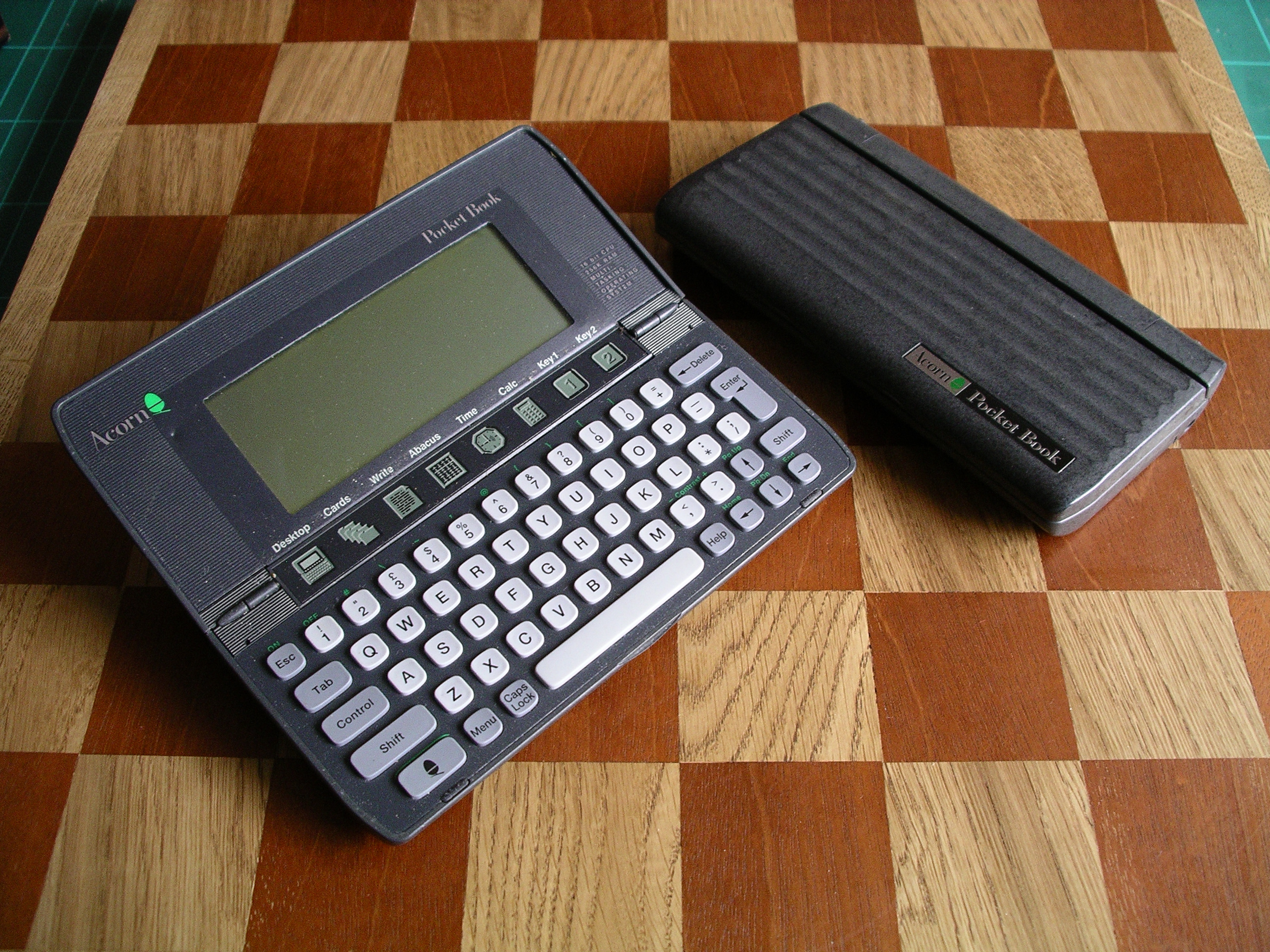
Acorn Pocket Book

The Acorn Pocket Book was based on the Series 3 with slightly different on-board software, and marketed by Acorn Computers as a low cost computer for schoolchildren, rather than as an executive tool. The hardware was the same as the Series 3, but the integrated applications were different; for example, the Pocket Book omitted the Agenda diary application, which became an optional install from floppy diskette. Other programs were renamed: System became Desktop, Word became Write, Sheet became Abacus and Data became Cards.

== Psion Series 3a ==
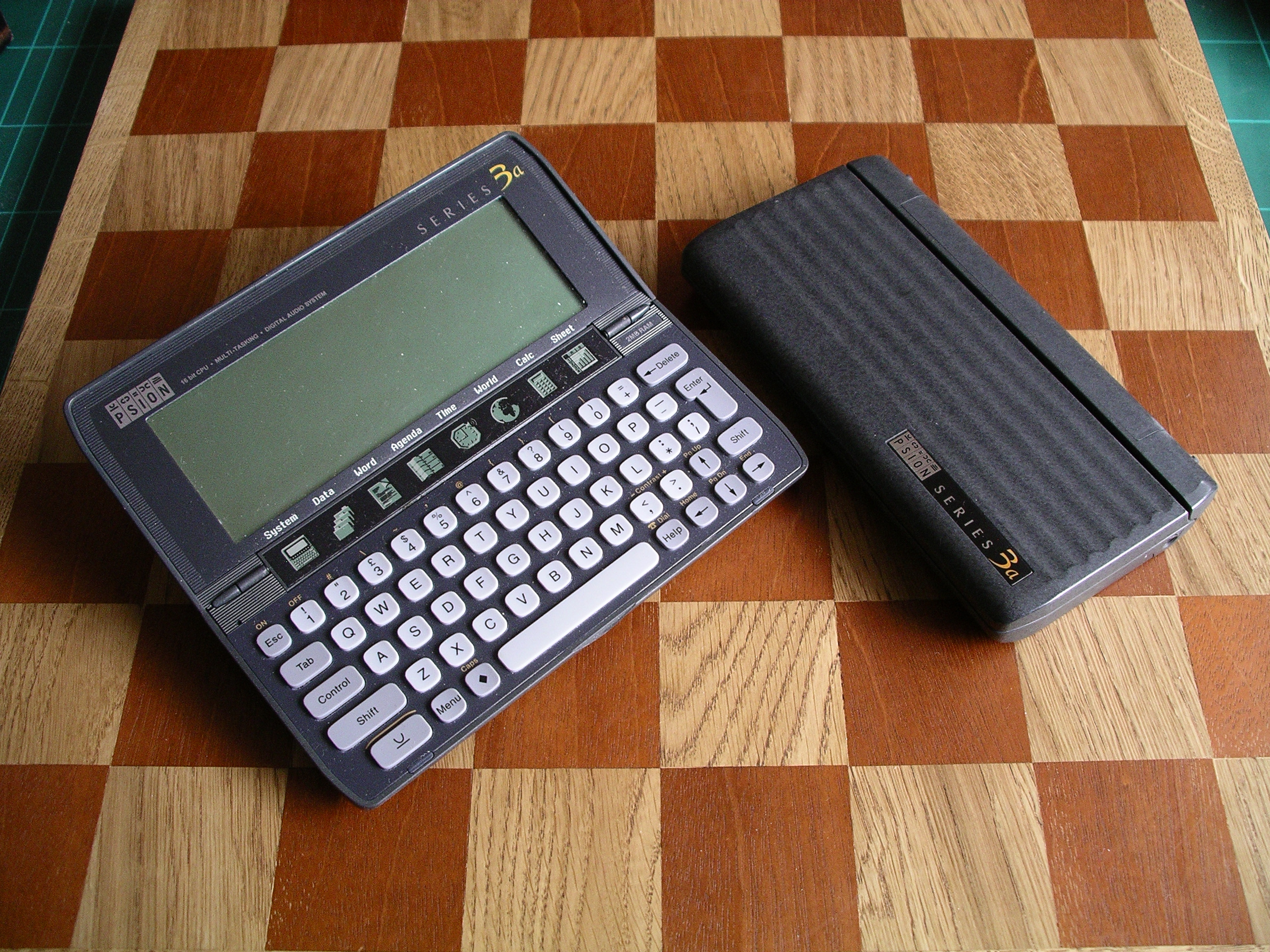
Psion 3a

The Psion Series 3a has a 67% larger screen than the Series 3. This new screen also had an increased resolution of 480 x 160 and an intermediate "grey plane" which allowed it to display grey in addition to black and white tones. Software designed for the Series 3 would run in a compatibility mode that reproduced the lower resolution of the earlier model, thus preserving the on-screen appearance of such software. The additional resolution made it possible for applications like communications terminals to show 80-column displays on screen in their entirety, as well as facilitating different zoom levels in applications, and giving additional detail to text fonts. Another significant upgrade was to the audio capabilities, introducing the audio recording and playback capabilities demonstrated by the Psion MC series, although no compression was performed on recorded audio which would consume 8 KB of memory per second.

The Series 3a has a NEC V30H CPU (running at 7.68 MHz and thereby twice as fast as the Series 3), a microphone for voice recording, an input/output (I/O) port (for modem, printing and PC synchronization), and 256 kB, 512 kB, 1 MB or 2 MB of random-access memory (RAM). The increased power consumption of the faster processor and larger screen was mitigated by using a lower-voltage version of the V30H, leaving the stated battery life unchanged at 80 hours. The backup battery for the Series 3a is a CR1620. The Psion Series 3a range was revised in 1995 to include models with 1 MB or 2 MB of RAM and more software was factory preloaded into the ROM. This included a spell checker and thesaurus, communication software, games and more, though all of these had been available formerly as optional extras (or in the case of the comms software, as a program loaded from the ROM of the 3Link serial connector) for earlier models.

== Acorn Pocket Book II ==
As a successor to its slightly-modified Pocket Book, Acorn also produced a renamed Series 3a known as the Pocket Book II. This added back some of the applications omitted from the original Pocket Book, so was closer in specification to the standard Psion model. For example, Psion's Agenda application was renamed Schedule, and a new Plotter application (graph-plotting software) was added. The Pocket Book II came in either 256 kB, 512 kB or 1 MB variants.

== Psion Series 3aR ==
There was also a modification of the Series 3a for the Russian market named Psion Series 3aR, which had software factory installed directly in the read-only memory (ROM) for the Russian language. All the other Series 3 models had software for the English language factory installed and localization required installation of localization software, which was bundled in the box with the Psion palmtop.

== Psion Series 3c ==
Psion Series 3c

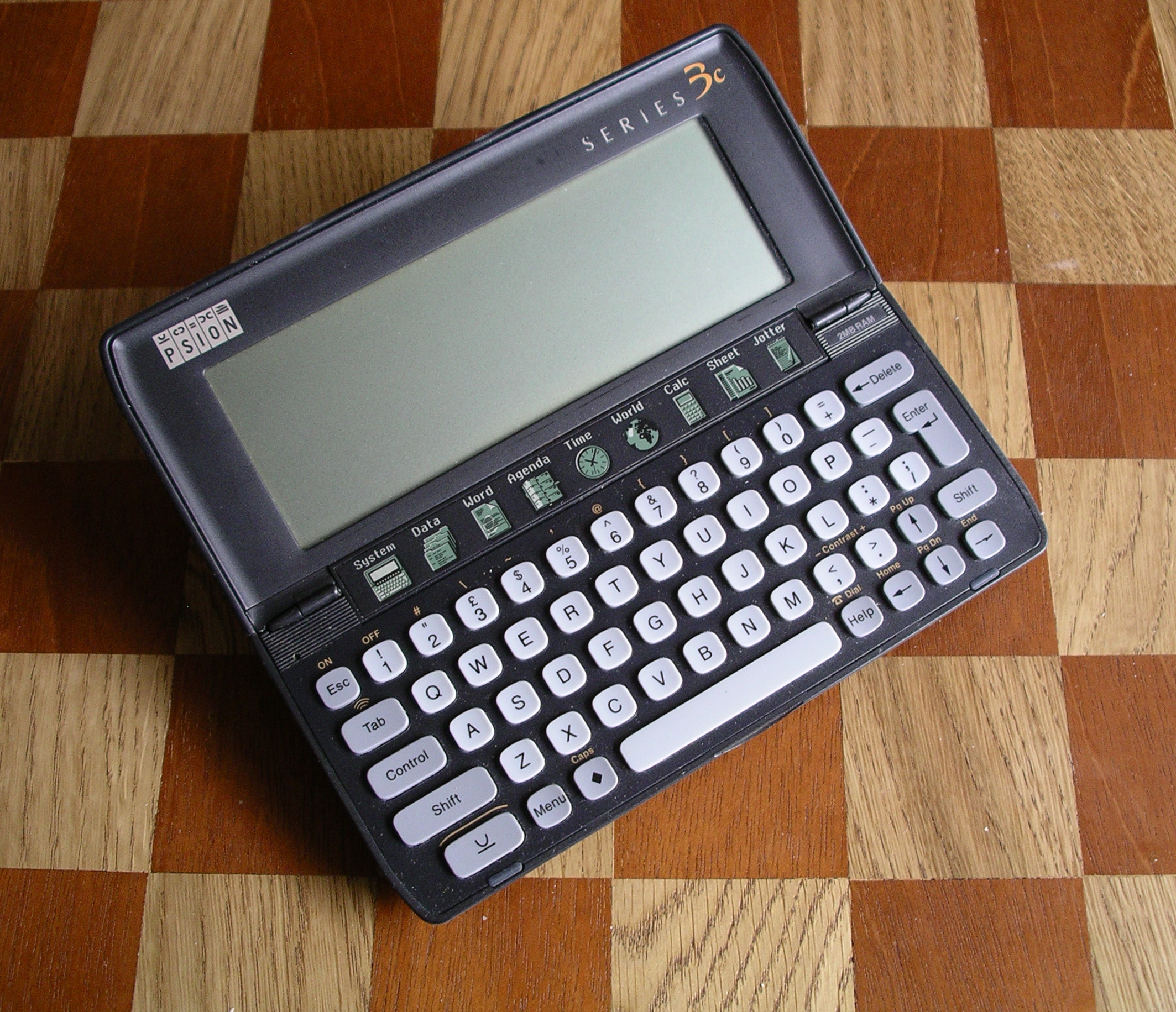
3c open

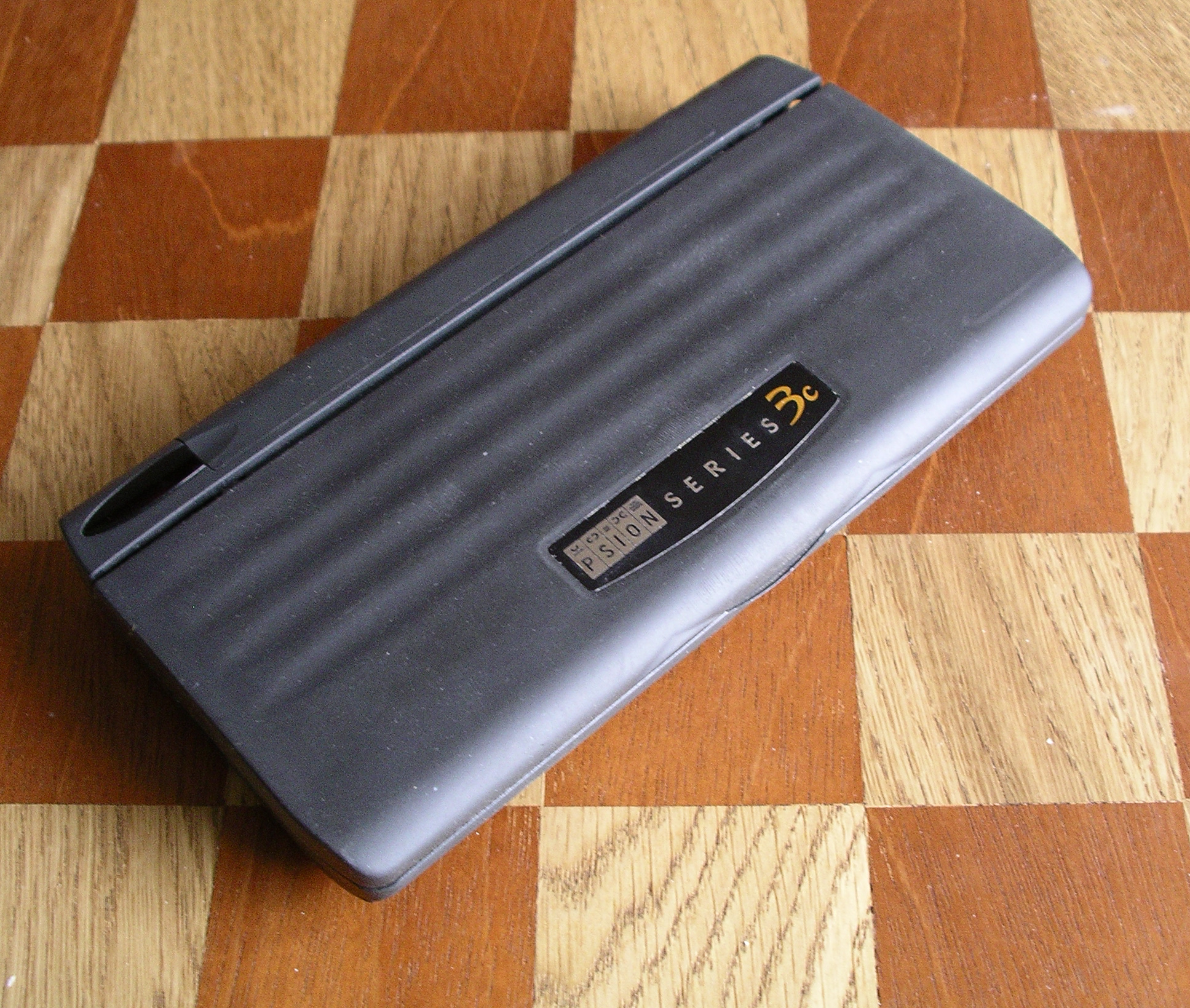
3c closed; the infrared port is on the left part of device

The Psion Series 3c was the next variant after the Psion Series 3a; the company did not release a Psion Series 3b. It has a slightly different external appearance to the earlier variants because a redesigned badge is placed centrally on the lid, the lid has fewer undulations, and a port for an infrared connection is visible. The plastic case is painted matte dark grey. The Series 3c comes with 1 or 2 MB internal RAM. The main differences between the Series 3a and 3c apart from the infrared port are some modifications of the built-in software and the serial port has been changed (the same as on the Siena). A serial cable is provided, that allows the direct connection to a Windows-PC. The Series 3c has a backlit screen (same resolution as the 3a). The backup battery for the Series 3c is a CR1620.

The Series 3c, and the later 3mx, have an Easter Egg.

== Psion Series 3mx ==
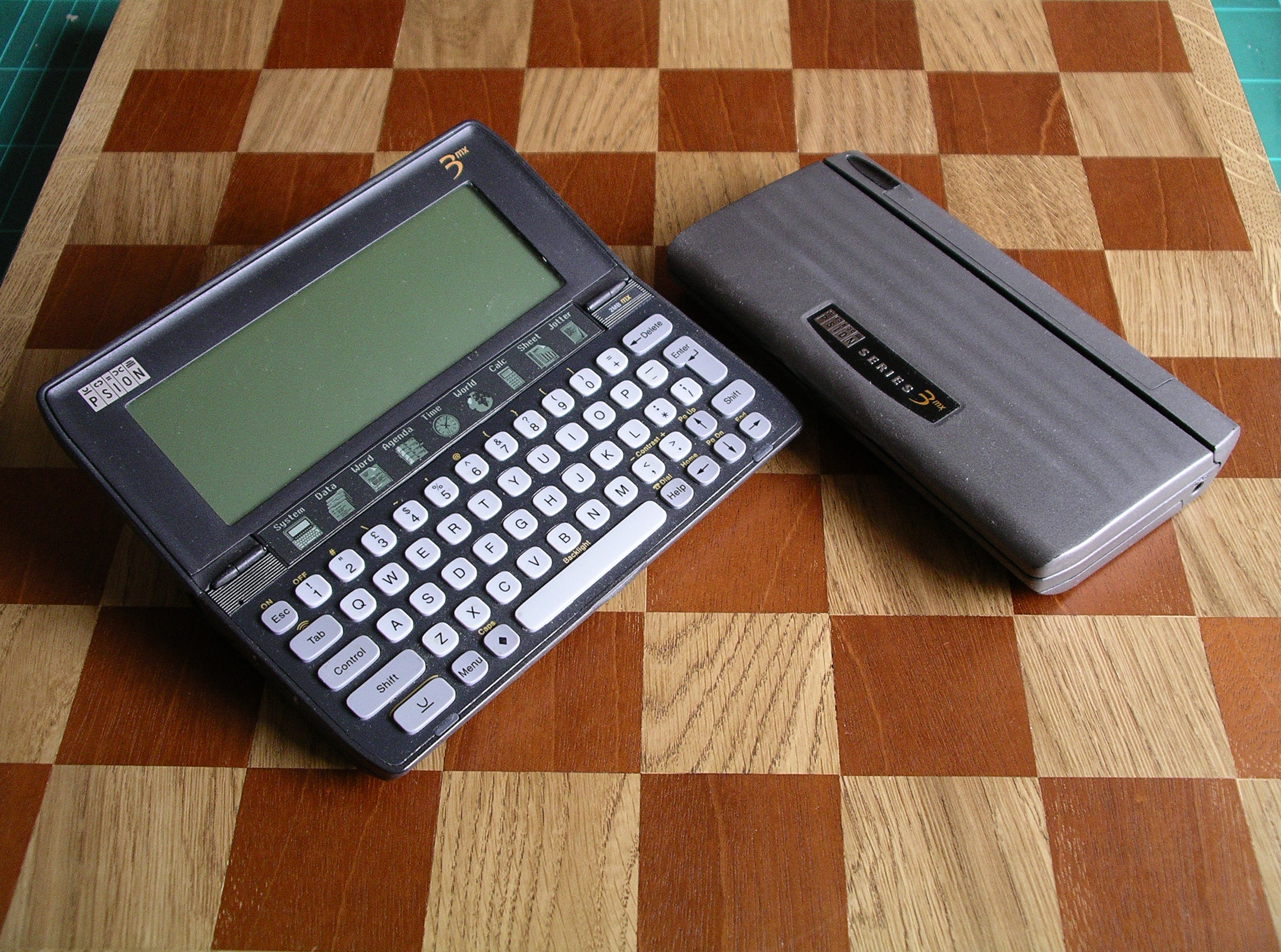
Psion 3mx

The Psion Series 3mx was the last upgrade in the popular 16-bit (SIBO) Series 3 line. Announced in July 1998, after the release of the 32-bit (EPOC) Psion Series 5, the 3mx is essentially an upgraded Series 3c. The 3mx comes in two models: 1 MB and 2 MB.

The Psion Series 3mx and Series 3c have a similar overall external appearance, except the 3mx sports a matte silver metallic paint covering, rather than the dark grey finish of the 3c. The Series 3mx has a faster processor, a 16-bit NEC V30MX (80C86 compatible) running at 27.684 MHz, and a faster RS232c connection, which was boosted to 115 kbit/s. All models of the Series 3mx came with a backlit screen, also some 3cs (mainly for the USA market) had backlit screens. The Series 3mx takes a CR2025 backup battery. Like many other Series 3 models, the 3mx uses an infrared port which can be used to transfer data between two devices.

The ability to browse the World Wide Web on the device was also available through the STNC HitchHiker mobile browser, although it was only available for use with an external modem. Due to the monochrome (black and white) screen, this was often not the most practical way to browse the web.

== Accessories ==
=== Software packs ===
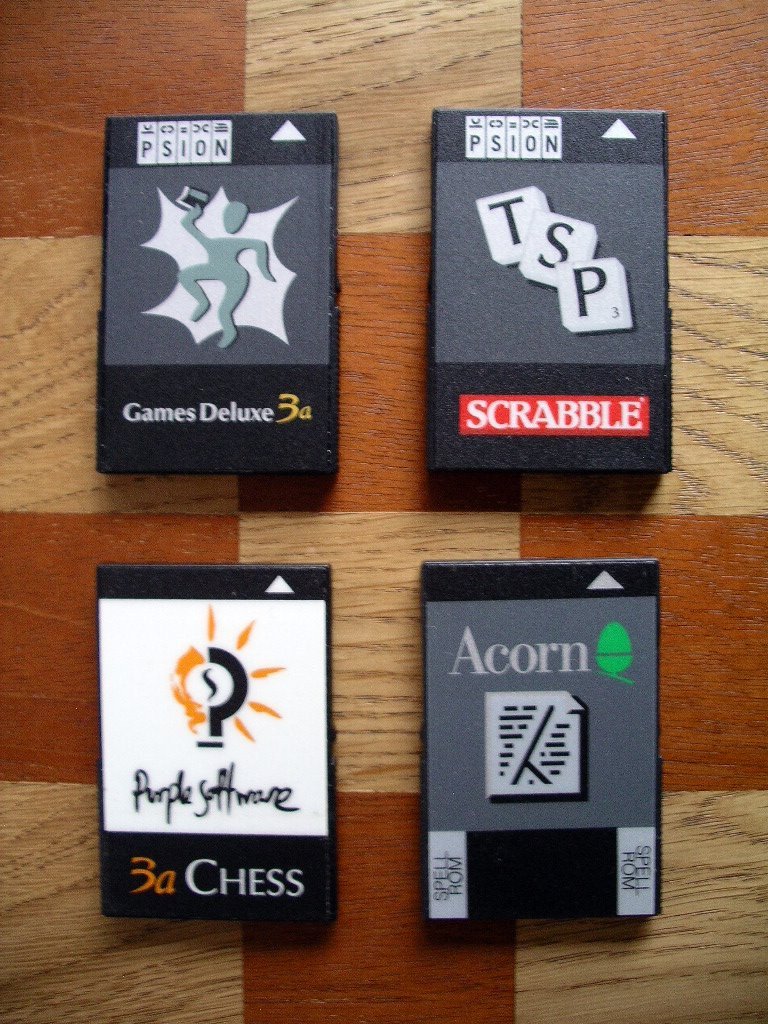
Software for Psion Series 3 PDAs

Software packs were optional extras. Software was available from Psion PLC or from third parties, such as Purple Software, PsionPages or Widget UK. In later years software became available via download. The software memory unit slots into either of two bays: there is one bay hidden by a swivel locking door at each end of the Series 3 models. A Mob-i-Mail software package was used to enable sending email via Short Message Service (SMS) and Mobitex networks.

The spell software pack is for the early models that did not have a spell checking facility preloaded.

=== Memory modules ===
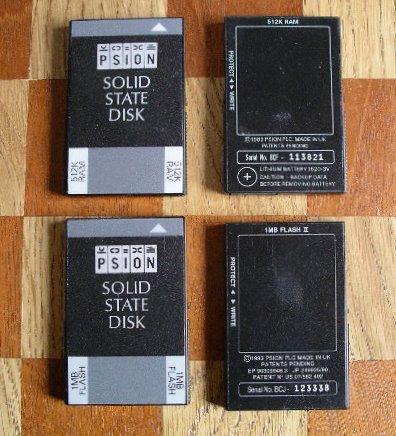
RAM & Flash: both sides shown

The older RAM needed a button cell to keep the data stable in the memory. One button cell fitted into each module.

The later memory modules, flash I and flash II, did not need a battery and were cheaper for each capacity (both versions continued being manufactured).

The flash modules did have the limit of needing to be re-formatted entirely to reclaim space from deleted or modified files; old versions of files which were deleted or modified continued to take up space until the module was formatted. This made the RAM modules more desirable for use where the data stored was likely to be changed frequently, as every change with a flash module meant writing a new version of the file into the remaining space.

=== Psion Travel Modem ===
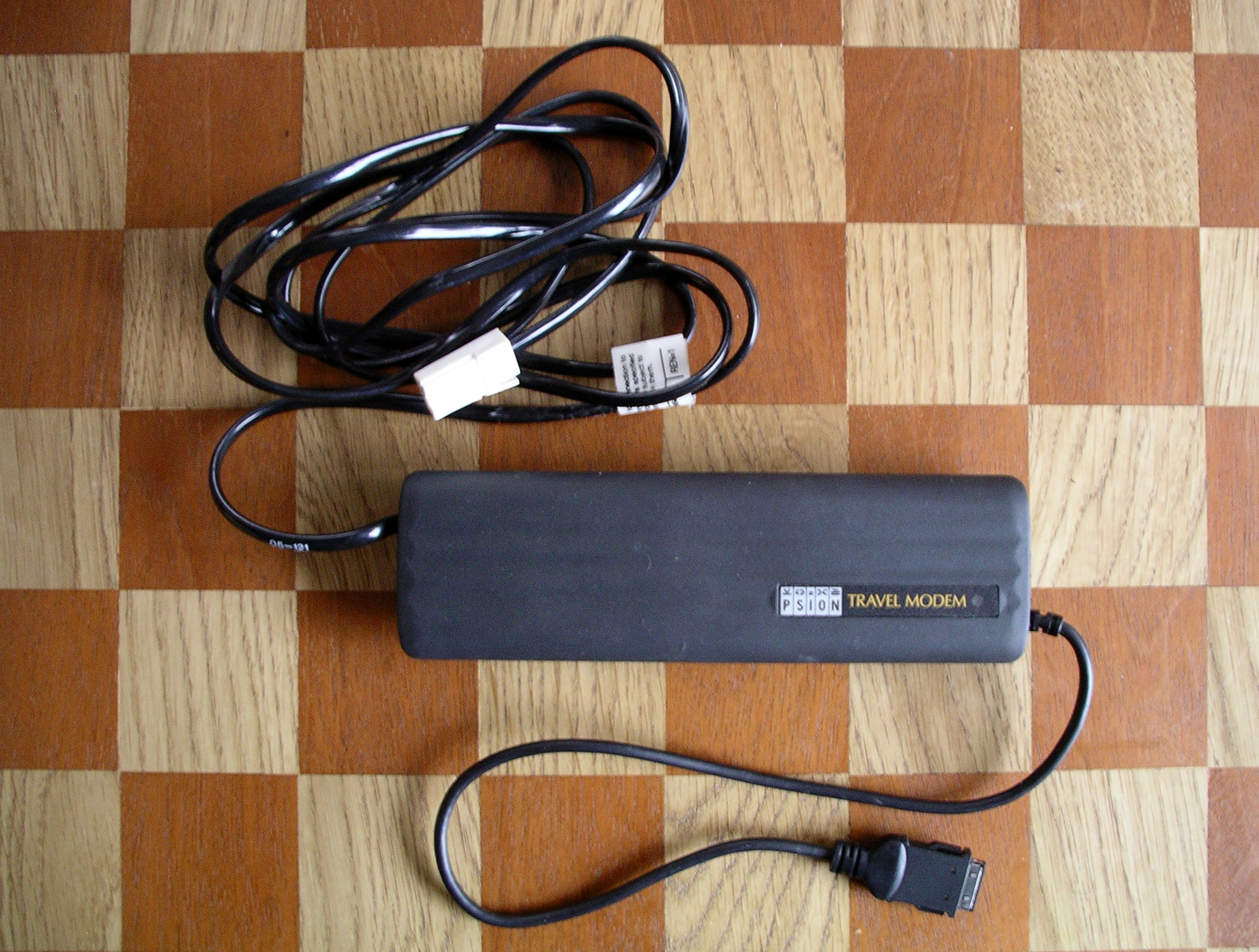
Psion Travel Modem

The Psion Travel Modem is an optional extra. They were made at the Psion Dacom plc factory in Milton Keynes, England. The connections to the Psion Series 3 and 3a are different from those for the Series 3c and 3mx.

== Reception ==
InfoWorld's Raphael Needleman acclaimed "I've been using the Psion for about a week, and I'm getting pretty attached to it. All it really needs is a bigger keyboard—maybe one of the inflatable keyboards I've heard people joke about." PCMag's Jonathan Matzkin said "With an improved keyboard and a more adjustable screen, the Series 3 would clearly be the new leader in the palmtop field."

== See also ==
- Psion (company)
- Psion Organiser
- Psion Series 5
- Psion Series 7
