= Daniel W. Dobberpuhl =

American electrical engineer (1945–2019)

Daniel William Dobberpuhl
- Born: March 25, 1945; Streator, Illinois, U.S.
- Died: October 26, 2019 (aged 74); Pacific Grove, California, U.S.
- Education: University of Illinois at Urbana–Champaign: Bachelor of Science in electrical engineering
- Engineering career
- Discipline: Microprocessor design
- Projects: MicroVAX, Alpha, StrongARM, PWRficient
- Significant design: DEC Alpha
- Awards: IEEE Donald O. Pederson Award in Solid-State Circuits (2003)

Daniel William Dobberpuhl (March 25, 1945 – October 26, 2019) was an electrical engineer in the United States who led several teams of microprocessor designers.

== Background ==
Dobberpuhl was born in Streator, Illinois on March 25, 1945. He graduated with a Bachelor of Science degree in electrical engineering from the University of Illinois at Urbana–Champaign in 1967. He worked as an engineer for the Department of Defense until 1973 when he worked for GE Integrated Circuits Laboratory in Syracuse, New York, making application-specific integrated circuits.

=== DEC ===
In 1976 Dobberpuhl joined Digital Equipment Corporation (DEC) in Hudson, Massachusetts as a semiconductor engineer and led teams designing microprocessors such as the DEC T-11 and MicroVAX. He rose to become one of five senior corporate consulting engineers, DEC's highest technical positions. As such, he led the teams designing the first three generations of the DEC Alpha processor and in 1985 published a textbook called "The Design and Analysis of VLSI Circuits", described as "a leading text in the field."

He founded and directed the company's Palo Alto, California Design Center in 1993 where the StrongARM architecture was designed.

=== SiByte ===
Following the transfer of StrongARM to Intel, in 1998 Dobberpuhl co-founded SiByte, where as president he led the design of the SB1250 64-bit MIPS system on a chip processor, intended for high-performance networking applications. In 1998 EE Times named Dobberpuhl as one of the "40 forces to shape the future of the Semiconductor Industry". SiByte was funded by venture capital, as well as large companies such as ATI Technologies, Cisco Systems, and Juniper Networks, closing a third round of $40 million in funding in May 2000. Shortly after the company announced their SB1250 processor in August, the company was bought by Broadcom in November of that year for stock worth over $2 billion. Dobberpuhl stayed until 2003 as vice-president and general manager of the Broadcom broadband processor division.

In 2003 the Institute of Electrical and Electronics Engineers named him a recipient of the IEEE Donald O. Pederson Award in Solid-State Circuits for "Pioneering design of high-speed and low-power microprocessors."

=== P.A. Semi ===
Later in 2003 he left to found P.A. Semi, a fabless semiconductor company that designed the PWRficient family of Power ISA processors. He was elected to the National Academy of Engineering in 2006 for "Innovative design and implementation of high-performance, low-power microprocessors." In 2008 P.A. Semi was sold to Apple Inc. for a reported $278M USD.

He received a Distinguished Alumni Award by University of Illinois in 2003, and the College Of Engineering Alumni Honor Award from the University of Illinois in May 2009.

=== Agnilux ===
Dobberpuhl retired from Apple near the end of 2009, leaving to join the startup Agnilux, who were acquired by Google shortly afterwards in April 2010.

He held 15 patents.

Dobberpuhl was Chairman of the Board for embedded machine vision company Movidius.

He died at Pacific Grove, California on October 26, 2019.

== Works ==
- Lance A. Glasser; Daniel W. Dobberpuhl (1985). The design and analysis of VLSI circuits. Addison Wesley. ISBN 978-0-201-12580-1.
- D.W. Dobberpuhl; et al. (November 1992). "A 200-MHz 64-b dual-issue CMOS microprocessor". IEEE Journal of Solid-State Circuits. 27 (11): 1555–1567. Bibcode:1992IJSSC..27.1555D. doi:10.1109/4.165336. S2CID 18106281.
- D.W. Dobberpuhl (September 15, 1997). "Circuits and technology for Digital's StrongARM and ALPHA microprocessors [CMOS technology]". Proceedings Seventeenth Conference on Advanced Research in VLSI. pp. 2–11. doi:10.1109/ARVLSI.1997.634842. ISBN 978-0-8186-7913-1. S2CID 37135123.
- Committee on Sustaining Growth in Computing Performance (March 21, 2011). The Future of Computing Performance: Game Over or Next Level?. National Academies Press. ISBN 978-0-309-15951-7.
