= Psion Organiser =

Palmtop pocket computer from Psion

The Psion Organiser is a range of pocket computers developed by the British company Psion in the 1980s. Both the Organiser I (launched in 1984) and Organiser II (launched in 1986) feature a characteristic hard plastic sliding cover protecting a 6×6 keypad instead of a computer keyboard, with letters arranged alphabetically.

The Organiser II competed with the Filofax and can be considered the first usable electronic organizer or personal digital assistant (PDA) in that it combined an electronic diary and searchable address database in a small, portable device.

Production of consumer hand-held devices by Psion has now ceased; the company, after corporate changes, now concentrates on hardware and software for industrial and commercial data-collection applications.

On an episode of The Gadget Show, first aired 30 March 2009, the Psion was pitted against the BlackBerry for a place on the show's Hall of Fame. Whilst the Psion was highly praised as a device that pioneered portable computing, host Jon Bentley ultimately gave the accolade to the BlackBerry.

As of autumn 2024 several software features and hardware devices are still being developed and are available including a JavaScript Emulator, Parallel Interface, USB Commslink, 32 kilobyte (KB) and 256 KB RAMpaks, and 512 KB FlashPak.

== Organiser I ==
Psion Organiser I
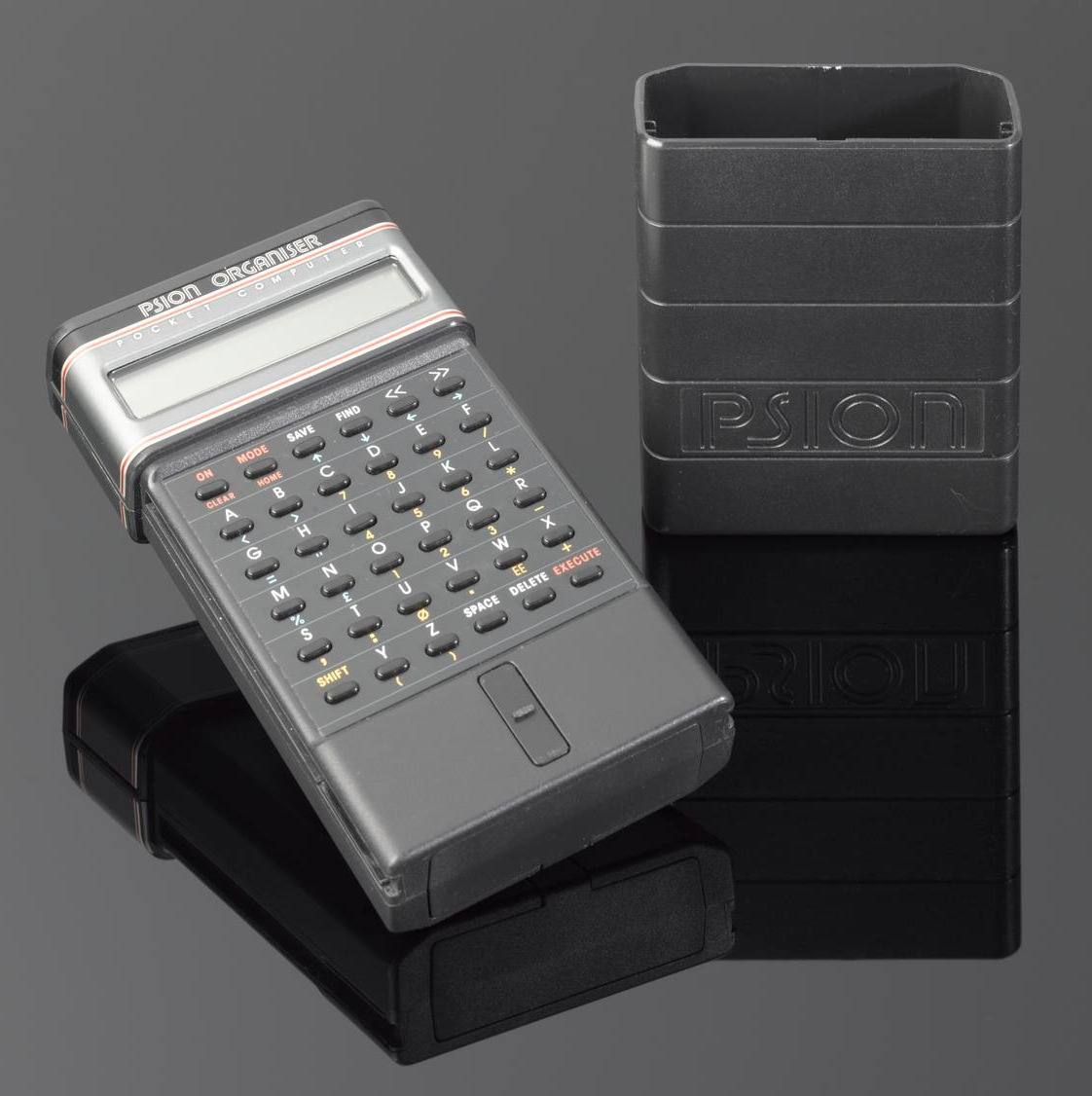
- Psion Organiser I
- Developer: Psion PLC
- Manufacturer: Psion PLC
- Product family: Psion Organiser
- Type: Pocket computer
- Generation: 1
- Released: 1984; 42 years ago
- Introductory price: £99 GBP, C$199
- Discontinued: 1986; 40 years ago
- Operating system: no
- CPU: 8-bit Hitachi 6301
- Memory: 2 KB
- Removable storage: 2 Datapaks
- Display: Liquid crystal 1 line
- Input: Keypad 6×6
- Dimensions: 142 × 78 × 29.3 mm
- Weight: 225 grams
- Successor: Psion Organiser II
- Language: English

Launched in 1984, the Psion Organiser was the "world's first practical pocket computer". Based on an 8-bit Hitachi 6301-family processor, running at 0.9 MHz, with 4 KB of read-only memory (ROM) and 2 KB of static RAM and has a one-row monochrome liquid crystal display (LCD) screen. The size with the case closed is 142 × 78 × 29.3 mm, and the mass is 225 grams.

A Byte reviewer described the Organiser's software as a "clever design ... for fast and foolproof use". He approved of the consistent user interface across applications and reported that without documentation he was able to learn how to do everything except program in 15 minutes. The machine provided a simple flat-file database, calculator and clock, and had no operating system (OS). The Organiser I supported removable storage write once read many (write-once) devices, which used erasable programmable read-only memory EPROM storage. The device can host two of these, named Datapaks (stylized as DATAPAK, or simply PAK), to which it can write data, but which must be removed from the device and erased by exposure to ultraviolet light before they can be re-used. As Psion had patented the use of EPROMS as a storage device, it was impossible for other device makers to copy this unusual approach to mobile storage.

Software supplied on Datapak included a crude programming language named POPL, in which end-users could write their own programs. Software Datapaks titled Science, Maths and Finance contained the POPL programming language editor, interpreter and runtime system and extended the built-in calculator by adding named functions. These Datapaks also contained different sets of application software written in the POPL language.

A far more sophisticated programming tool was later made available with the implementation of the Forth language, but was available to registered professional developers rather than end users. The Psion Forth Development System for the Organiser I was a powerful set of IBM PC-based cross-development tools for producing Forth application software, including a Forth compiler. The Forth system on the Organiser I had a compiler to intermediate code, interpreter and runtime, and had several unusual design features one being that it could interpret – that is, read and execute – Forth intermediate code directly in place on a Datapak, rather than needing to copy it into precious RAM first, despite the Datapaks not being execute-in-place memory-mapped.

Software developed by Psion as part of the Organiser I project, and application software after its launch, was written in 6301 assembly language, in POPL, and in other custom-designed languages. Assembly language development at Psion was carried out using cross-development tools, including a cross assembler and linker, all of which ran on a Digital Equipment Corporation (DEC) VAX.

Application developers writing in 6301 assembly struggled with the small amount of RAM (2 KB) and the lack of an operating system. Another difficulty for developers was with the performance limits of the earliest Datapaks, which used a serial-access internal architecture, instead of random access. Retrieving, for example, byte 2000 from a Datapak meant issuing successive hardware commands to either step from the current read position one address place at time until position 2000 was reached or, in the worst case, resetting the read position to zero and then issuing a step-forward command 2000 times.

The Hitachi 6301 processor is an enhanced development based on the Motorola 6801 implemented in complementary metal–oxide–semiconductor (CMOS), with several extra instructions, various hardware system on a chip (SoC) facilities on-chip, power management and support for a sleep state. The particular variant chosen also had 4 KB of masked ROM on-chip, so an external ROM was unneeded on the board.

Having fully static RAM and a processor which clock could be frozen without losing state meant very long battery life, measured in weeks or even months. Minimal power use was aided by the processor being frozen whenever there was no work to do, plus a deeper sleep mode, which turned off the display.

The machine lacked a full independently battery-backed, date-time real-time hardware clock, instead it had a simple hardware counter. While the machine was sleeping, the counter counted 1,024 seconds and then woke the machine very briefly, so that software could add 1,024 seconds to a record of the time held in RAM. This meant that when sleeping the machine woke very fleetingly every 17 minutes 4 seconds.

The original 1984 price was £99 GBP or $199 CAD and included one Datapak and one software Datapak, the Utility pack. This latter adds scientific and trigonometric functions to the otherwise basic calculator routines.

== Organiser II ==
Psion Organiser II
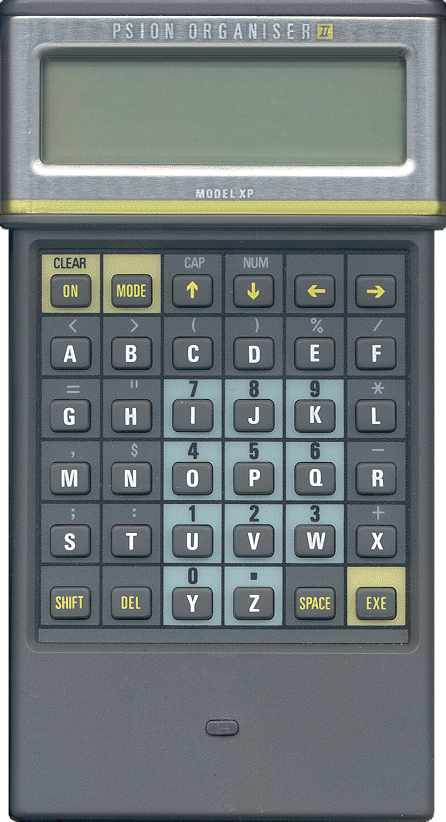
- Psion Organiser II
- Developer: Psion PLC
- Manufacturer: Psion PLC
- Product family: Psion Organiser
- Type: Pocket computer
- Generation: 2
- Released: 1986; 40 years ago
- Discontinued: 1996; 30 years ago
- Units sold: 500,000+
- Operating system: Single-tasking
- Memory: 8, 16, 32, or 64 KB
- Storage: 8–128 KB
- Display: Liquid crystal 2 line
- Input: Keypad 6×6
- Connectivity: RS-232 port CommsLink
- Predecessor: Psion Organiser I
- Successor: Psion Series 3
- Language: English

Psion Organisers

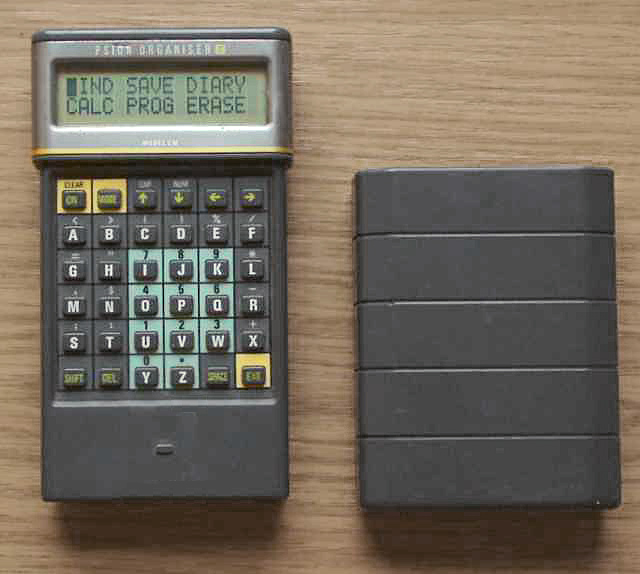
Organiser II with cover

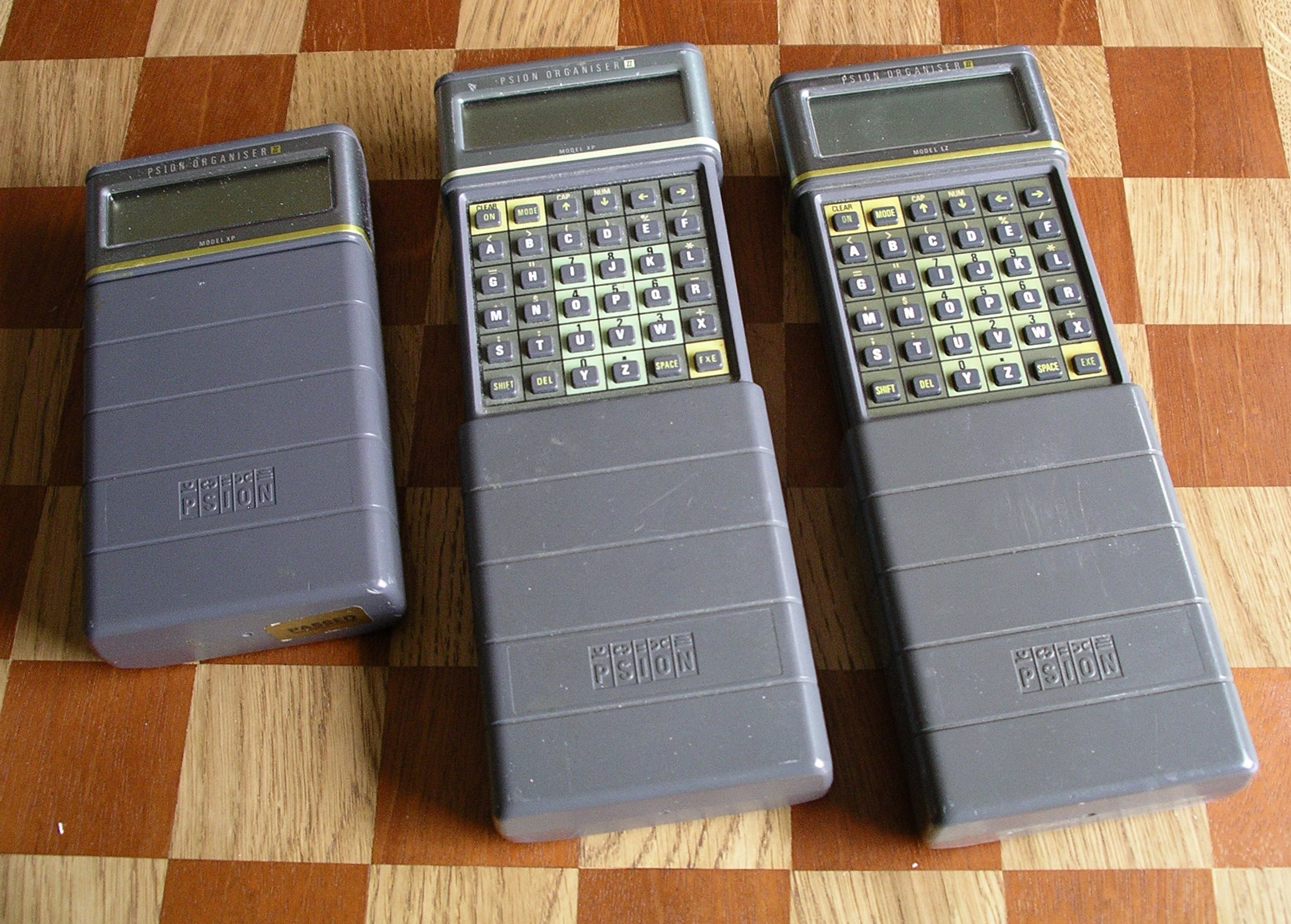
Organiser II (open and closed); models XP & LZ shown on 5 cm squares

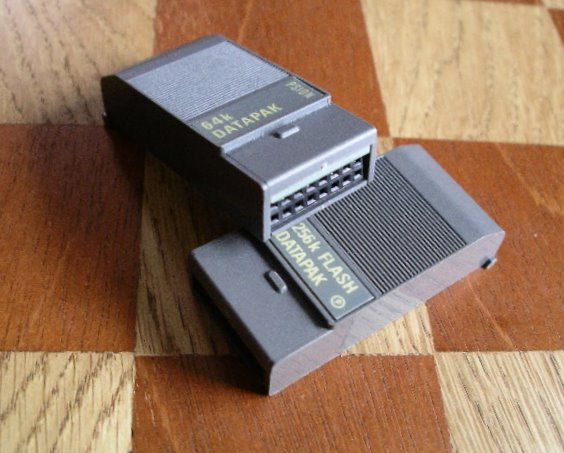
Memory modules for the Organiser (on 5 cm squares)

In 1986, the successful Organiser II introduced many hardware improvements, a better keyboard and display, a much larger ROM and either 8 KB (CM Model), 16 or 32 KB (XP Model), 32 or 64 KB (later LZ Model) of battery-backed RAM, and featured a capable newly designed single-tasking operating system. The first Organiser II models featured a two-line display. The new model supported several different types of improved Datapaks, containing either EPROM or battery-backed RAM storage, each storing between 8 KB and 128 KB of data. Later electrically erasable programmable read-only memory (EEPROM) flashpaks, and random-access memory (RAM) RAMpaks, were added to the range, able to store up to 256 KB on each extension slot.

The machine had far more application functionality, including many built-in application programs, an easy-to-use database, a diary, and an alarm clock, and featured end-user programmability in the form of the successful then-named Organiser Programming Language (OPL), a BASIC-like language, which was compiled to intermediate code, in contrast to the interpreters, which were commonly available for other consumer computers of the time. More advanced users could edit the system machine-code routines, either by direct machine code or by calls from OPL, could manipulate the built-in address database, and create their own.

The Organiser II was widely used for commercial applications in companies such as Marks & Spencer, where it was used on the shop floor, with their branding instead of Psion's and with only limited keys visible to the end user. It was also used in the world's first large-scale application of mobile technology in government, where over 3,000 were used for benefit calculations by the Employment Services department of the UK government. It proved popular with surveyors who interfaced it with electronic theodolites, which proved to be the precursor to the now popular total station.

The Organiser II also had an external device slot, into which various plug-in modules could be fitted, including a device that provided an RS-232 port (named CommsLink), thus enabling it to communicate with other devices or computers. This top slot also supported various other hardware additions, such as telephone dialers, a speech synthesiser, barcode reader, and a dedicated thermal printer. This latter was used by several banks as a counter-top exchange-rate calculator for some years. As it was easy to get hardware specifications, many bespoke devices were developed by small companies such as analog-to-digital converters (A/D) and even an interface to the full range of Mitutoyo measuring equipment, allowing it to be used in quality control for various car manufacturers. Later models in the Organiser II range offered other hardware improvements, with 4-line displays, and also models were introduced with 32, 64 and 96 KB RAM.

=== Post production enthusiasts and developments ===
In the autumn of 1996, when Psion PLC had moved their focus away from the Organiser II onto the newer clamshell series devices (below) and had almost ceased support for the Organiser II, Dave Woolnough created the Psion Organiser II Homepage, the original Org2.com, to fill the gap, stating "Considering that more than 500,000 series II Organisers were produced, there must be many people still using this wonderful machine". In the summer of 1997, Jaap Scherphuis joined the site as software specialist and soon became fully responsible for maintaining the web pages on a day-to-day basis. Dave wrote about Scherphuis "A Remarkable Psion Programmer". The Psion 2 archive had a large proportion of programmes written by Scherphuis, many written in machine code. In the spring of 2002 Boris Cornet took over as site maintainer/editor. Later that year he replaced the chat (bulletin board) with the now defunct Psion Organiser II Forum. When he died in 2012, the administrative duties for the forum were taken over by a power user MIKESAN who ran it until the spring of 2020 when he developed a terminal illness and the site became inaccessible. In January 2021 Olivier Gossuin, a Belgian enthusiast, launched a new Organiser II User Forum which in turn became inaccessible in 2022. In January 2023 a Canadian enthusiast Yves Martin provided space on his business server for a replacement forum with a long time enthusiast Martin Reid helping with the administration.

Another legacy that Boris Cornet left Organiser II users is Psi2Win, the Windows PC comms link server. This Windows-friendly server was developed using Jaaps' reverse engineered comms link protocol. Boris always considered his Comms Server Psi2Win to be in permanent state of 'beta testing' but with his sad passing it is no longer being developed. With this in mind the author of ORG-link has further developed and released ORG-Link_V2 an Organiser II Comms Link Server that works in all Windows versions 32 and 64 bit. In the winter of 2013, Jaap created his web site with the aim "to be an archive of Psion Organiser II information and software that might otherwise be abandoned and lost". Hardware developments have continued with Organiser II Forum enthusiasts creating periferals such as microUSB CommsLink, 256 KB RAMPak, 512 KB FlashPak, and USB Power Supply.

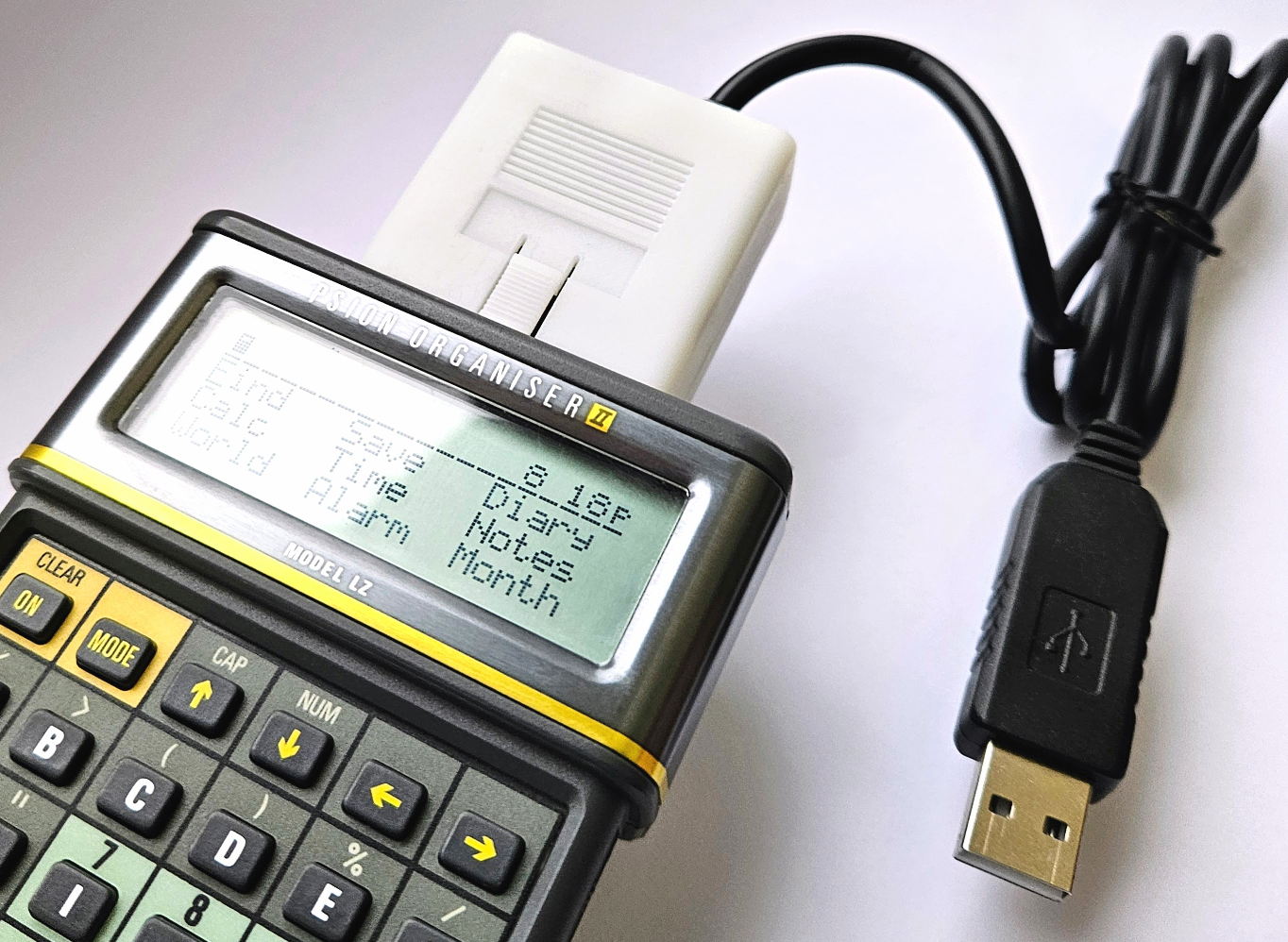
An example USB Comm Link created by forum members 40 years after the initial launch of the Organiser II

These, with other Organiser II hardware and software, are still available from the West Yorkshire Psion Store. Massimo Cellin created the Psion Facebook group in the autumn of 2015, servicing all the Psion products including the Organiser II. Members of the Facebook group include the former editor of IPSO FACTO, the 1980s and 1990s newsletters of the International Psion Pocket Computers User Group, copies of which are still available from Scherphuis' archive.

== Table of models ==
Psion Organiser I/II models
Model	Year	RAM (KB)	ROM (KB)	CPU	Clock (MHz)	Display	Datapak* (KB)	Use Calculator to find version
I	1984	2	4	6301	0.9	16×1	16	CALC:PEEKB(-24)
II CM	1986	8	32	6303	0.9	16×2	64	0 = CM 8K
II XP	1986	16	32	6303	0.9	16×2	2048	1 = XP 16K
II LA**	1986	32	32	6303	0.9	16×2	2048	2 = XP 32K
II LZ	1989	32	64	6303	0.9	20×4	2048	14 = LZ 32K
II LZ64	1989	64	64	6303	0.9	20×4	2048	13 = LZ64 64K

* Maximum size of Datapak supported. Although it looks like the operating system might be able to recognise 2048K the largest pack size currently available from the Psion eBay store is RAM Pack 256K or Flash Pack 512K
** LA model still carried the XP label on its casing

In addition to the above, many other industrial, one-off and special edition models were released, including a special edition with transparent housing. Some of these models have radically different keyboard layouts.

== Subsequent hand-held devices ==
The name "Organiser" was not used for later Psion handhelds, such as the SIxteen-Bit Organiser (SIBO) family Psion MC400 laptop, the Psion Series 3 and the 32-bit Psion Series 5 machines, which were of a clamshell design with a QWERTY keyboard. As to hardware architecture and operating system, these had no links to the earlier Organiser range, other than the end-user programming language, which shared a great deal of structure with OPL.

The SIBO family, and the improved version of the OPL language (with window and focus controls), was replaced in 1997 by a new ARM architecture-based operating system EPOC32 written in C++; the latter was later sold as the Symbian operating system, which until 2010 was the most widely used OS in smartphones, being in 2011 displaced by Google's Android OS. This change was more significant than appeared at the time. The consumer-grade high-level programming language still shares features with OPL, but the developer toolkits were from then on focused on programmers familiar with C and only the Symbian operating system remains.

The first similar device made in the USA did not appear until 1985 and was manufactured by Validec.

== See also ==
- Psion Series 7
