= EPOC (operating system) =

Mobile operating system

- Developer: Psion
- Written in: Assembly, C (EPOC16); C++ (EPOC32)
- OS family: EPOC
- Working state: Discontinued, succeeded by Symbian
- Source model: Closed source
- Initial release: 1989; 37 years ago
- Latest release: ER5u / 2000; 26 years ago
- Marketing target: PDAs, mobile phones
- Available in: English
- Supported platforms: x86 via NEC V30H (EPOC16); ARM (EPOC32)
- Kernel type: Microkernel
- Default user interface: Eikon et al.
- License: Proprietary
- Succeeded by: Symbian

Support status
- Historical, unsupported

EPOC is a mobile operating system developed by Psion, a British company founded in 1980. It began as a 16-bit operating system (OS) for Psion's own x86-compatible devices, and was later replaced by a 32-bit system for x86 and ARM. Psion licensed the 32-bit system to other hardware makers, such as Ericsson.

To distinguish it from the 16-bit OS, the 32-bit version was sometimes called EPOC32. Technologically, it was a major departure from the 16-bit version (which came to be called EPOC16 or SIBO). In 1998, the 32-bit version was renamed Symbian OS. After Nokia acquired the rights to Symbian in 2010, they published Symbian's source code under the Eclipse Public License. In 2011, Nokia rescinded the open-source license for subsequent releases of the software.

== Name ==
The name EPOC comes from the word epoch (the beginning of an era). The name was shortened to four letters to accord with the names of such software innovations as Unix and Mach.

Initially the operating system was capitalised as Epoc rather than 'EPOC', since it is not an acronym. The change to all capital letters was made on the recommendation of Psion's marketing department. Thereafter, a rumour circulated in the technical press that EPOC was an acronym for "Electronic Piece of Cheese". When Psion started developing a 32-bit operating system in 1994, they kept it under the EPOC brand. To avoid confusion within the company, they started calling the old system EPOC16, and the new one EPOC32. Then it became conventional within the company to refer to EPOC16 as SIBO, which was the codename of Psion's 16-bit mobile computing initiative. This change freed them use the name EPOC for EPOC32.

In June 1998, Psion formed a limited company, named Symbian Ltd., with the telecommunications corporations Nokia, Ericsson, and Motorola. By buying into the new firm, the telecommunications corporations each acquired a stake in Psion's EPOC operating system and other intellectual property. Symbian Ltd. changed the name of EPOC/EPOC32 to Symbian OS, which debuted in November 2000 on the Nokia 9210 Communicator smartphone.

== EPOC16 (1989–1998) ==
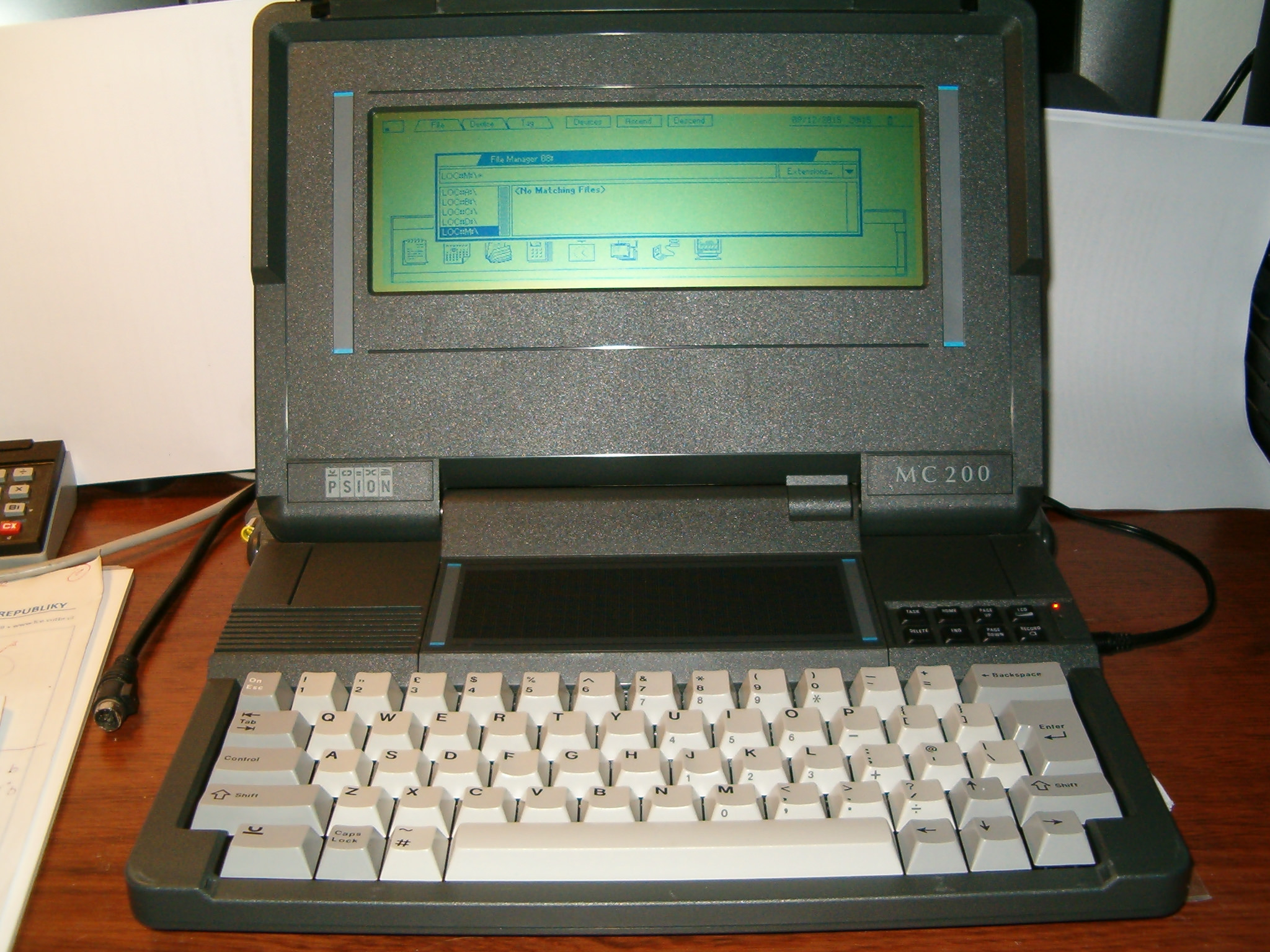
Psion MC200 (1989) running EPOC16

EPOC was developed at Psion, a software and mobile-device company founded in London in 1980. The company released its first pocket computer in 1984: an 8-bit device named the Psion Organiser. In 1986 they released a series of improved models under the Organiser II brand, but the 8-bit era was ending. Psion saw a need to develop a 16-bit operating system to drive their next generation of devices. First, however, they needed to engineer a 16-bit single-board computer, something that was extremely difficult at the time. They codenamed the project SIBO, for "single-board organiser" or "sixteen-bit organiser". To develop the SIBO hardware and software, they needed samples of the 16-bit microprocessors they would be programming; but it took more than a year to secure the chips, which caused a significant delay.

By 1987, development of EPOC was underway: It was a single-user, preemptive multitasking operating system designed to run in read-only memory (ROM). The operating system and its programmes were written in Intel 8086 assembly language and C. When the operating system started, it opened the pre-installed programmes in advance so that the system could switch between them quickly. To enable users to write and run their own programmes, EPOC featured an updated version of the Open Programming Language (OPL), which was first published with the Psion Organiser. OPL was a simple interpreted language somewhat like BASIC.

In 1989, Psion released the first 16-bit computers to be equipped with the new operating system: the MC200 and MC400 notebooks. Each of these had an Intel 80C86 processor, but differed in some other specifications, such as memory capacity. Among the later SIBO devices were the Psion Series 3 (1991), 3A (1993), 3C (1996), Workabout series, and the Siena 512K model (1996). The final EPOC device was the Psion Series 3mx (1998).

The user interface differed by device. The notebook computers had a windows, icons, menus, pointer (WIMP) graphical user interface (GUI). The handheld computers, which had smaller screens and no pointing device, accept input from a keyboard or a stylus. On-screen, programmes were represented by icons, but on smaller devices a user could also access them via specialised buttons.

== EPOC32 (1997–2000) ==
In parallel with the production of their 16-bit devices, Psion had been developing a 32-bit version of EPOC since late 1994. The move to 32 bits was necessary to remain competitive, and Psion wanted to have a mobile operating system they could license to other companies. Thus, the system needed to be more portable than their prior systems.

For the 32-bit operating system, the engineers wrote a new object-oriented codebase in C++. During the transition period, the old system came to be called EPOC16, and new one EPOC32. Where EPOC16 was designed specifically for the Intel 80186 platform, EPOC32 was built for ARM, a computing platform called a reduced instruction set computer (RISC), whose instruction set is smaller than in the alternative style, complex instruction set computer (CISC). Like EPOC16, EPOC32 was a single-user, pre-emptive multitasking operating system. It also featured memory protection, which was an essential feature for modern operating systems.

Psion licensed EPOC32 to other device manufacturers, and made it possible for manufacturers to change or replace the system's GUI. Because of the licensing arrangement, Psion considered spinning-off their software division as Psion Software. Psion's own PDAs had a GUI named Eikon. Visually, Eikon was a refinement of design choices from Psion's 8- and 16-bit devices.

=== Releases 1–4 ===
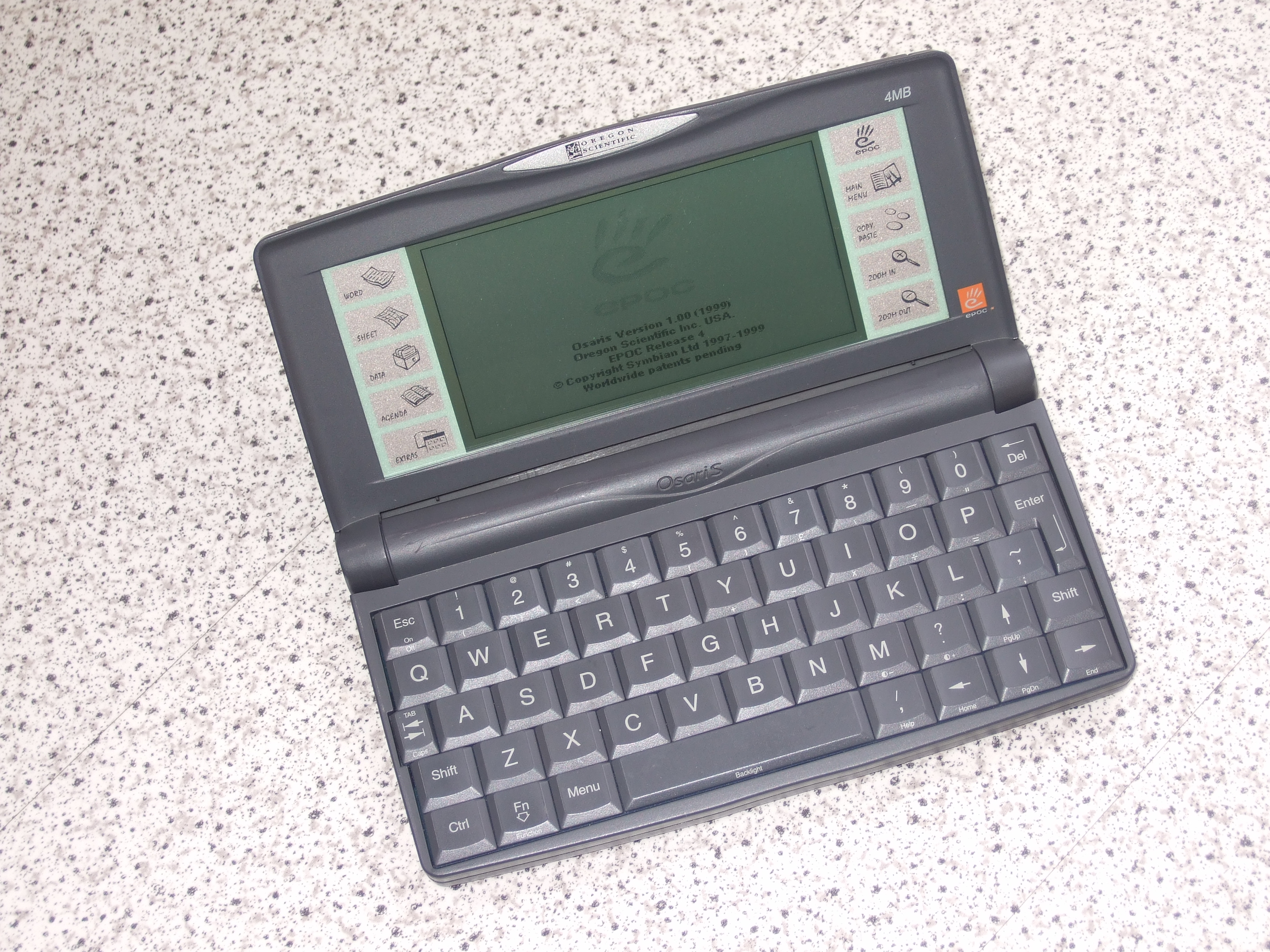
The Osaris PDA by Oregon Scientific ran version ER4 of the EPOC32 operating system.

Early iterations of the EPOC32 were codenamed Protea. The first published version, called Release 1, appeared on the Psion Series 5 ROM v1.0 in June 1997. Release 2 was never published, but an updated ROM (version 1.1) for the Series 5 featured Release 3. The Series 5 used Psion's new user interface, Eikon.

One of the first EPOC licensees was a short-lived company named Geofox; they halted production after selling fewer than 1,000 units. Another licensee, Oregon Scientific, released a budget device named Osaris; it was the only EPOC device to ship with Release 4.

=== Release 5 ===
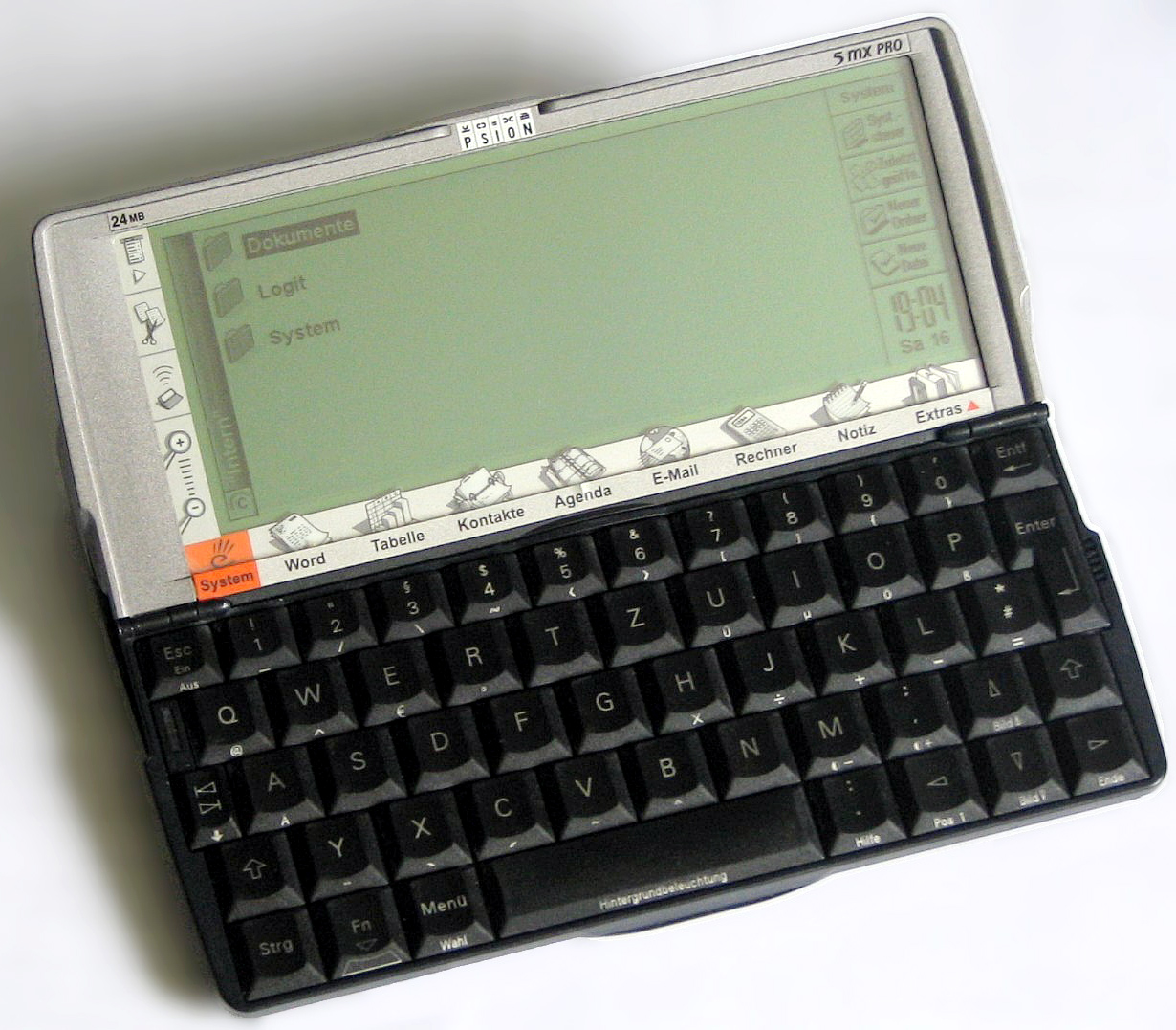
Psion Series 5mx (1999) running ER5

EPOC Release 5 premiered in March 1999. It ran on ARMv4 processors, such as the StrongARM series. In addition to its email, messaging, and data synchronisation features, it introduced support for the Java Development Kit, which made it capable of running a wider variety of programmes.

In 2000, EPOC's GUI variations were replaced with three reference interfaces: Crystal was for devices with a small keyboard; Quartz was for "communicator" devices (which had some telecommunication features, and tended to be equipped with a thumb keyboard); and Pearl was for mobile phones. Each classification supported VGA graphics.

Psion deployed Release 5 on their 5mx series (1999), Revo (1999), netBook (1999), Series 7 (1999), Revo Plus (2000), and netPad (2001) devices. Ericsson rebranded the Psion Series 5mx as the MC218, and SONICblue rebranded the Revo as the Diamond Mako; like the original devices, the rebranded versions were released in 1999.

The Ericsson R380 smartphone, released in November 2000, was the first device to be distributed with EPOC Release 5.1. This release was also known as ER5u; the u indicated that the system supported the Unicode system of text encoding: an important feature for the representation of diverse languages. Psion developed an ER5u-enabled device codenamed "Conan", but it did not advance beyond the prototype stage. The device was intended to be a Bluetooth-enabled successor to the Revo.

== Symbian (2000–2012) ==
In June 1998, Psion Software became Symbian Ltd., a major joint venture between Psion and phone manufacturers Ericsson, Motorola, and Nokia. The next release of EPOC32, Release 6, was rebranded Symbian OS. It decoupled the user interface from the underlying operating system, which afforded device manufacturers the ability (or burden) of implementing a graphical interface on their devices.

The final version of Symbian OS to be released was v10.1; the final update was published in 2012.
