= Psion Revo =

1999 personal digital assistant by Psion

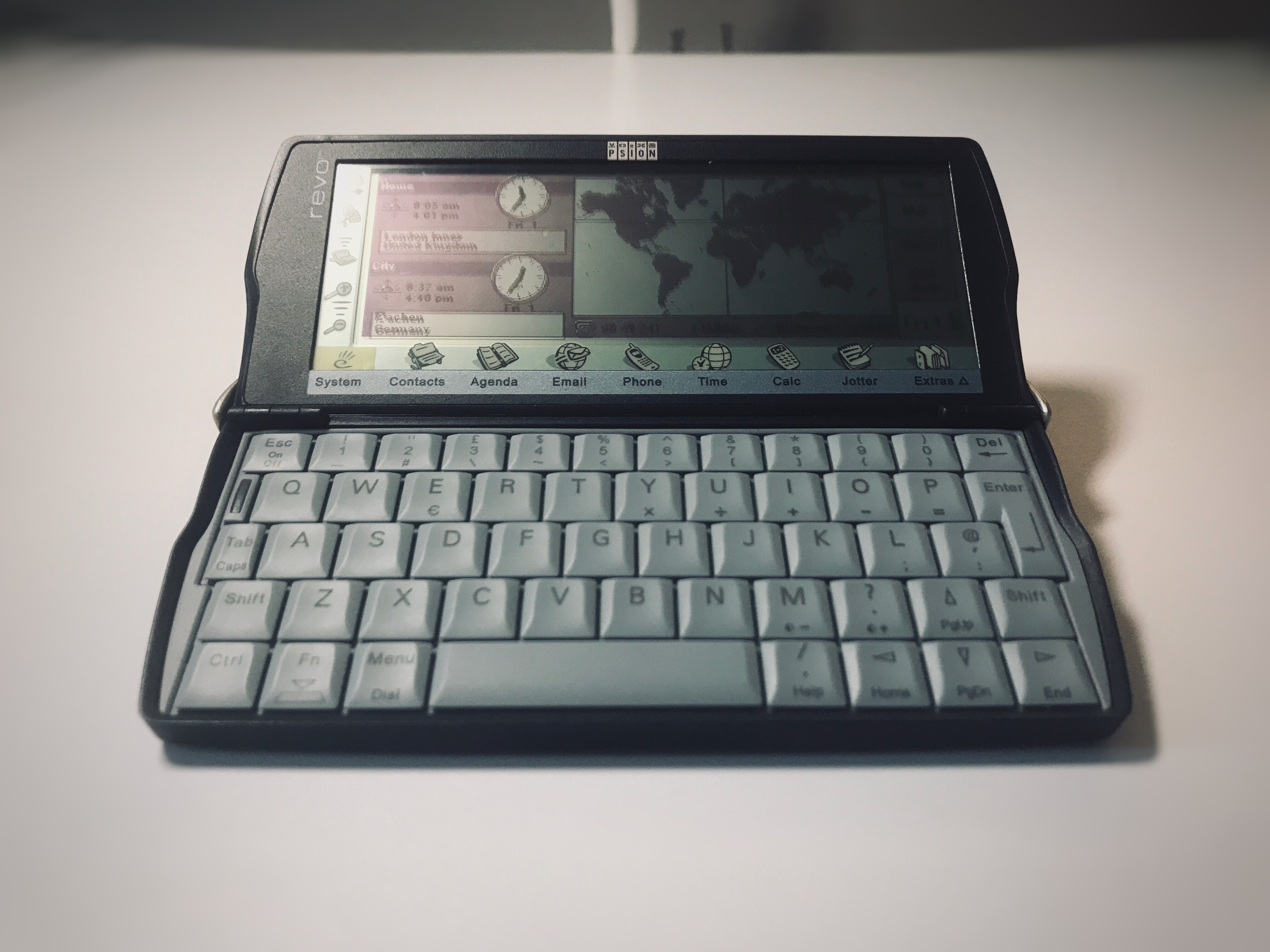
- A Psion Revo with the Time application open
- Developer: Psion Teklogix
- Manufacturer: Psion Teklogix
- Type: PDA
- Generation: 4
- Released: November 1999; 26 years ago
- Lifespan: 1999–2003
- Operating system: Symbian Release 5 (formally EPOC32)
- CPU: ARM 710T
- Display: 480 × 160 monochrome LCD, 13.1 cm (5.2 in)
- Input: QWERTY keyboard Resistive touchscreen Infrared port
- Camera: N/A
- Touchpad: N/A
- Connectivity: Serial RS-232 & IrDA 115200 (11,52 KB/s) baud rate
- Power: 2 × internal 700mAh rechargeable Ni-MH AAA batteries
- Dimensions: 157 mm × 79 mm × 17 mm (6.18 in × 3.11 in × 0.67 in)
- Weight: 200 grams (7.1 oz)
- Predecessor: Psion Series 5MX
- Successor: Conan (prototype)
- Related: Diamond Mako
- Language: Open Programming Language

The Psion Revo, launched in November 1999, is a personal digital assistant (PDA) from Psion. It is the successor to the Psion Series 3 and a light version of Psion Series 5mx. It is software-compatible with the 5mx and has the same processor but is more lightweight (200 grams (7.1 oz) vs 354 grams (12.5 oz) of 5mx) and substantially smaller (157 by 79 by 17 millimetres (6.18 in × 3.11 in × 0.67 in)). Relative to the Series 5 and 5mx, the Revo has a smaller screen (480 × 160 vs 640 × 240 of Series 5–5mx), and lacks a flash-card slot and backlight.

The Revo comes in two variants, Psion Revo and Psion Revo Plus, having 8 and 16 MB of random-access memory (RAM) respectively. It is powered by a 36 MHz ARM architecture 710T microprocessor, and a larger battery for the Plus model. Among other things, the hardware is equipped with a short-range Infrared Data Association (IrDA) wireless infrared communication system and a touchscreen. Like its bigger counterpart Series 5mx, it comes with a small suite of office and communications programs built into the ROM chips. Other programs are user-installable by using a docking station to send Revo programs from a desktop computer.

SONICblue Incorporated produced a version of the Psion Revo Plus renamed to Diamond Mako, which they distributed in the United States and Canada.

Along with Enfour, Psion made two versions of the Revo for the Chinese market named the 618C (Traditional Chinese characters) and 618S (Simplified Chinese characters).

== OpenPsion ==
Open-source software projects were begun to port Linux to the Psion Revo and other Psion PDAs, including OpenPsion, formerly PsiLinux, and Revol, an optimized version of OpenPsion for the Revo.

== Conan ==
Shortly before the demise of Psion in the commercial PDA market, work was near completion on a successor to the Revo, a 3rd-generation PDA with the codename Conan. The Conan ran EPOC Release 6 and was to feature support for Bluetooth and a backlight, although the former did not function in the development builds.

== Battery ==
The Revo was notorious for battery and charging problems. Unlike the Series 5mx, which used 2 user-replaceable AA batteries, the Revo is powered by 2 built-in rechargeable AAA 700 mAh nickel–metal hydride battery (NiMH) batteries. After backing up all data, the batteries can be accessed by closing the unit, gently prying off the logo plate (using heat and a watchmaker's knife or a similar tool), moving the 2 small pins that are behind it, and carefully opening the clam shell (silver part) of the casing, removing a third pin from the left hinge and very carefully lifting the part away unclipping it and sliding it to the right and off of the right hinge's fixed pin. The batteries are wrapped in black tape, which can be removed starting from the left, taking care not to break the thermistor that it also encloses. The positive and negative wires can be desoldered from their tabs, minding the iron tip does not make contact with the cell (don't cut the wires). Replacement batteries must be taped in just as securely and put a dab of glue over the socket, as Revos suffer from batteries coming loose and unplugging (fixed in the Plus model). After replacing (and after a hard reset), the unit must be charged uninterrupted from 0-100%, which is 6 hours for stock battery capacity (preferably with the unit turned off), so that the hardware can recalibrate, as per instructions for a new unit. Due to the way the charging circuit works, it is not recommended you use anything other than Ni-MH cells. If you replace with higher capacity, you will need to work out how much longer the device needs charging for. Ignore the battery meter on first charge. The (red) charging light turns off around 84%.

It is not recommended to put either Revo models on charge when their battery is over 80% due to a sense in thermal change required around this level. Missing this thermal change can and does lead to overchargeing.
