= Psion Series 5 =

Personal digital assistant produced by Psion PLC

Psion Series 5mx
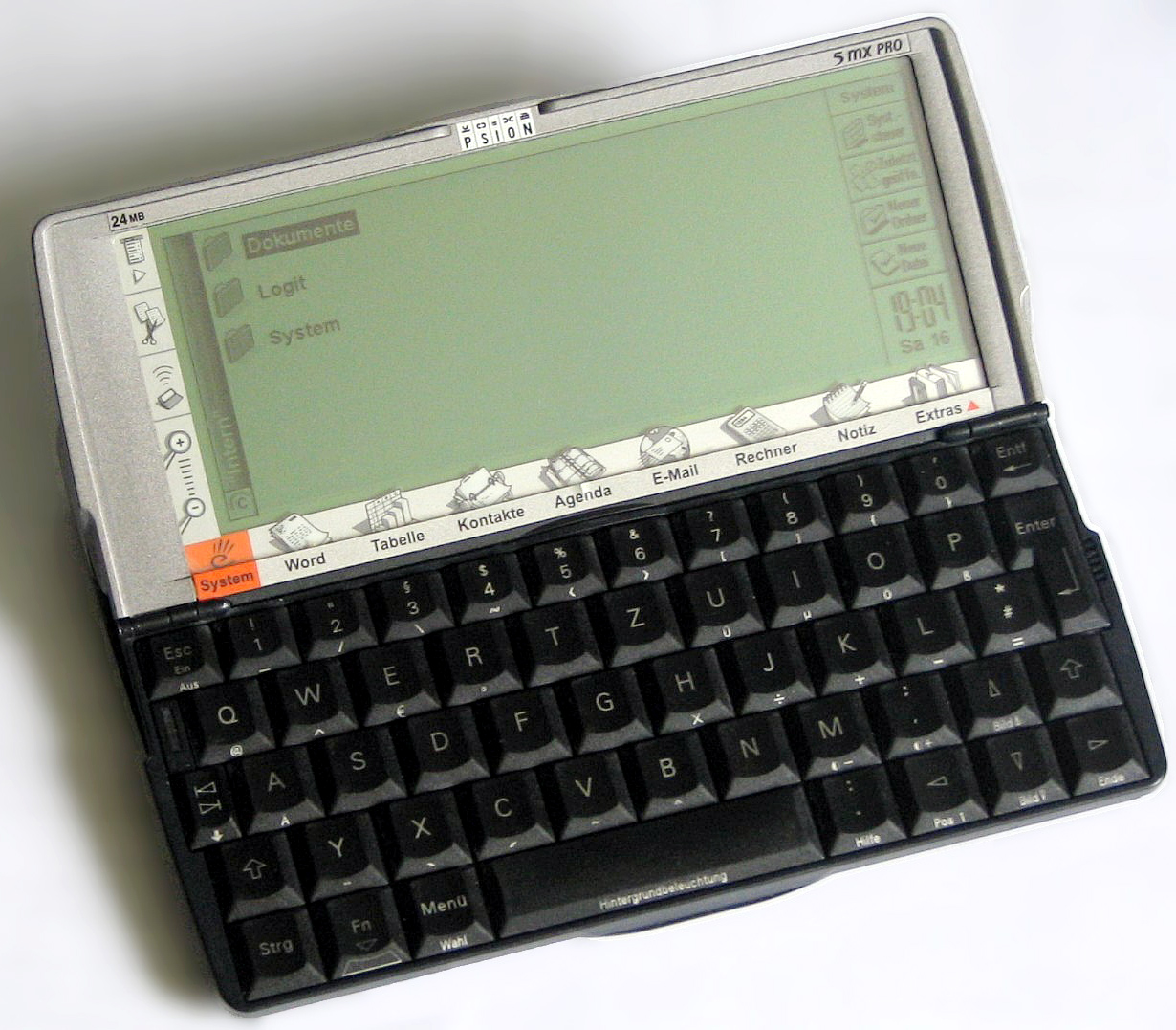
- Developer: Psion PLC
- Manufacturer: Psion PLC
- Type: Subnotebook PDA
- Released: 1997; 29 years ago
- Availability: 1997; 29 years ago
- Operating system: EPOC32
- CPU: CL-PS7110 @ 18–36 MHz
- Memory: 4–16 MB
- Display: 5.6", 640 × 240, 16 greyscale LCD
- Input: Keyboard, touchscreen, microphone
- Connectivity: RS-232, infra-red, CompactFlash
- Power: 2 AA batteries (10–20h use)
- Dimensions: 170 × 90 × 23 millimetres
- Weight: 354 grams (battery included)
- Predecessor: Psion Series 3
- Successor: Psion Series 7
- Related: Planet Computers Gemini

The Psion Series 5 is a personal digital assistant (PDA) from Psion. It was available in two main variants, the Series 5 (launched in 1997) and the Series 5mx (1999), the latter having a faster processor, clearer liquid crystal display (LCD), and updated software. There was also a rare Series 5mx Pro, which differed only in having the operating system (OS) loaded into random-access memory (RAM) and hence upgradeable. Ericsson marketed a version of the Series 5mx renamed as MC218.

The Psion Series 5 succeeded the Psion Series 3; there was never a Psion Series 4, due to concern about tetraphobia in Asian markets. The external appearance of the Psion Series 5 and the Psion Series 5mx are broadly similar, but their mainboards, screens and other internal components were different and not interchangeable.

The Series 5 was the first to feature a clamshell design, whereby the keyboard slides forward as the device opens to counterbalance the display, and brace it such that touchscreen actuation does not topple the device, a feature mentioned in the granted European patent EP 0766166B1. This novel design approach was the work of Martin Riddiford, an industrial designer for Therefore Design. A simplified version of this design was also used in the Psion Revo.

The Series 5 included a 32-bit ARM710-based CL-PS7110 central processing unit (CPU) running at 18 MHz (Series 5) or 36 MHz (5mx), with 4, 8, or 16 MB of RAM. It was powered by two AA batteries, typically giving 10–20 hours of use. The display is a touch-sensitive, backlit half-Video Graphics Array (VGA, 640 × 240 pixel) LCD with 16 greyscales. The keyboard has a key-pitch of 12.5 mm.Both RS-232 and infrared serial connections were included, as were a speaker and microphone. A CompactFlash slot allowed for external storage.

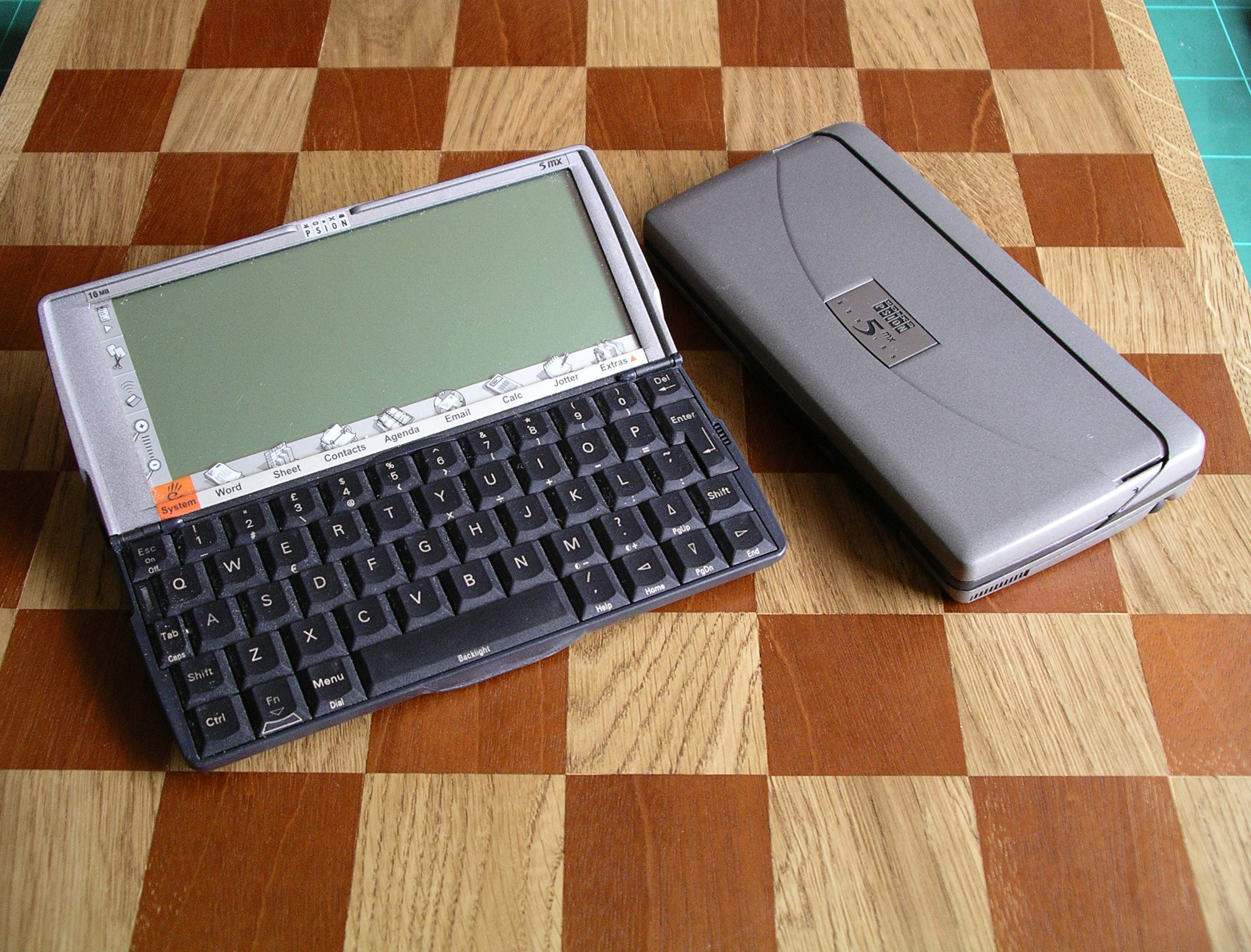
Psion 5mx — on 5 cm squares

The EPOC operating system, since renamed Symbian OS, was built in, along with application software including a word processor, spreadsheet, database, email, contact and diary manager, and Psion's Open programming language (OPL) for developing software. A Java virtual machine, the mobile browser STNC HitchHiker and synchronizing software for Microsoft Windows was bundled with the 5mx as optional installations and later, the Executive Edition of the 5mx was bundled with various hardware and software extras, including version 3.62 of the Opera web browser and a mains electric outlet adapter. A library of third-party software was also available, including games, utilities, navigation, reference, communication, and productivity applications, and standard programming tools like Perl and Python.

An open-source software project, OpenPsion, formerly PsiLinux, supports Linux on the Psion 5mx and other Psion PDAs.

In 2017, a team of original Psion engineers created a startup company, Planet Computers, to make an Android device in a similar form factor, the Gemini PDA. The Cosmo Communicator is a development of this device, enhancements including an external touchscreen on the rear of the clamshell lid, mainly to facilitate use as a mobile phone without opening. In 2022 they introduced an updated model called "Astro Slide 5G", but as of 2023, many customers had not received their ordered units.

== See also ==
- Psion (company)
- Psion Organiser
- Psion Series 3
- Psion Series 7
- Gemini (PDA)
