= UIQ Technology =

Swedish company

- Type: Aktiebolag
- Founded: 1999; 27 years ago
- Defunct: 5 January 2009; 17 years ago
- Fate: Bankruptcy
- Headquarters: Ronneby, Sweden
- Area served: Worldwide
- Key people: Johan Sandberg (CEO)
- Products: UIQ
- Number of employees: 270 (2008)
- Parent: Symbian Ltd. (1999-2006); Sony Ericsson (2006-2007); Sony Ericsson & Motorola (2007-2009)

UIQ Technology AB was a Swedish company that developed and licensed the UIQ software based on Symbian OS which was used in smartphone offerings from Sony Ericsson, Motorola, BenQ and Arima. They were based in the Soft Center Science & Research Park in Ronneby, Sweden, and at the time of its closure in 2009 was jointly owned by Motorola and Sony Ericsson.

== History ==
UIQ Technology was established in April 1999 as Symbian AB, a wholly owned subsidiary of Symbian Ltd., following their acquisition of Ericsson Mobile Applications Lab from Ericsson Mobile Communications. Using technology gained from the acquisition they created the UIQ platform which launched in 2002 and as the company changed its name to UIQ Technology.

In 2002 Sony Ericsson and Motorola (both members of Symbian Ltd.) came close to a joint venture, but this was abandoned when Motorola chose to use a Linux-based platform in 2003. As a result, Sony Ericsson was the main licensee for UIQ.

On 7 November 2006, Sony Ericsson announced they had agreed (in principle) to buy UIQ Technology from Symbian Ltd. and run it as a separate subsidiary. The UIQ products would be "openly available, licensed on equal terms to all its licensees". The acquisition was completed in February 2007. Interestingly this meant Sony Ericsson got back this division that was originally created by them in 1998 (as Ericsson, before the joint venture with Sony).

On 15 October 2007, Sony Ericsson and Motorola announced an agreement for Motorola to purchase a 50% interest in UI Holdings BV, the legal parent company of UIQ Technology. The two companies worked and invested jointly in the development of UIQ.

=== End of UIQ ===
With the establishment in 2008 of the Symbian Foundation led by Nokia (and which both Sony Ericsson and Motorola joined), UIQ's future was in doubt. S60 was the UI choice of Symbian Foundation; UIQ would contribute its assets to the foundation. Patrick Olsson of Sony Ericsson announced on 21 October 2008 at the Smartphone Show 2008 in London that UIQ didn't make the cut, it didn't attract the operator, manufacturer or consumer interest needed to stop it from failing.

Sony Ericsson funded the company for a few months to help management to restructure or find a buyer. On 5 January 2009, UIQ Technology filed for bankruptcy and ceased to exist.

== Timeline ==
1998

- Spring - Ericsson Mobile Communications in Lund set up a development lab in Ronneby called Mobile Applications Lab. This was the precursor of UIQ Technology.
- June - Symbian Ltd. was established in London.

1999

- 1 April - The company became part of Symbian Ltd, and the new company name was Symbian AB. Work was focused on Quartz 6.0, which was the pen-based communicator later known as UIQ.
- December - Number of permanent employees: 21

2000

- February - Quartz was publicly announced.
- May - Johan Sandberg was appointed General Manager.
- September - The first product release of Quartz 6.0 was made.
- December - Number of permanent employees: 78.

2001

- April - Quartz 6.1 was released.
- December - Number of permanent employees: 76.

2002

- February - The company name was changed to UIQ Technology AB and the product was renamed UIQ.
- March - UIQ 2.0 was released.
- December - Number of permanent employees: 85.
- December - The first UIQ phone, Sony Ericsson P800, was released.
- December - UIQ Selected Partner Program was launched for UIQ 2.1.

2003

- February - UIQ 2.1 was made public.
- October - The first UIQ 2.1 based phone, Sony Ericsson P900, reached the market. Motorola A920 was launched.
- December - Number of permanent employees: 102.

2004

- February - UIQ 3 was announced at 3GSM.
- February - Motorola A925, Sony Ericsson P910, BenQ P30, Motorola A1000 reached the market.
- December - Number of permanent employees: 110.
- December - UIQ Selected Partner Program was launched for UIQ 3.

2005

- September - First UIQ 3 phone was announced - the Sony Ericsson P990
- September - UIQ developer program launched

2006

- February - Second and third UIQ 3 phones are announced - the Sony Ericsson M600 and the Sony Ericsson W950 - as the platform moves into high volume, mid-tier devices
- February - UIQ developer program launches premium level membership and hosts WDF developer track at 3GSM
- November - Sony Ericsson announces that it has agreed to buy UIQ Technology

2007

- February - UIQ 3.1 is released followed shortly by the SDK.
- February - The Motorola RIZR Z8 is announced.
- February - Sony Ericsson finishes the acquisition of UIQ Technology from Symbian Ltd.
- May - The Sony Ericsson P1i is announced.
- October - Motorola acquires 50% interest in UIQ Technology parent company UI Holdings BV.

2008

- March - UIQ 3.3 was announced.

2009

- January - UIQ files for bankruptcy following the announcements of the open source Symbian Foundation earlier in 2008.

== See also ==
- UIQ
- List of UIQ 3 Phones
