= C-Dogs =

1997 video game

- Platform(s): MS-DOS
- Release: 1997
- Genre(s): Shoot 'em up
- Mode(s): Single-player, multiplayer

C-Dogs, the sequel to Cyberdogs, is a shoot 'em up video game where players work cooperatively during missions and against each other in "dogfight" deathmatch mode.

== Gameplay ==
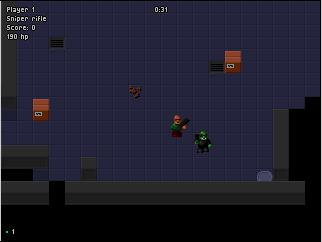
Gameplay screenshot

In C-Dogs, players play through a number of campaigns made of a variable number of missions. Each mission has a selection of weapons and different objectives, such as killing enemies, collecting items, destroying objects, or rescuing a hostages. The campaigns can be played by a single player or with one cooperative player. Other features include color-coded keys to access locked rooms, friendly characters, and neutral civilians that penalize the players if attacked.

C-Dogs also includes a 2-player, split-screen deathmatch mode called "dogfight": players attempt to kill each other for a fixed number of rounds, and the player winning the most rounds wins. Players can be controlled by keyboard, joysticks or gamepads.

Compared to Cyberdogs, C-Dogs includes the following enhancements:

- Multiple campaigns - 5 included, with user-created missions available for download online. Missions also include short story-driven briefings.
- Different level layouts
- Deathmatch mode
- More NPC types: friendlies that attack enemies, hostages, and neutral civilians
- Custom campaign editor
- More weapons, including different types of grenades

The feature to buy and sell weapons and ammo between levels was removed.

== Development ==
The creator of C-Dogs, Ronny Wester, released the precursor to C-Dogs, Cyberdogs, in 1994. The popularity of Cyberdogs and the limitations of its 16-bit protected mode motivated Wester to write a sequel, which was released between the years 1997 to 2001 as freeware.

=== Open source ===
In 2000 Wester released the Borland Pascal 7 source code of Cyberdogs (minus some libraries he had licensed) on his website. In 2002, Wester released the source code of C-Dogs to the public. As of June 2007, Wester no longer maintains a website for C-Dogs but the game continues to live on via the C-Dogs SDL project hosted on GitHub. In April 2016, Wester released the game assets as CC-BY.

==== C-Dogs SDL ====
Following the source code release in 2002, Jeremy Chin and Lucas Martin-King ported the game to SDL and released their work under the GNU GPL-2.0-or-later as C-Dogs SDL. The open source software port contains a number of enhancements to the original C-Dogs, including high-resolution support, local multiplayer up to four players, enhanced graphics and LAN multiplayer. In October 2015, C-Dogs SDL was updated to SDL2. Version 1.0.0 released on August 21, 2021, with support for Wolfenstein 3D and Spear of Destiny missions.

=== Ports ===
With the source code availability and the initial SDL port, the game was ported later for many platforms: Android, GCW Zero, GP2X, Dingoo, PlayStation Portable, Dreamcast, Nintendo DS, Wii, Amiga OS, UIQ3 devices such as SE M600, P1i, P990, and Motorola RIZR Z8.

== Reception ==
Hardcore Gaming 101 reviewed C-Dogs in May 2017.

== See also ==
- List of open source games
