= Nexperia (processor) =

Line of processors by NXP Semiconductors

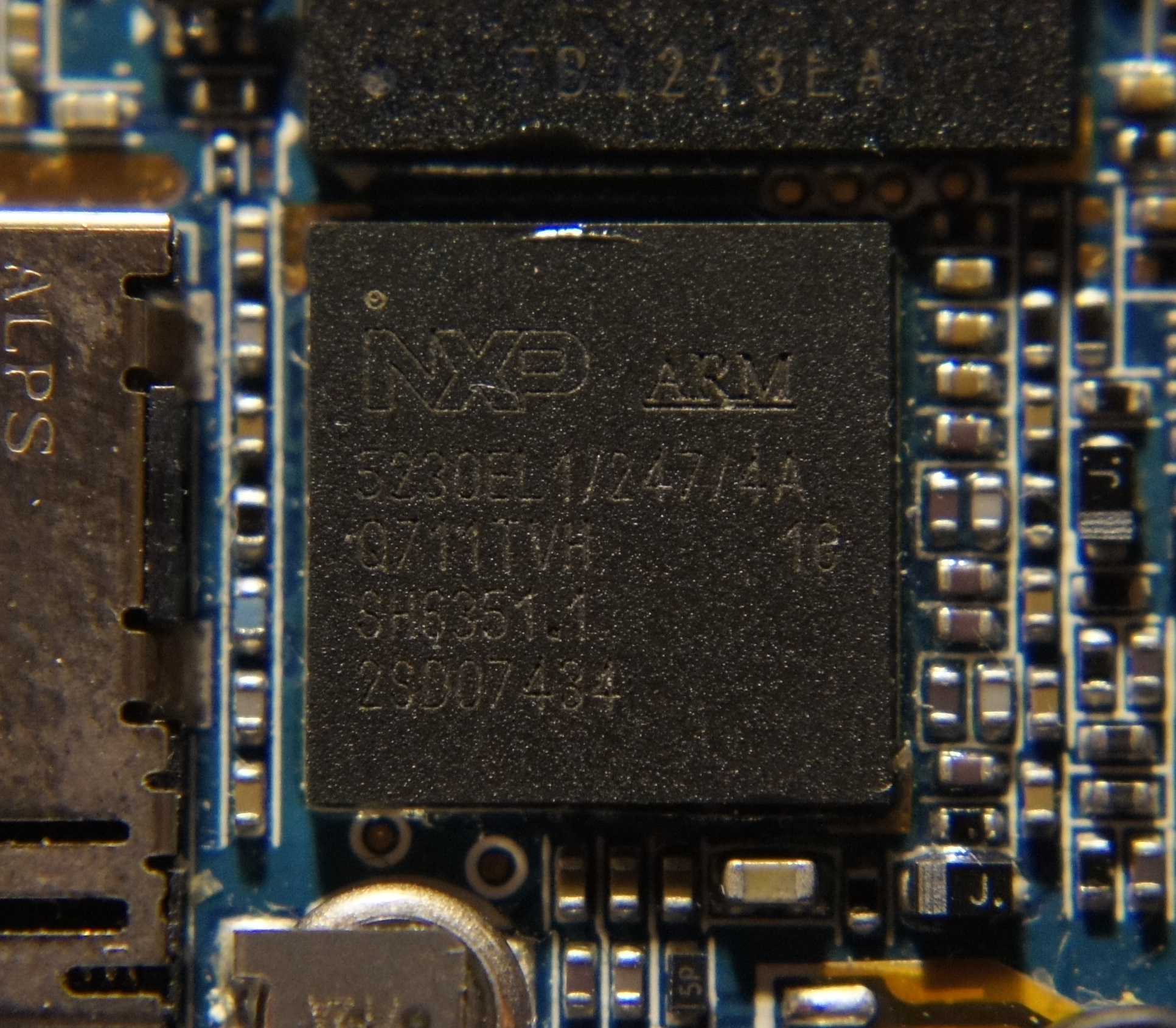
NXP's Nexperia PNX5230 SoC on Samsung's SGH-E250 motherboard

Nexperia was the NXP Semiconductors (formerly Philips Semiconductors) brand for a family of processors, primarily featuring media processor system-on-chip (SoC) and media co-processors, but also briefly including highly integrated mobile (SoC) products.

== Nexperia media processors ==
Philips Semiconductor began producing processors for multimedia applications, under the TriMedia brand. Later model SoC processors with greater integration were sold under the Nexperia brand.

=== PNX1300 ===
The PNX1500 was a basic media processor, designed for DVD players, set-top boxes, and internet appliances. Featuring a 200 MHz TriMedia CPU core, DVD decryption/descrambling, partial hardware acceleration for MPEG-1 and MPEG-2 decoding, and 10/100 Ethernet support. It was designed to be a pin-compatible successor to the TriMedia TM-1300.

=== PNX1500 ===
The PNX1500 was a media processor SoC. Featuring the 266 MHz TriMedia TM3260 CPU core, 2D graphics acceleration, and MPEG-1 and MPEG-2 decoding, and 10/100 Ethernet support. It was designed to be code compatible with the PNX1300.

=== PNX1700 ===
The PNX1700 was an HD media processor SoC for connected media devices, like set-top boxes, PVRs and TV's, announced in March 2005. This media chip included a 500 MHz TriMedia TM5250 CPU core, 10/100 Ethernet, and an LCD controller, and was capable of decoding HD video formats, including Windows Media Video, DivX, MPEG-4 and MPEG-2, and able to perform simultaneous encode and decode of full D1 resolution MPEG-2 and MPEG-4 video, including support for H.264 codec. The 1700 was pin-compatible with the predecessor PNX1500.

=== PNX5100 ===
Full-HD video post processor.

== Nexperia mobile phone processors ==
Philips Semiconductor had been producing Nexperia mobile chips since 1999. These included application processors, imaging co-processors, and both baseband and RF supporting components.

=== Nexperia PNX4000 ===
The PNX4000 was publicly launched by Philips Semiconductor in November 2003, as an imaging co-processor for mid-range camera-phone devices.

This processor was featured in a number of Sony Ericsson phones, even before the public release of the chip:

- Sony Ericsson P800 (Sep 2002)
- Sony Ericsson P900 (Jan 2003)
- Sony Ericsson P910 (2004)

=== Nexperia 6100 platform ===
Nexperia 6100 cellular system solution was launched in February 2005, and was a platform that includes an ARM9 processor, and support for EDGE. The platform supports Java with JSR 135 Mobile Multimedia API. This platform was used for the 2006 Samsung SGH-P200.

=== Nexperia 7130 platform ===
Nexperia 7130 cellular system solution was also launched in February 2005, and extended on the 6100 platform with support for 2.75G/EDGE and 3G/UMTS.

=== Nexperia 5130 platform ===
Nexperia Cellular System Solution 5130 was a $5 part designed to enable low cost (~$20) basic phones, and featured an ARM7 baseband processor (OM6357).

=== Nexperia 5210 platform ===
The Nexperia Cellular System Solution 5210 was launched in November 2005. This system platform was designed for basic mobile phones, and included the PNX5230 cellular baseband chip, which featured a 130 MHz ARM946E-S system controller core, EDGE data support, and support for 1.3MP camera sensors with a built-in JPEG encoder. One popular model featuring the PNX5230 was the Samsung SGH-E250 slider phone.

=== Nexperia PNX4008 SoC ===
The PNX4008 SoC was launched on February 7, 2005, as the first 90 nm ARM9 SoC CPU. This processor included PowerVR 3D graphics from Imagination Technologies for hardware-accelerated 3D graphics (80 MHz: 160Mpix/s, 1Mpolygons/s), and security IP from Discretix.

Philips claimed that consumers could have up to 100 hours of uninterrupted audio playback on their MP3 players due the chips' low power usage.

In September 2006, Philips formed NXP as a spin-out of their semiconductor division. The Nexperia PNX4008 was then used as the foundation for the subsequent LPC processor series from NXP.

This processor was used in a number of Sony Ericsson phones, including:

- Sony Ericsson P990(Oct 2005)
- Sony Ericsson P1 (May 2007)
- Sony Ericsson M600 (Feb 2006)
- Sony Ericsson W950 (Feb 2006)
- Sony Ericsson W960 (Jun 2007)

=== Nexperia PNX4009 SoC ===
- Sony Ericsson G700 and G700c
- Sony Ericsson G700 Business Edition
- Sony Ericsson G900
- Sony Ericsson 'Paris' P200

Following the formation of the ST-NXP Wireless joint venture in 2008, and subsequent ST-NXP/Ericsson merger to form ST-Ericsson in 2009, later mobile processors were launched by ST-Ericsson under the brand 'NovaThor', thus bringing an end to the Nexperia mobile line.

== See also ==
- TriMedia - the TriMedia CPU line used in the Nexperia media processors
- Nomadik - competing mobile processor line from STMicro
- NovaThor - successor mobile processor line from the ST-Ericsson joint-venture
