= Jog dial =

Type of knob, ring, wheel or dial used as a device control

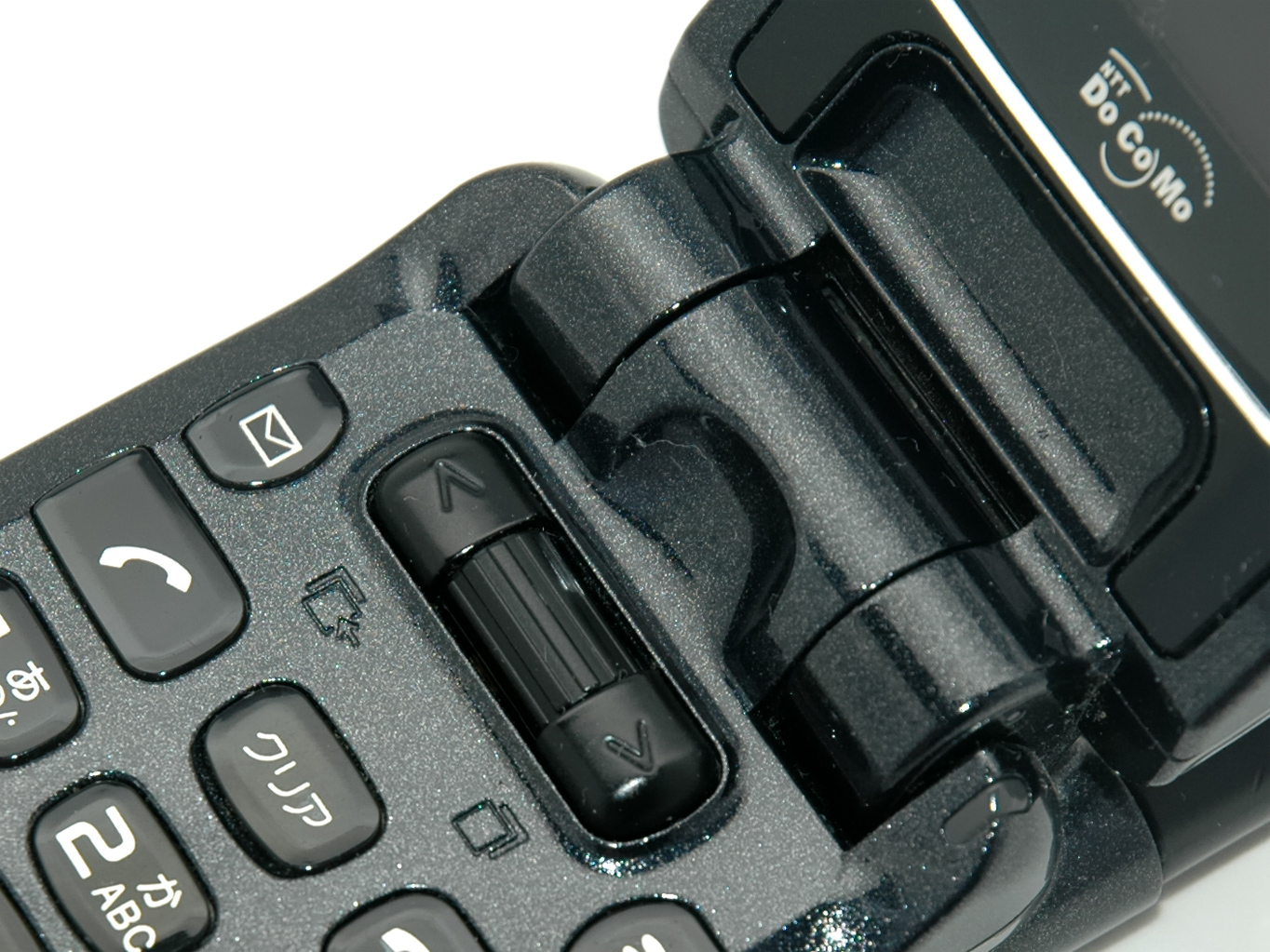
Jog Dial (at center of image) by Sony Ericsson

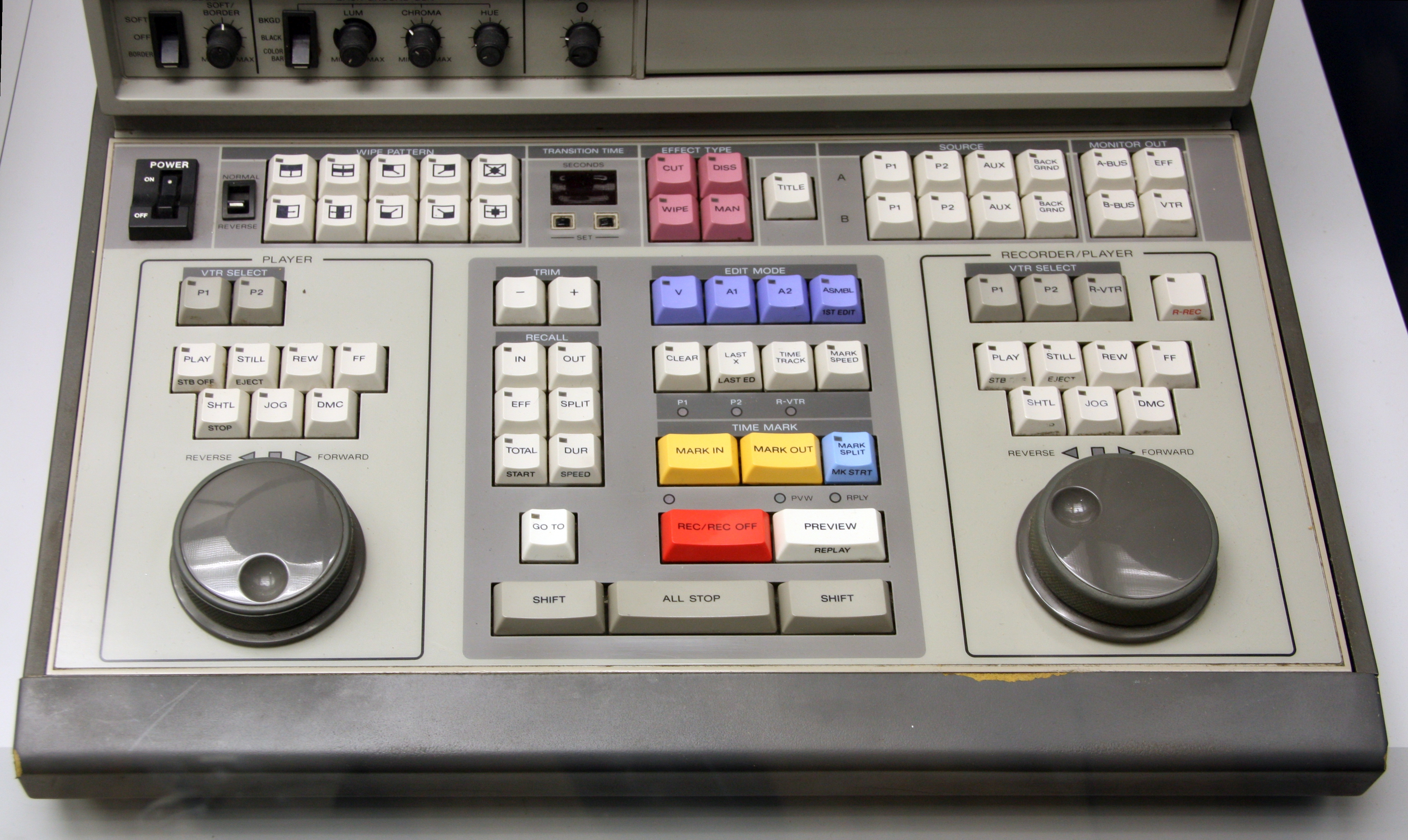
Edit controller for the analog professional video format U-Matic. With two jog dials for controlling one VCR as source and one as a recorder, c. 1980s

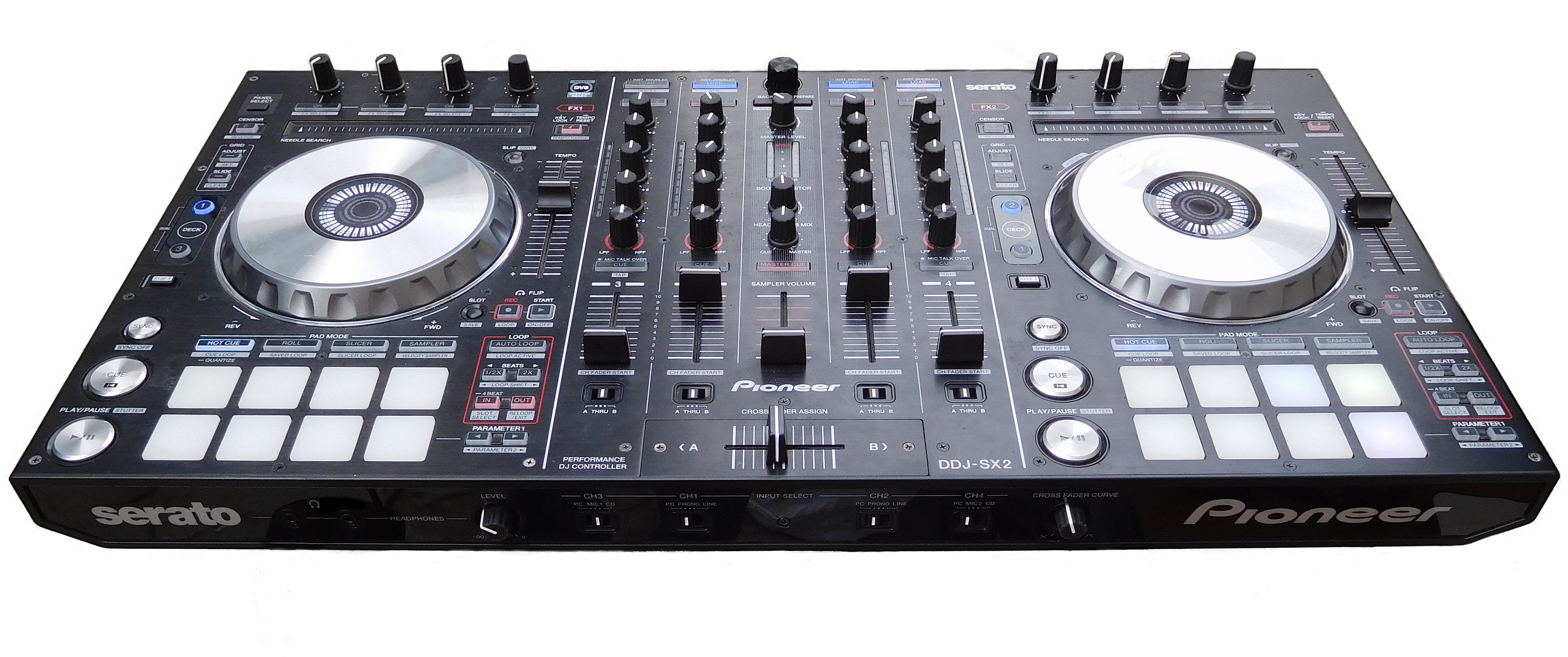
A DJ controller for controlling a DJ mixing software (e.g., a vinyl emulation) together with digital music files stored on a computer, with two jog dials each having about the size of a compact disc

A jog dial, jog wheel, shuttle dial, or shuttle wheel is a type of knob, ring, wheel, or dial which allows the user to shuttle or jog through audio or video media. It is commonly found on models of CD players which are made for disc jockeys, and on professional video equipment such as video tape recorders. More recently, they are found on handheld PDAs, and as the scroll wheel on computer mice. "Jog" refers to going at a very slow speed, whereas "shuttle" refers to a very fast speed.

There are two basic types of wheels. One type has no stops and can be spun the entire way around, because it is a rotary incremental encoder. This type depends on tracking the actual motion of the dial: the faster it spins forward or back, the faster it fast-forwards or rewinds. Once the dial stops moving, the media continues playing or remains paused at that point. Another type has stops on either side, and often has three or so speeds which depend on how far it is turned. Once the wheel is released, it springs back to the middle position and the media pauses or begins playing again.

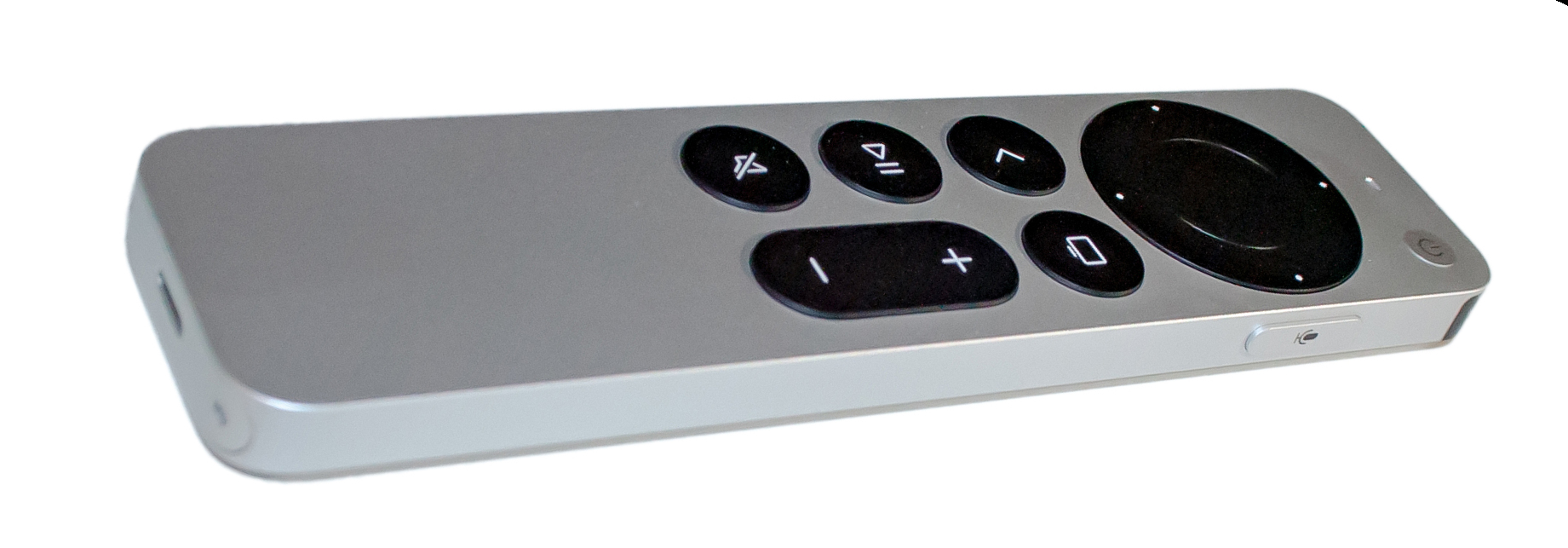
The remote control for the Apple TV (here 2nd gen.) has a jog dial function for scrolling through videos, as well as the competing Fire TV.

If the device is set or designed to pause after the wheel is used, the audio is often stuttered, repeating a small section over and over again. This is usually done by DJs using CDJs or DJ controllers, for the purpose of beatmatching, and is equivalent to an earlier turntablist DJ moving a phonograph record back and forth slightly to find the physical location of a starting beat within the groove. On the video, the pause is a freeze frame of the current video frame.

Sony Corporation held a patent for a 5-way version of the jog dial. A 5-way jog dial allows up and down scrolling, right and left deflections, and a press-to-click action. Such jog dial was a feature of the Sony CLIÉ PDA series and Sony Ericsson P800, P900 and P910 smartphones. A 5-way jog dial has not been used by Sony or its subsidiaries since 2006.

== See also ==
- iPod click wheel
- Dial box
- Jogcon
