= Ericsson R380 =

Mobile phone model released in 2000

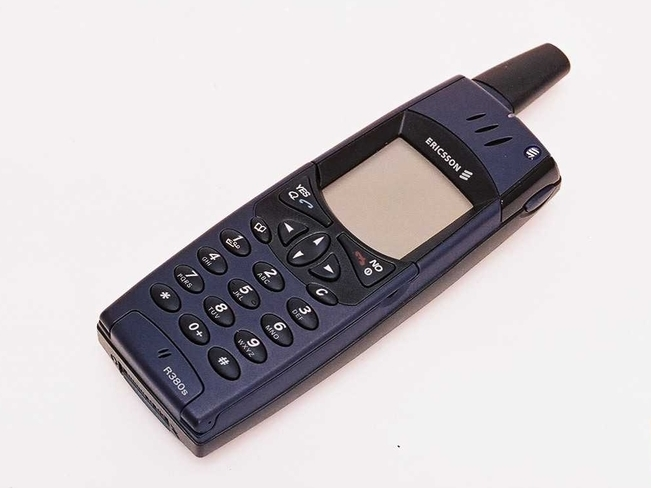
In closed keypad form

The Ericsson R380 is a GSM cellular phone developed by Ericsson Mobile Communications, combining the functions of a mobile phone and a personal digital assistant (PDA). It was introduced at CEBIT on 19 February 1999 and began shipping around September 2000, being the first mobile device to be marketed as a 'Smartphone'.

It was a groundbreaking product of its time as it was as small as a normal mobile phone and relatively light (160g) despite containing advanced features normally only found on PDAs. The R380 has a keypad flip that opens to reveal a touch-sensitive display. It runs on the EPOC operating system and a notable feature was the inclusion of WAP for mobile Internet services. In December 1999, before it was released, the magazine Popular Science appointed Ericsson R380 to one of the most important advances in science and technology.

The device was delivered in three variants: the most common being the R380s (dual 900/1800 GSM bands) which was the originally introduced model, and the less common R380 World (dual 900/1900 GSM bands) which was intended for the American market but kept the GSM 900 band for worldwide roaming, and was announced on November 14, 2000. The final variant with minor software and cosmetic upgrades as well as improved battery life was designated the R380e: it was announced on September 21, 2001.

== Hardware ==
The display was a black and white touchscreen, partially covered by a flip which, when opened, reveals a large wide display. For that reason it can be considered the clear forerunner of the popular P800/P900 series of smartphones. It predates the UIQ user interface which runs on those later phones, but again, the heritage is clear.

== Software ==
The R380 ran the EPOC Release 5.1 operating system (EPOC R5u, a Unicode version of EPOC R5), which can thus be considered the first Symbian OS device. It uses a sophisticated user interface that originated as 'Emerald', one of the device family reference designs (DFRD) that was planned by Symbian Ltd. However users could not install their own software on the device.

The phone and the software was developed at Ericsson's lab in Kista, Sweden. The user interface (UI) was developed at Ericsson's Software Applications Laboratory in Warrington, UK. The UI was built using an in-house developed library called the Ericsson Component Kit (ECK).

At introduction, the R380s pricing was around US$700 (compared to the T28s at US$500), and the device was never network-locked.

== See also ==
- Nokia 9210 Communicator
