= P800 =

P800 may refer to:

- Sony Ericsson P800, a mobile phone released in 2002
- P-800 Oniks, a Soviet/Russian cruise missile
- P800, a tax refund form issued by HM Revenue and Customs in the United Kingdom
- P800, a V4 engine manufactured by Puch in the 1930s
