= P30 =

P30 or P-30 may refer to:

== Automobiles ==
- BRM P30, a British racing car
- Toyota Publica (P30), a Japanese subcompact car

== Military ==
- Consolidated P-30, a fighter aircraft of the United States Army Air Corps
- GNS Anzone (P30), a ship of the Ghana Navy
- Maltese patrol boat P30
- Grendel P30, an American pistol in production 1990–1994
- Heckler & Koch P30, a German pistol in production since 2006
- INS Kiltan (P30), a corvette of the Indian Navy
- P-30 radar, a Soviet radar system

== Science ==
- p30 (protein), an actin-binding protein
- Phosphorus-30, an isotope of phosphorus
- Pioneer P-30, a failed space probe
- Prostate specific antigen

== Smartphones ==
- BenQ P30, introduced in 2004
- Huawei P30, introduced in 2019

== Other uses ==
- P30 (Latvia), a regional road
- Papyrus 30, a biblical manuscript

== See also ==
- P3O, with a letter O instead of a zero
