= Sony Ericsson W960 =

Smartphone model

Sony Ericsson W960i
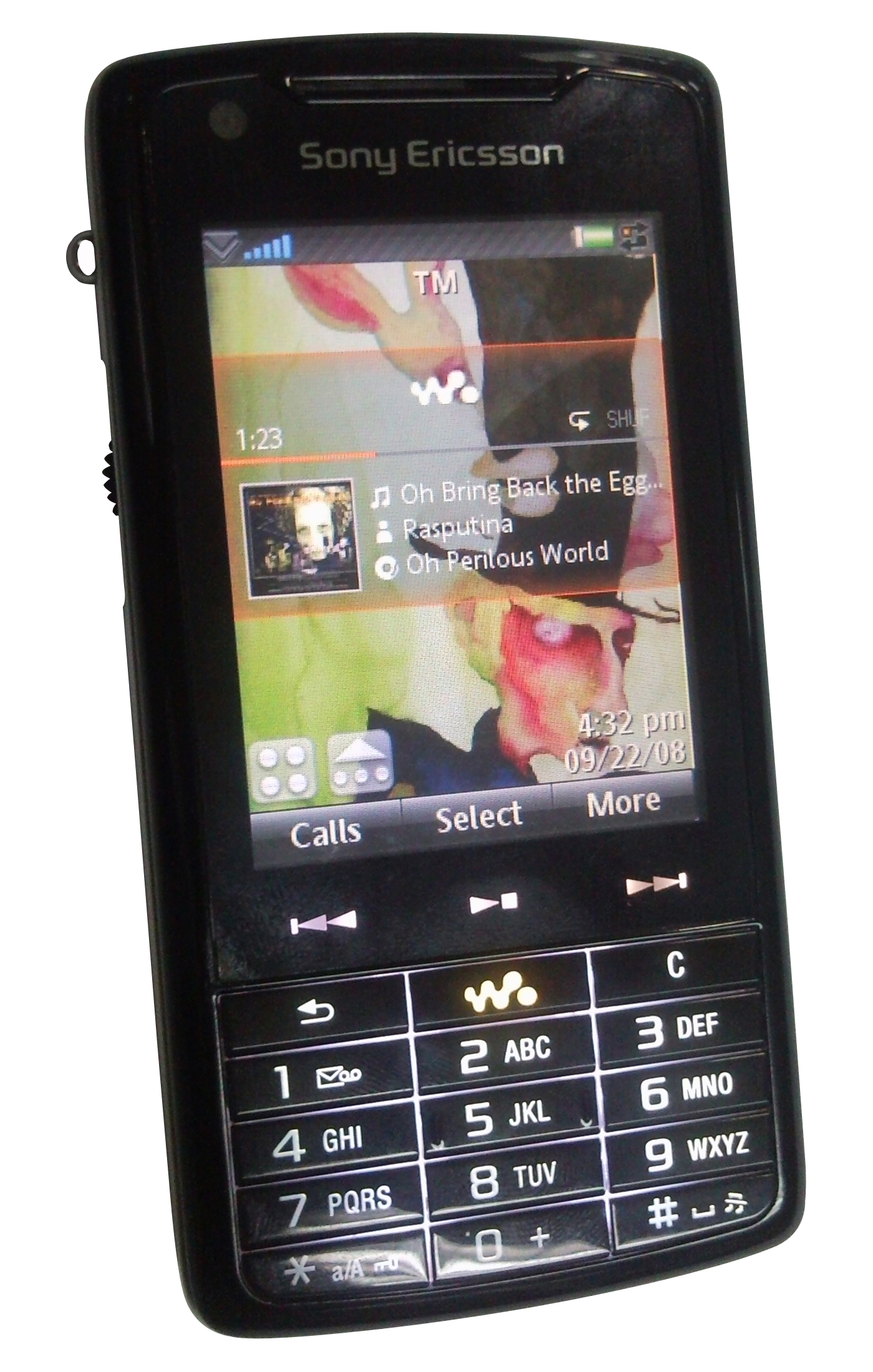
- Manufacturer: Sony Ericsson
- Predecessor: Sony Ericsson W950
- Compatible networks: GSM 900/1800/1900 + UMTS 2100
- Dimensions: 109 x 55 x 16 mm
- Weight: 119 g
- Operating system: UIQ 3 / Symbian OS v9.1
- Memory: 8 GB flash memory
- Battery: BST-33
- Display: 240 x 320 pixels, 2.6”, 262K colors, touchscreen
- Connectivity: USB 2.0, Wi-Fi, Bluetooth 2.0 + EDR, A2DP supported

The Sony Ericsson W960i is a UIQ 3 smartphone based on Symbian OS v9.1. It was announced on June 14, 2007.

== Background ==
The W960i is part of Sony Ericsson's Walkman series of phones and succeeds the W950i. One of its distinguishing features is its 8 GB of internal flash memory. It does not support memory expansion through memory cards.

== Hardware ==
Like its predecessor, the W950i, the W960i uses the UIQ 3 software platform, based on Symbian OS 9.1. It features a 2.6-inch touchscreen displaying 262,144 colors (18-bit color depth) at a resolution of 240 x 320 pixels.

The device is powered by a Philips Nexperia PNX4008 ARM9 processor running at 208 MHz. It has 128 MB of RAM, 256 MB of flash ROM (96 MB reserved for the operating system and 160 MB available to the user), and 8 GB of internal storage. It also includes a 3.2-megapixel autofocus camera with an LED flash and video recording capabilities. Connectivity options include Wi-Fi 802.11b, Bluetooth 2.0 with A2DP support, and USB 2.0.

The W960i supports GSM 900, 1800, and 1900 MHz alongside UMTS 2100 MHz and GPRS.

== Gallery ==
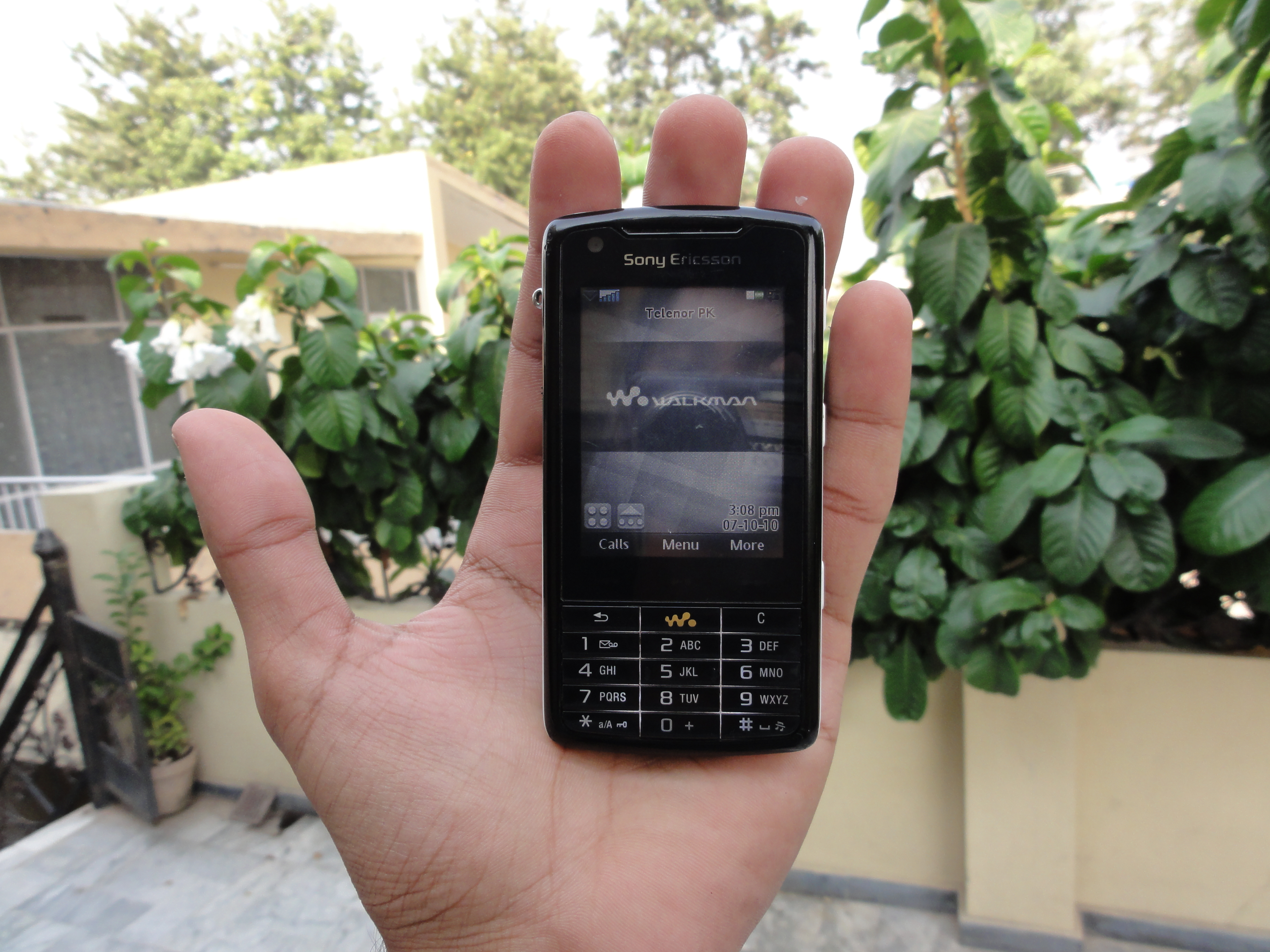

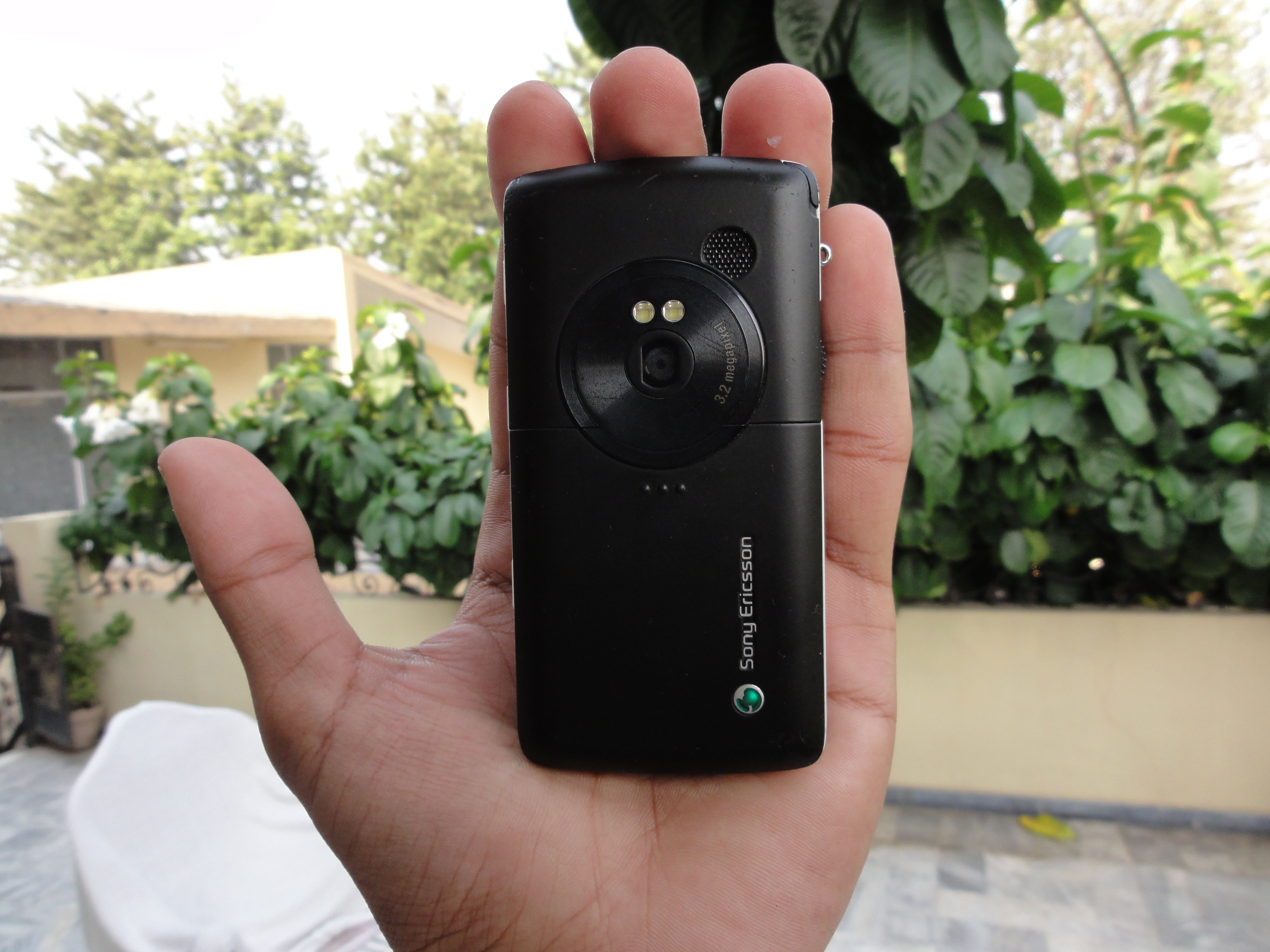

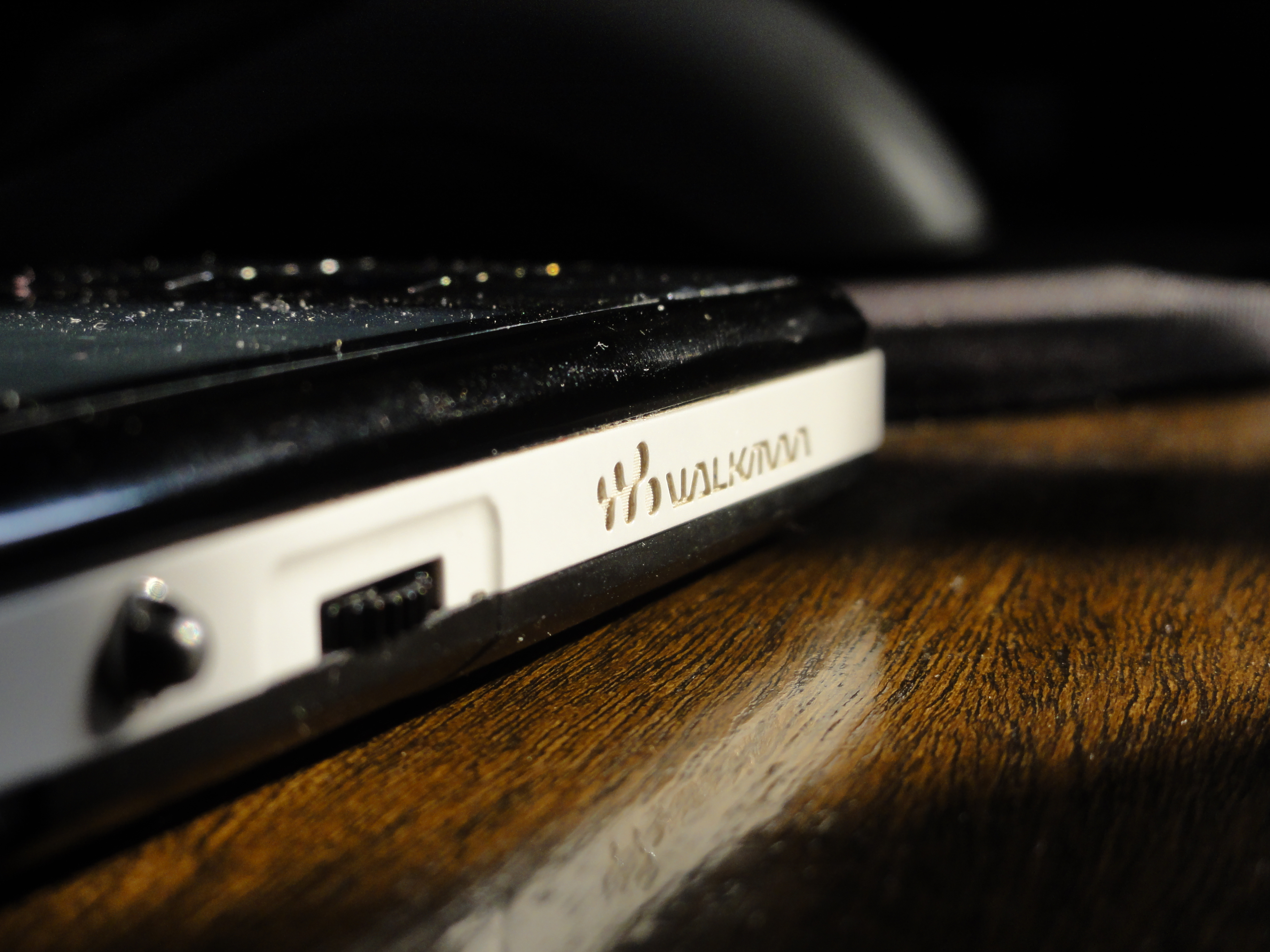

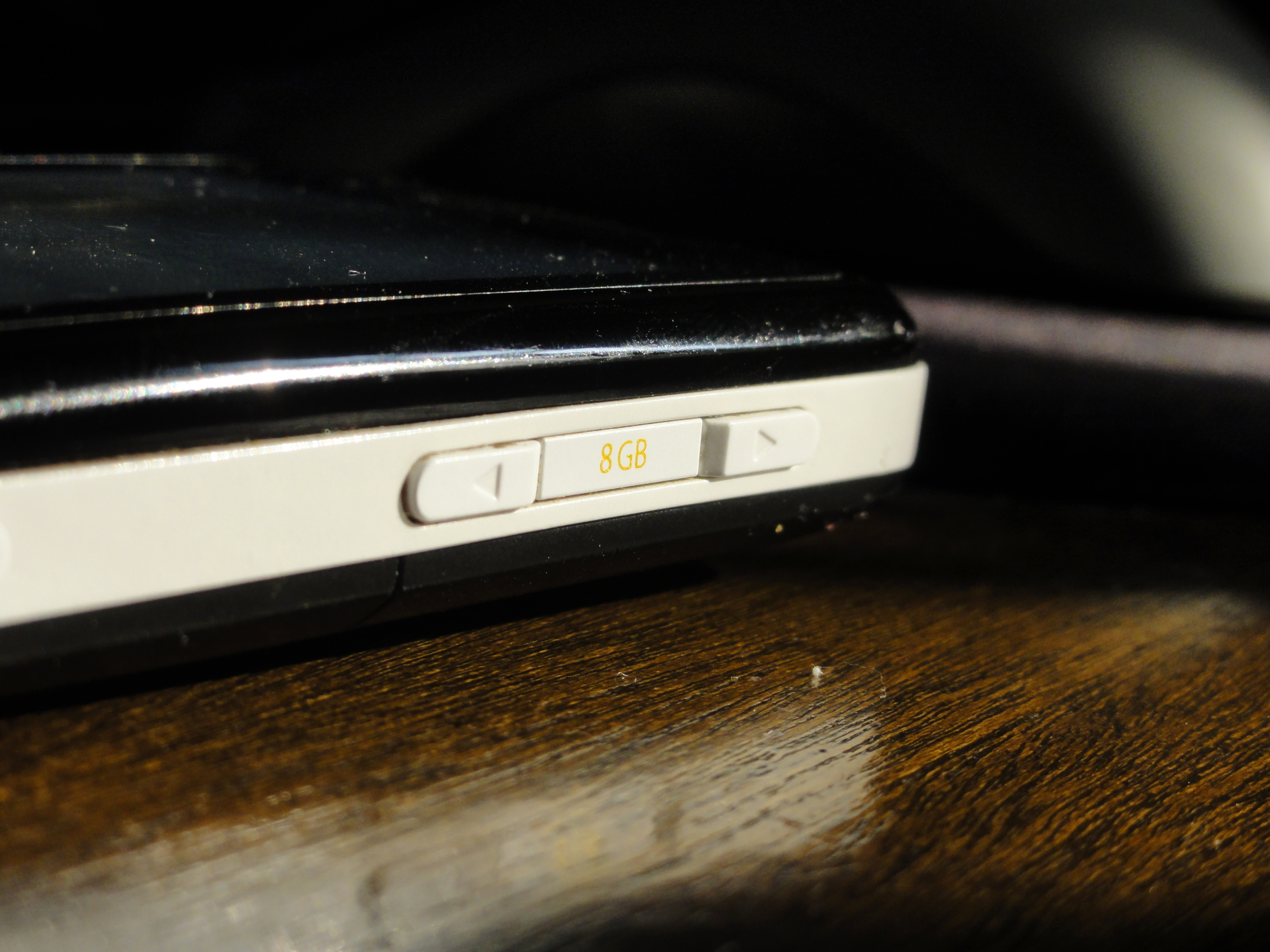
