= Symbian Software =

Software development company

Symbian Software Ltd.
- Type: Private company limited by shares
- Industry: Software, business services
- Predecessor: Psion
- Founded: 1998; 28 years ago
- Defunct: 2 December 2008; 17 years ago
- Fate: Acquired by Nokia
- Successor: Symbian Foundation (2008–2011)
- Headquarters: Southwark, London, England
- Area served: Worldwide
- Key people: Juha Christensen, Colly Myers, David Levin, Nigel Clifford
- Products: Symbian OS
- Number of employees: 1,178 (2007)
- Subsidiaries: UIQ Technology (until 2007)

Symbian Ltd. was a software development and licensing consortium company, known for the Symbian operating system (OS), for smartphones and some related devices. Its headquarters were in Southwark, London, England, with other offices opened in Cambridge, Sweden, Silicon Valley, Japan, India, China, South Korea, and Australia.

It was established on 24 June 1998 as a partnership between Psion, Nokia, Ericsson, Motorola, and Sony, to exploit the convergence between personal digital assistants (PDAs) and mobile phones, and a joint-effort to prevent Microsoft from extending its desktop computer monopoly into the mobile devices market. Ten years to the day after it was established, on 24 June 2008, Nokia announced that they intended to acquire the shares that they did not own already, at a cost of €264 million. On the same day the Symbian Foundation was announced, with the aim to "provide royalty-free software and accelerate innovation", and the pledged contribution of the Symbian OS and user interfaces.

The acquisition of Symbian Ltd. by Nokia was completed on 2 December 2008, at which point all Symbian employees became Nokia employees. Transfer of relevant Symbian Software Ltd. leases, trademarks, and domain names from Nokia to the Symbian Foundation was completed in April 2009. On 18 July 2009, Nokia's Symbian professional services department, which was not transferred to the Symbian Foundation, was sold to the Accenture consulting company.

== Overview ==
Symbian Ltd. was the brainchild of Psion's next generation mobile operating system project following the 32-bit version of EPOC. Psion approached the other four companies and decided to work together on a full software suite including kernel, device drivers, and user interface. Much of Symbian's initial intellectual property came from the software arm of Psion.

Symbian Ltd developed and licensed Symbian OS, an operating system for advanced mobile phones and personal digital assistants (PDAs).

Symbian Ltd wanted the system to have different user interface layers, unlike Microsoft's offerings. Psion originally created several interfaces or "reference designs", which would later end up as Pearl (smartphone), Quartz (Palm-like PDA), and Crystal (clamshell design PDA). One early design called Emerald also ended up in the market on the Ericsson R380.

Nokia created the Series 60 (from Pearl), Series 80 and Series 90 platforms (both from Crystal), whilst UIQ Technology, which was a subsidiary of Symbian Ltd. at the time, created UIQ (from Quartz). Another interface was MOAP(S) from NTT Docomo. Despite being partners at Symbian Ltd, the different backers of each interface were effectively competing with each other's software. This became a prominent point in February 2004 when UIQ, which focuses on pen devices, announced its foray in traditional keyboard devices, competing head-on with Nokia's Series 60 offering whilst Nokia was in the process of acquiring Psion's remaining stake in Symbian Ltd. to take overall control of the company.

== Shareholding ==
The company's founder shareholders were Psion, Nokia and Ericsson. Motorola joined the Symbian consortium shortly later, gaining the same 23.1% stake as Nokia and Ericsson in October 1998. Matsushita followed in May 1999 paying £22 million for an 8.8% stake. This was followed by Siemens taking 5% in April 2002 and Samsung also taking 5% in February 2003.

Motorola sold its stake in the company to Psion and Nokia in September 2003.

In February 2004, Psion, the originator of Symbian, intended to sell its 31.1% stake in the company to Nokia. This caused unease amongst other shareholders as Nokia would gain majority control of the company, with Sony Ericsson in particular being a vocal critic. The deal finalised with the stake shared between Nokia, Matsushita, Siemens and Sony Ericsson in July 2004, with Nokia holding a 47.9% share.

== Decline ==
The decline of Symbian Ltd. has been tied to Nokia's fate. By 2007, it enjoyed a high level of success with its operating system running one of every two mobile phones bearing the Nokia logo so that it claimed 65 percent of the mobile market. Its Symbian OS continued to dominate the market until Nokia acquired the company in its entirety in 2008, creating it as an independent non-profit organization called Symbian Foundation. Nokia donated the assets of Symbian Ltd. as well as the Nokia's S60 platform to the new entity with the goal of developing an open-source and royalty-free mobile platform.

Nokia, however, began to lose its market share with the emergence of Apple's iPhone and Google's Android. To address this, Nokia abandoned the Symbian OS in favor of Windows Phone OS for its mobile devices, shipping its last Symbian handset in 2013. Having lost its biggest supporter and caretaker, Symbian was absorbed by Accenture, which is supposed to maintain it until 2016. The prior Symbian Foundation has transitioned into a licensing entity with no permanent staff, claiming on its website that it is responsible for only specific licensing and legal frameworks put in place during the open sourcing of the platform.

== Licensees ==
Licensees of Symbian's operating system were: Arima, BenQ, Fujitsu, Lenovo, Matsushita, Motorola, Nokia, Samsung, Sharp, Siemens and Sony Mobile.

== Key people ==
Symbian Ltd's CEO at the time of acquisition was Nigel Clifford. Prior CEOs included David Levin, who left in 2005 to head United Business Media, and the founding CEO, Colly Myers, who left the company in 2002 to found IssueBits, the company behind text messaging Short Message Service (SMS) information service Any Question Answered (AQA).

== See also ==
- Symbian Foundation
- Symbian OS
