= Samsung SGH-E250 =

Samsung mobile phone

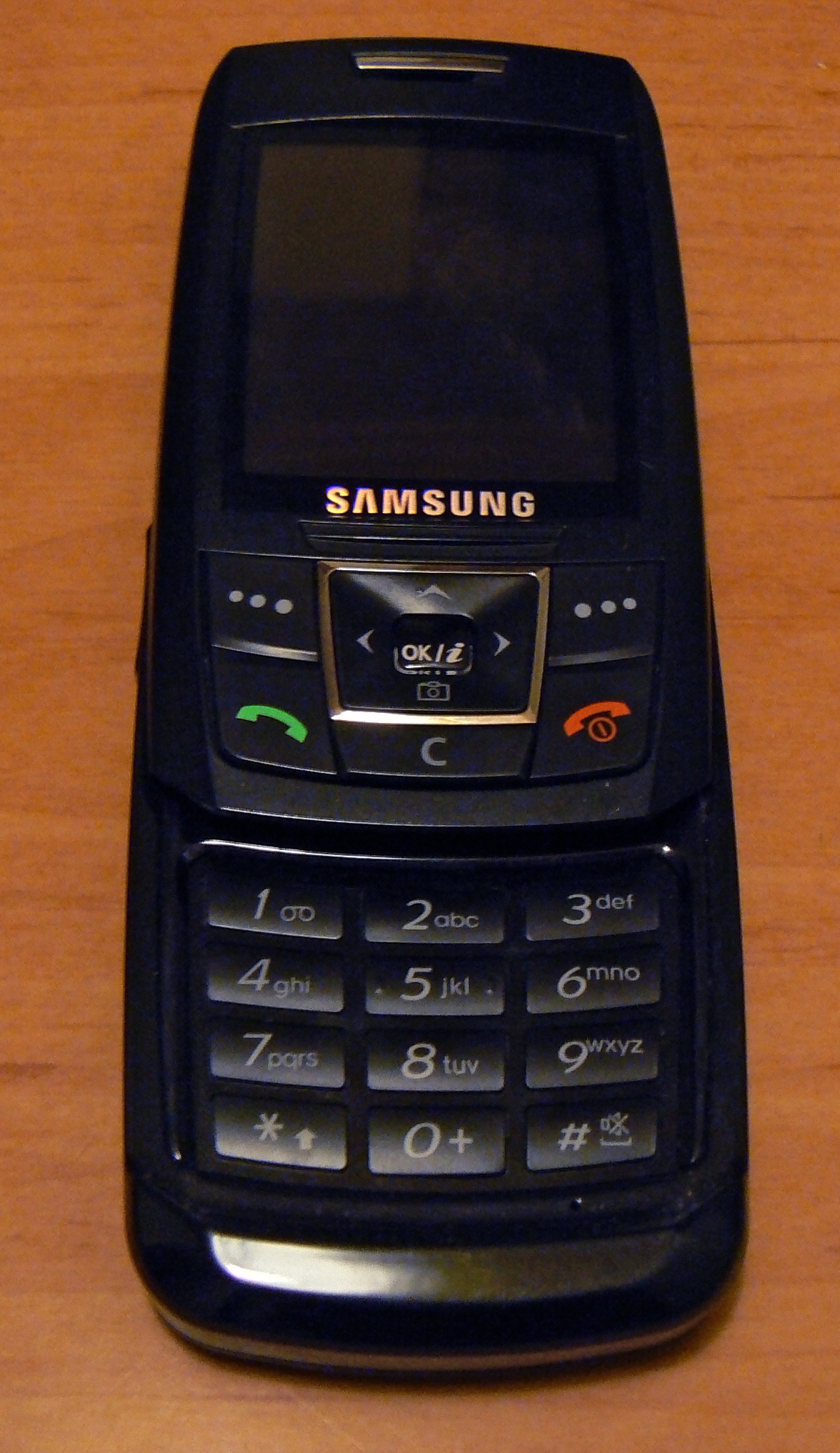
- Manufacturer: Samsung Electronics
- Series: E series
- Availability by region: 18 October 2006; 19 years ago
- Units sold: 30 million
- Units shipped: 3.3 million
- Related: Samsung D900 Samsung D900i
- Compatible networks: EDGE/ GPRS Class 10 Tri Band (900/1800/1900 MHz) WAP 2.0 Java MIDP 2.0
- Form factor: Slider
- Dimensions: 3.92 X 1.95 X .56 in (99.5 x 49.5 x 14.1 mm)
- Weight: 3 oz (85 g)
- Operating system: Proprietary
- CPU: Philips/NXP Nexperia PNX5230 @230MHz
- Memory: 10 MB
- Removable storage: microSD
- Battery: 3.7V 750 mAh Li-Ion
- Rear camera: 0.3 megapixel
- Display: 128x160 pixels, 65,536 color display TFT LCD
- Sound: Polyphonic Sound 64 channels, MP3
- Connectivity: Bluetooth 2.0 (with Stereo A2DP), USB 1.1
- Codename: Lime

The Samsung E250 Australian Packaging

The Samsung SGH-E250 is a mobile phone that was introduced in October 2006 as an entry-level version of the Samsung D900/D900i (ULTRA edition 12.9). The E250 has very similar features to the D900/D900i, but the screen resolution is roughly half of that of the D900 and the camera is only 0.3MP compared to the D900/D900i's 3MP camera.

In 2008, Samsung Electronics also introduced the SGH-E250i/SGH-E250V, a dual band variant version of the SGH-E250, for GSM 900 and 1800 MHz networks. The Samsung SGH-E250i/E250V, which shares its design of the E250, has an 800 mAh battery instead of E250's 750 mAh and features VGA camera, 2.0" display, Bluetooth, MP3 player, and FM radio with recording. It has some visual improvements in the software along with background music playback and standard MP3 ringtones compared to the SGH-E250.

Samsung E250 was a huge success for the company, becoming Samsung's first phone to reach the 20 million sales mark, by February 2008.

== Features ==
The SGH-E250 is a tri-band phone with many of the basic features of its time. It has a VGA resolution camera, a microSD slot for expanding its 10MB internal memory up to 2GB, Bluetooth 2.0 (with A2DP support), an FM radio, MPEG4 player, an integrated web browser, tools such as a calculator, calendar, alarm clock, timer, stopwatch, world clock, unit converter, and a number of included Java games: Cannonball, Forgotten Warrior, Freekick, Arch Angel, Asphalt2, Minigolf Las Vegas-T&B, and Paris Hilton's Diamond Quest.

The volume of the Samsung SGH-E250 can be increased using the code:*#8999*8378#. But, in case of the SGH-E250D (black colour) variant that was released later, the code: *#0206*8378# is to be used. (This process can be found elsewhere).

== Performance ==
The E250, with its 10MB internal Flash storage space, are expandable via microSD card. Also, the E250 is made with an ARM9-230 MHz processor, allowing for very fast processing. It cannot perform multitasking, and the media player cannot be minimized. However, the radio can be used whilst performing other tasks. Games and applications must be installed on the phone through the stock web browser by navigating to the respective sites which contains applications for the phone. They cannot be installed by any other method. The phone also does not support Java 3D. But, some variants do support it experimentally by entering the following code: *#52828378#. Alternatively 3D graphics can be achieved in software thanks to the fast ARM9 processor as it was done on the Tapwave Zodiac.

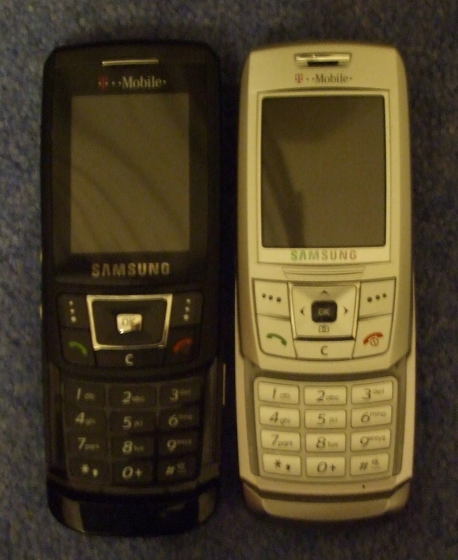
The Samsung D900 (left) and E250 (right)

== Design ==
The SGH-E250 phone is built as a slide-out phone, where the TALK, END, MENU and directional pad are on the top half. The bottom half, which slides out, holds the number keys. This classic modern phone is available in black, silver, pink, lilac, and crystal.
