= Samsung SGH-E250i =

Mobile phone model

- Manufacturer: Samsung Electronics
- Series: E series
- First released: 2008
- Availability by region: 2008-2011
- Predecessor: Samsung SGH-E250
- Successor: Samsung SGH-E251
- Related: Samsung D900
- Compatible networks: EDGE/ GPRS Class 10 Dual Band (900/1800 MHz) WAP 10.1 Java MIDP 10.1
- Form factor: Slider
- Dimensions: 3.92 × 1.95 × 0.56 in (99.5 × 49.5 × 14.1 mm)
- Weight: (80.8 g)
- Operating system: Proprietary (J2ME based)
- CPU: ARM9 (230MHz)
- Memory: 20 MB
- Storage: 4GB
- Removable storage: MicroSD
- Battery: 3.7V 800 mAh Li-Ion
- Rear camera: 0.3 megapixel
- Display: 128×160 pixels, 65.536 color display TFT LCD
- Connectivity: Bluetooth 2.0 (with Stereo A2DP), USB 1.1

The Samsung E250 Australian Packaging

The Samsung SGH-E250i mobile was introduced in 2008 as a dual band (900 and 1800 MHz) variant version of the tri band (900, 1800 and 1900 MHz) Samsung SGH-E250.

The official Samsung India site declares that the E250i is an "E250 relaunched with superior features" such as background music and advanced mobile tracker.

The E250i has the same design as the E250 and very similar features like GPRS, EDGE, VGA camera, 2.0" display, Bluetooth, MP3 player and FM radio with recording. Another difference between E250i and E250 is that E250i has an 800 mAh battery instead of E250's 750 mAh.

The maximum SAR value of the Samsung SGH-E250i is 0,951 W/Kg

== Features ==
Design:

- Slider
- Weight: 80.8g
- Dimensions (mm): 99.5 × 49.5 × 14.1

Platform:

- Network & Data: GSM/GPRS
- Band: 900/1800 MHz
- CPU: ARM9 (230 MHz)
- Operation System: Proprietary
- Java: Yes

Display:

- Technology: 65k QQVGA
- Resolution: 128×160/176×144
- Size (inch): 2.0

Battery:

- Type: AB463446BU
- Capacity: 800 mAh
- Talk Time: up to 10 hours
- Standby: up to 243 hours

User interface:

- Keyboard

Camera:

- Resolution: VGA
- Zoom: digital 4X
- Shot Mode
- Photo Effects

Video:

- Video player
- Video recording
- Video messaging (MMS)

Music and sound:

- Ringtones: 64 Polytone
- Music Player
- Voice recording
- MP3 Ringtones
- Music Library

Fun and entertainment:

- Embedded JAVA games
- Embedded
- FM Radio

Business and office:

- Document Viewer
- Offline Mode
- Voice Memo & Voice Mail

Messaging:

- SMS / MMS
- Predictive Text Input T9
- Email
- Cell Broadcast
- vCard / vCalendar

Connectivity:

- Bluetooth
- WAP
- SyncML(DS)
- USB
- PC Sync Application
- Internet HTML Browser

Memory:

- User Memory: 14 MB
- Expandable memory: MicroSD (up to 2 GB)
- Scheduler
- Clock
- Calendar
- Alarm
- Calculator
- Stopwatch
- Countdown Timer

Call functions:

- Speakerphone
- Dialed / Missed / Received Calls memory
- Multy Party
- Caller ID
- Call Time
