= Sony Ericsson P1 =

Mobile phone model

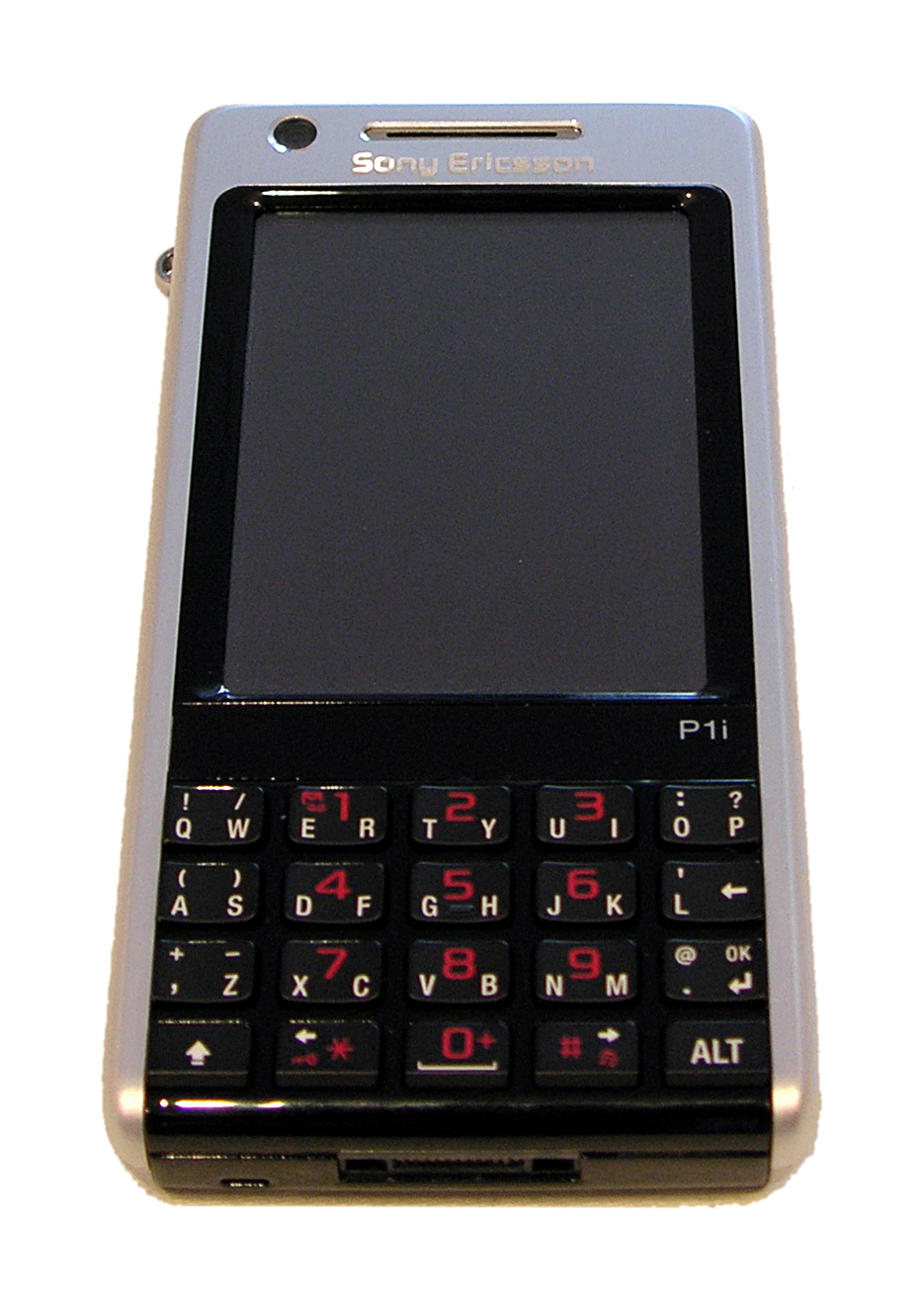
- Manufacturer: Sony Ericsson
- Availability by region: Q3 2007
- Predecessor: P990 & P910
- Successor: Sony Ericsson Xperia X1; Sony Ericsson Satio; Sony Ericsson G700; Sony Ericsson G900; Sony Ericsson Paris (cancelled)
- Related: List of Sony Ericsson products
- Compatible networks: UMTS, GSM
- Dimensions: 106×55×17 mm (4.17×2.17×0.67 in)
- Weight: 124 g (4 oz)
- Operating system: UIQ 3 / Symbian OS v9.1
- CPU: ARM9 PNX4008 at 208 MHz
- Memory: 128 MB RAM, 256 MB ROM
- Removable storage: Memory Stick Micro (M2)
- Rear camera: 3.2-megapixel 3x digital zoom
- Front camera: VGA 640x480
- Display: 240 x 320 TFT 262,144 colors
- Connectivity: 802.11b, Bluetooth, IrDA
- Data inputs: Keypad / Touchscreen

The Sony Ericsson P1 is a mobile phone and the successor of the P990. It was the last of the Sony Ericsson "P" Smartphone series, introduced in 2002 with the Sony Ericsson P800 and it integrates many of the hardware features of its predecessor the P990 in the form factor of the M600. It was announced on 8 May 2007. There is a Chinese version of P1 called P1c. Compare with P1/ P1i, P1c lacks of 3G, thereby using EDGE which is much slower but more available especially in the US and parts of Europe.

The phone uses the UIQ 3.0 software platform, which is based upon Symbian OS 9.1. It is slightly thicker than the M600 as a result of the new hardware features, but this is reportedly largely indiscernible. It is nonetheless considerably thinner than the P990 (25% smaller - as the official press review states).

== Key improvements ==
While the phone used the same Nexperia PNX4008 processor as its predecessor, the included RAM was doubled to 128 MB, resulting in significantly more free RAM after boot-up. As a result of its increased RAM, the P1's multitasking performance was far more stable than that of the first series of UIQ 3 phones from Sony Ericsson (P990, M600 and W950). The boot speed, when compared to the P990, is also discernibly faster.

The P1 uses the form factor of the M600 and consequently shares its screen size of 2.6 inches, making it 0.2 inches smaller than its predecessor. However, due to the new transflective layer on its LCD, legibility under direct sunlight has been improved on the P1. This addresses a common problem faced by owners of the P990.

The phone has 256 MB of built-in flash memory; twice as much as its predecessor, with 160 MB available to the user. The phone also supports expansion using Memory Stick Micro slot cards, up to 16 GB in size.

== Main features ==
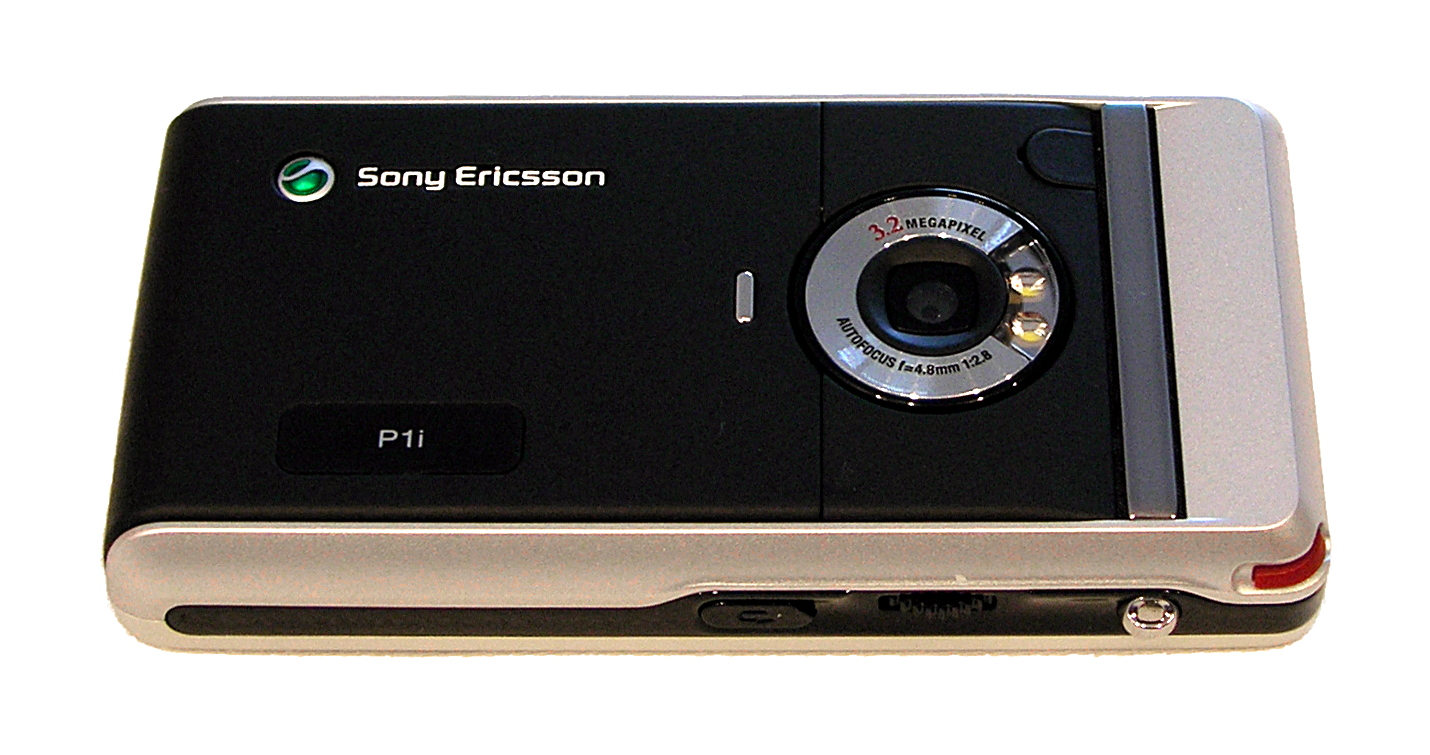

- 3.15 MP camera with autofocus, Video - QVGA 320x240 15fps, LED flash, 3X digital zoom, Business Card Scanning and Picture Blogging
- Rocker QWERTY Keyboard with two letters sharing on one key (key pressed left for one letter and right for the other letter)
- Video Telephony (uses both front and back cameras)
- 256 MB Flash, 160 MB user free memory
- 128 MB RAM (79 MB free on startup)
- Symbian OS v9.1 UIQ 3.0
- 512 MB Memory Stick Micro (M2) bundled on package
- OptiMobile VoIP client (not included)
- FM Radio with Equalizer & RDS support (AF, TA, NEWS), Gracenote TrackID service
- Enhanced standby screen - can have up to 15 applications shortcuts now, instead of 5 (on P990, M600 and W950 respectively)
- "Record Conversation" is not available
- QuickOffice Document reader and editor, pdf+ reader
- Black list sms and call

== Other business and multimedia features ==
- Bluetooth stereo (A2DP)
- Media player
- Melody composer/MIDI (MusicDJ)
- Music tones
- PlayNow

Internet

- RSS feeds
- Web browser Opera Web

Entertainment

- 3D games
- Java (not full - without Java ME capture protocol for cameraphone)
- Video clip
- Video streaming

Connectivity

- 3G
- WiFi
- UMTS
- Bluetooth
- Fast port
- GPRS
- Infrared port
- Modem
- USB mass storage
- USB support

Messaging

- Email
- BlackBerry (push e-mail)
- MMS (Multimedia Messaging)
- Predictive text input
- Push email
- SMS long (Text Messaging)
- Sound recorder (does not work during call)
- Track ID

Communication

- Conference calls
- Speakerphone
- Vibrating alert
- VideoPhone (FaceTime)

Design

- Jog dial
- Picture wallpaper
- Animated screensaver

Organiser

- Alarm clock (only on turned on phone)
- Business card exchange
- Calculator
- Calendar
- Document editors
- File manager
- Flight mode
- Handwriting recognition
- Notes
- Phone book
- Stopwatch
- Tasks
- Timer
- Touchscreen

== Networks ==
- UMTS / GSM 900 / GSM 1800 / GSM 1900
- 3G 384 kbit/s
- Wi-Fi 802.11b 11 Mbit/s

== Top ranking in Greenpeace report ==
The P1 model was rated among the most green phones 2007, alongside the Sony Ericsson T650i and Nokia N95 in the report Searching for green electronics
