= Sony Ericsson W950 =

Cell phone model

Sony Ericsson W950i
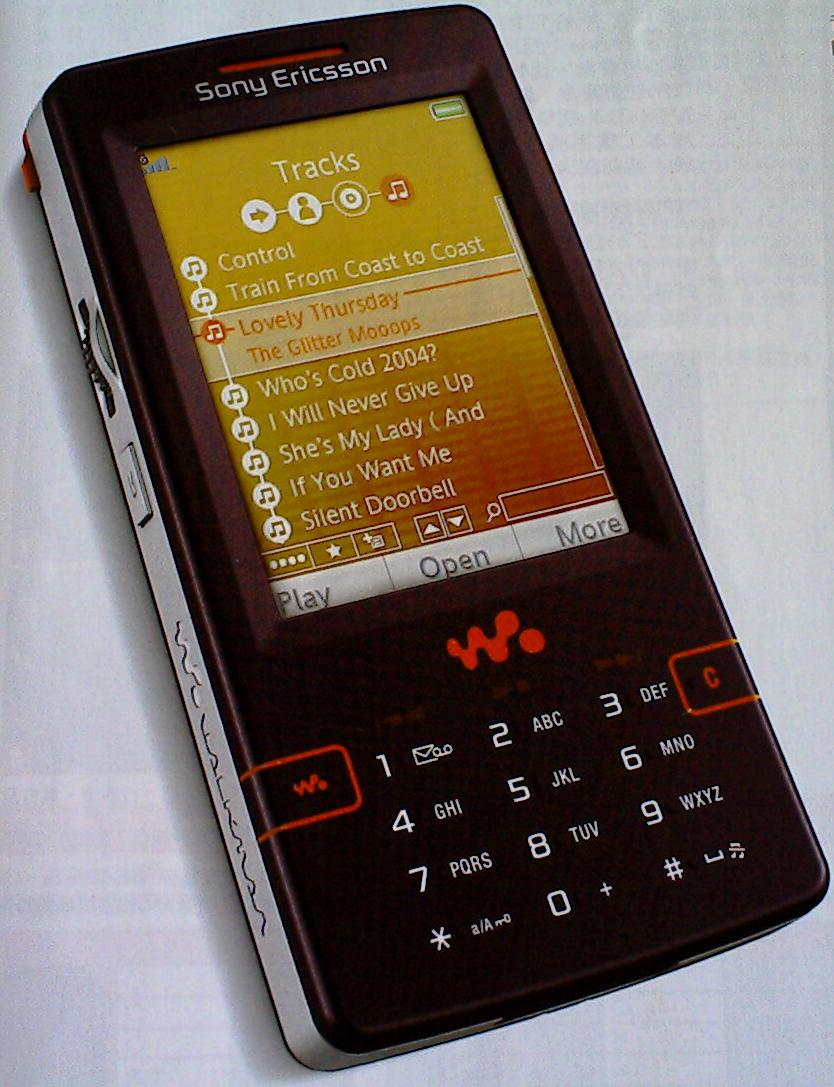
- Manufacturer: Sony Ericsson
- Availability by region: 2006 first half
- Successor: Sony Ericsson W960
- Compatible networks: GSM, UMTS
- Dimensions: 106×54×15 mm (4.17×2.13×0.59 in)
- Weight: 112 g (4 oz) with battery
- Operating system: UIQ 3 / Symbian OS v9.1
- Memory: 4 GB internal flash drive
- Removable storage: None
- Battery: BST-33
- Rear camera: None
- Display: 240x320, 67mm
- Connectivity: Bluetooth 2.0
- Data inputs: Keypad / Touchscreen

The Sony Ericsson W950i is the third UIQ 3 smartphone based on Symbian OS v9.1. It was announced on February 13, 2006, a week after the announcement of the Sony Ericsson M600.

== Background ==
The W950 is Sony Ericsson's sixth 'Walkman'-series phone. One of its distinguishing features is the 4 GB of internal flash memory, which can be used for media storage. However, it does not support memory expansion through memory cards.

The device was available in two regional variants: the W950i, which supports GSM 900, 1800, and 1900 MHz alongside UMTS 2100 MHz, and the W958c, a version marketed in China. Both models shared similar hardware.

== Hardware ==
With many core similarities to the M600, the W950 also uses the UIQ 3 software platform, which is based upon Symbian OS 9.1. The touchscreen displays 262,144 colours (18-bit colour depth) with a resolution of 240 x 320 pixels on a 2.6-inch diagonal display. The W950 runs on the Nexperia PNX4008 ARM9 208 MHz processor from Philips and has 64 MB RAM and 128 MB Flash ROM. This processor also includes a PowerVR MBX GPU for hardware-accelerated 3D graphics.

== Developing for the W950i ==
Since the W950i is based upon the UIQ platform, it is easy to make third party applications that can be downloaded to the phone. Developers can choose their preferred programming language (Java, C++, etc.) and IDE (Visual Studio, CodeWarrior, Eclipse, Carbide, NetBeans).
