= Sony Ericsson P900 =

2004 mobile phone model

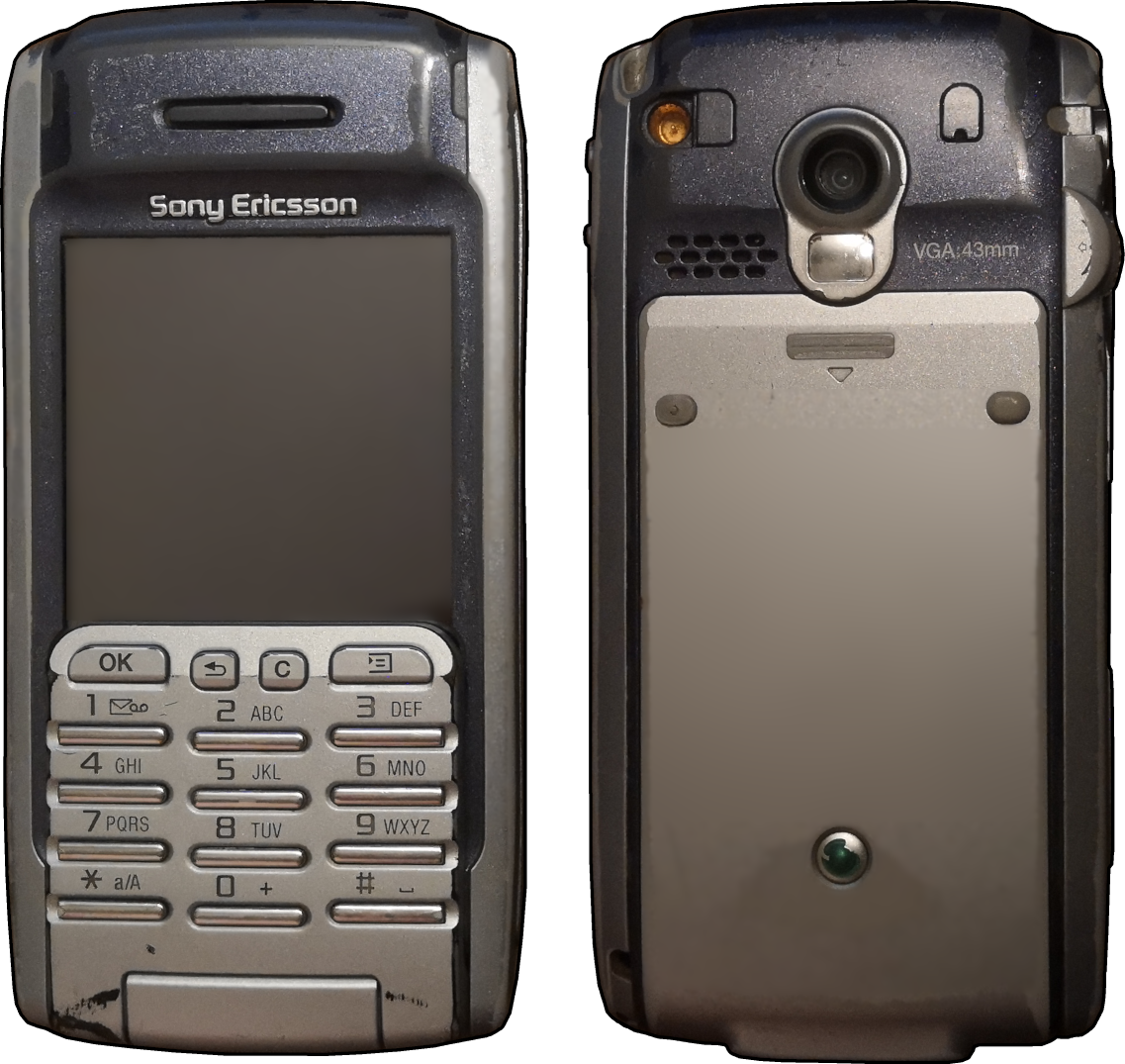
- Brand: Sony Ericsson
- Manufacturer: Sony Ericsson
- Type: mobile phone
- Series: P (PDA)
- First released: January 2004
- Predecessor: Sony Ericsson P800
- Successor: Sony Ericsson P910; Sony Ericsson P990
- Compatible networks: GSM 900/1800/1900
- Form factor: Candybar, PDA
- Dimensions: 115 mm (4.5 in) H 57 mm (2.2 in) W 23.9 mm (0.94 in) D
- Weight: 140 g (4.9 oz)
- Operating system: Symbian OS 7.0, UIQ 2.1
- System-on-chip: Philips Nexperia PNX4000
- CPU: ARM9 @ 156 MHz
- Memory: 16 MB
- Storage: 48 MB (23 MB user available)
- Removable storage: Memory Stick Duo
- SIM: Mini SIM
- Battery: 1260 mAh
- Charging: Proprietary connector
- Rear camera: 0.3 megapixel
- Display: 3 inch 208 × 320 TFT, 65K colors
- Connectivity: Bluetooth, infrared
- Data inputs: Keypad, touchscreen
- Codename: Linn

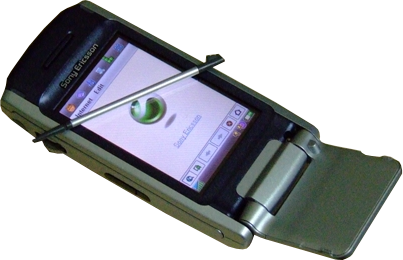
Sony Ericsson P900 with the flip opened

The Sony Ericsson P900 is a Symbian OS v7.0 based mobile phone from Sony Ericsson. It was introduced in 2003 and is the successor of the Sony Ericsson P800; like the P800, the P900 uses the UIQ platform. The P900 was well received and is sometimes considered one of the best Symbian OS devices to have been released. An updated successor was later released called Sony Ericsson P910, while its bigger successor would be Sony Ericsson P990.

== Features ==
The P900 can be used without the flip as well. This makes the phone more like a PDA, but still usable as a traditional phone. The P900 supports Memory Stick Duo cards (but not Memory Stick Pro Duo) up to 128 MB in size, as does the P800. However, it has been confirmed that this 128 MB limit is just a software restriction.

The P900 was the first Sony Ericsson product for which Research in Motion's BlackBerry wireless email service was available.

Some of the specifications of the P900 are:

1. Weight – 150 g (with flip), 140 g (without flip)
2. Internal camera: VGA (display resolution up to 640 × 480 pixels)
3. Connectivity: Bluetooth, Infrared, USB dock
4. GPRS (WAP 2.0)
5. Messaging: SMS, EMS, MMS, POP3, IMAP, SMTP

== Software ==
Like other Symbian-based mobile phone of its time, but unlike Ericsson R380, the P900 is an open phone. This means that it is possible to develop and install third party applications without restrictions. A UIQ 2.1 SDK based upon Symbian C++ is freely available from the Sony Ericsson developer website. Additionally, the P900 supports applications written in Java. Because of this openness, many third-party applications exist that can be used on the P900 and other UIQ phones (such as the Motorola A1000 and BenQ P30). Many are shareware and freeware.

As the P900 uses UIQ version 2.1, it is backwards compatible with UIQ 2.0 as found in the P800. Applications made for the P800 will normally work on a P900 as well. It, like the P800 and P910i, has an ARM9 processor clocked at 156 MHz.

== P910 ==
An updated version of the P900, the Sony Ericsson P910 was released in July 2004. It features a small QWERTY keyboard and enhanced software, as well as double the P900's memory (64 MB, versus the P900's 32 MB) and supports Memory Stick Pro Duo, allowing the phone up to 4 GB of storage on a single card. The P910 has approximately the same battery life as its predecessor.

== 'P905' ==
P905 is the unofficial term for a Sony Ericsson P900 flashed with hacked Sony Ericsson P910a firmware. The P900 is flashed using a 'Fighter Kit'. This is usually done for four reasons:

1. The P900 has a software restriction on the size of the memory card that can be used (128 MB).
2. The P900 software does not support HTML email.
3. The P900 software does not provide an option to alter the screen brightness.
4. Flashing the firmware is cheaper than purchasing a new P910.

Though this may seem all beneficial, there may be the drawback of not being able to connect to certain Bluetooth headsets (however, this is rare).

Though the P905 may be identical to the P910 in software terms they are not identical in hardware terms.
