= Sony Ericsson P800 =

2002 mobile phone model

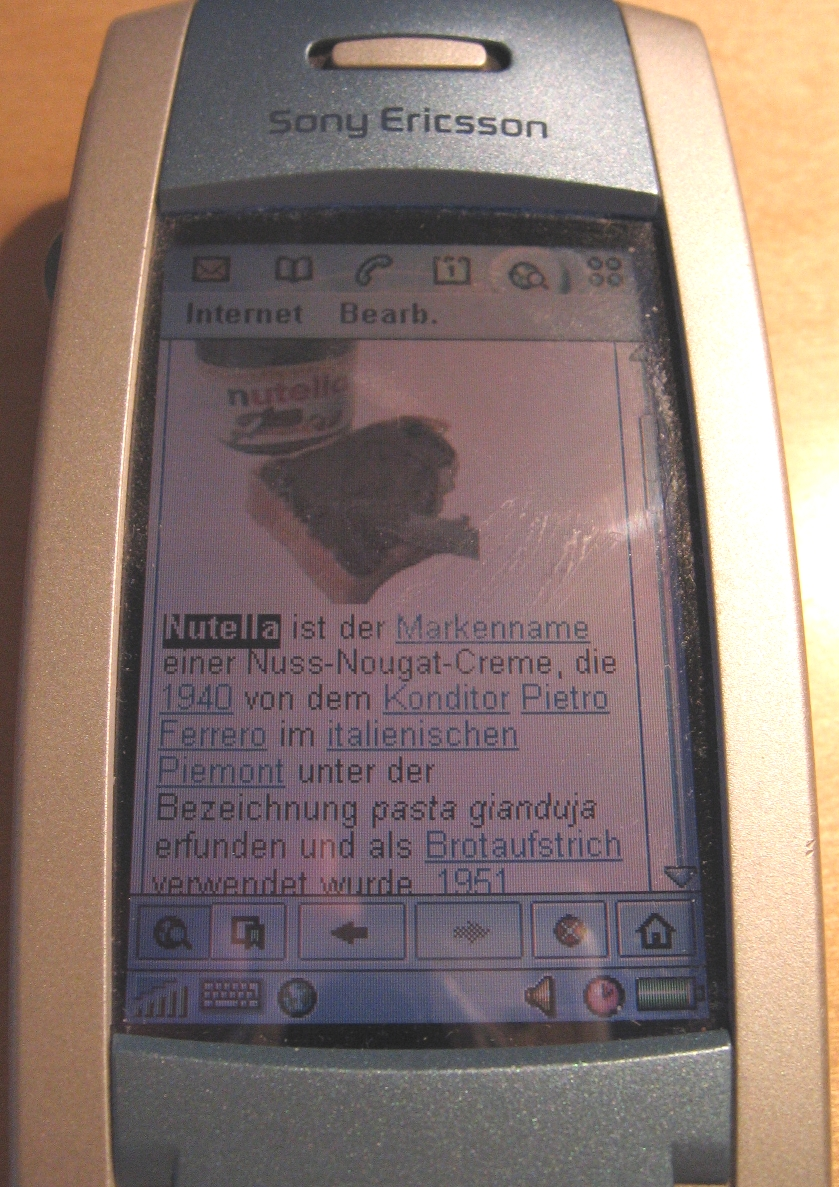
- A P800 displaying Wikipedia in a browser
- Brand: Sony Ericsson
- Series: P
- First released: September 2002
- Predecessor: Ericsson R380
- Successor: Sony Ericsson P900
- Dimensions: 117 mm (H) 59 mm (W) 27 mm (D)
- Weight: 158 g (6 oz)
- Operating system: UIQ
- CPU: 32-bit Philips Nexperia PNX4000 156 MHz processor
- Storage: 16MB
- Removable storage: Stick Up To 128MB
- Battery: Li-Po 1000mAh (BST-15)
- Rear camera: VGA 640×480
- Display: TFT, 208×320 pixel
- Model: P800

The Sony Ericsson P800 is a mobile phone introduced in 2002 based upon UIQ version 2.0 (which itself is based upon Symbian OS v7.0) from Sony Ericsson. The P800 is considered the successor of the Ericsson R380, and initial design work was done within Ericsson, but it was produced after Sony and Ericsson merged their mobile phone businesses.

== Technical information ==
The P800 uses the UIQ (version 2.0) user interface and has a touch screen much like a PDA. It is powered by an ARM9 processor running at 156 MHz, which was also used for the successive models Sony Ericsson P900, Sony Ericsson P910. It came with a 16MB Memory Stick Duo but supports up to 128MB. The touchscreen displays 4,096 colours (12-bit colour depth). It was succeeded in 2003 by the Sony Ericsson P900.

== Later versions and successors ==
An updated version of the "P" series phones, the Sony Ericsson P990 was launched at the Symbian Smartphone Show in September 2005. It is based upon the UIQ3 platform (utilizing Symbian OS v9.1).

The latest successor is the Sony Ericsson P1, announced on 8 May 2007. Whilst using the same UIQ platform as the P990, it has a smaller form factor based on the Sony Ericsson M600 and updated hardware.
