= UIQ =

Software platform

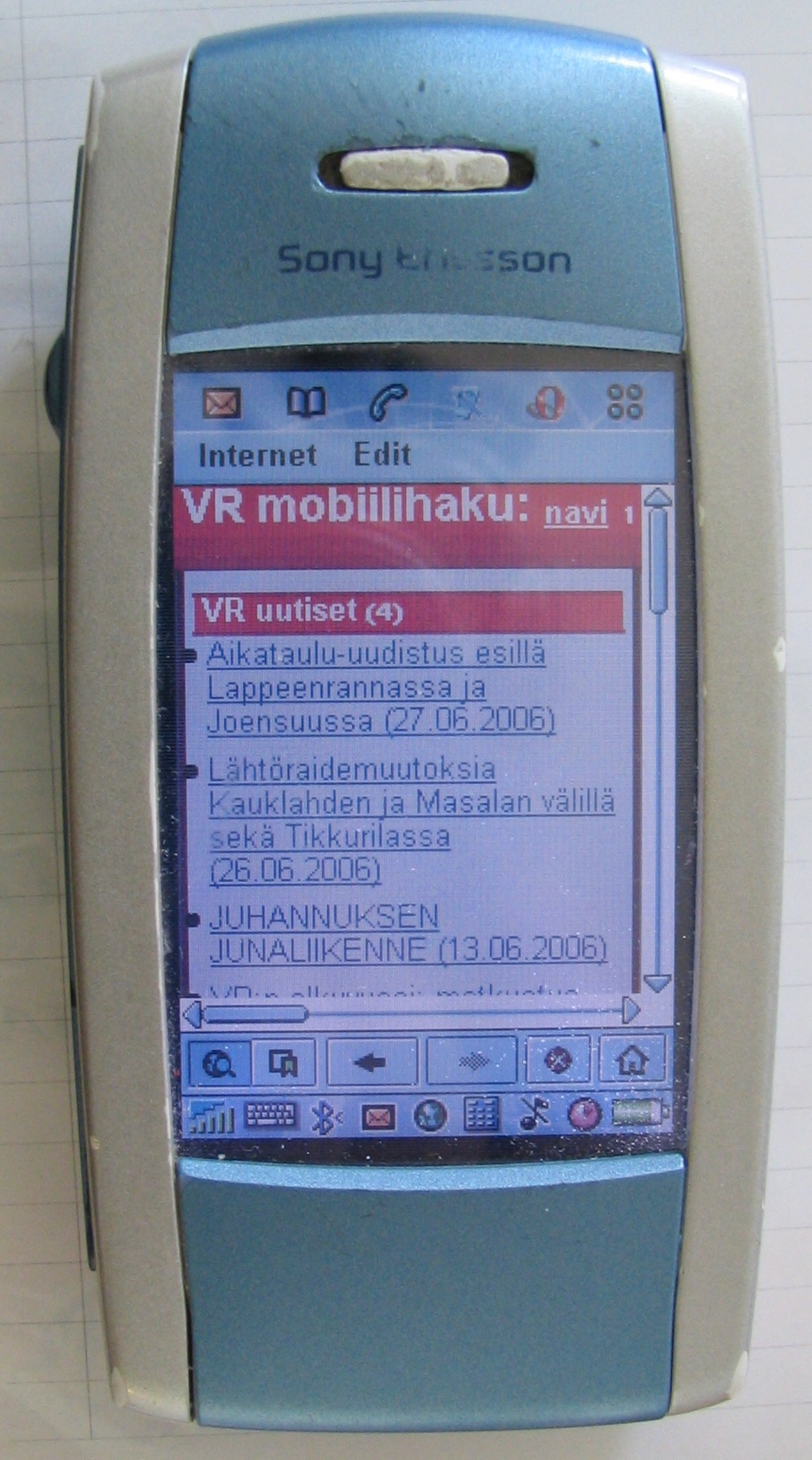
Sony Ericsson P800, the first device running UIQ to ship. In this device, UIQ runs on top of Symbian.

UIQ (formerly known as User Interface Quartz) is a discontinued software platform based upon Symbian OS, created by UIQ Technology AB. It is a graphical user interface layer that provides additional components to the core operating system, to enable the development of feature-rich mobile phones that are open to expanded capabilities through third-party applications.

== History ==
UIQ was the result of 'Quartz', a user interface for pen PDAs that was one of the three provisional interfaces that were designed by Symbian Ltd. The first three Quartz phones never made it to market, including Psion's "Odin" in a joint venture with Motorola, which was cancelled in January 2001, causing Psion's shares to deteriorate. Engineers thereafter created a lighter version of the software which was presented in 2002, and first shipped that year with Sony Ericsson P800.

Sony Ericsson was the main OEM using the UIQ platform in its products. Motorola also developed some products using UIQ, but abandoned the platform in 2004 in favour of Linux, along with its stake in Symbian Ltd. In 2007, Motorola returned to UIQ with the launch of Motorola RIZR Z8. Nokia, which was using the competing Series 60 (later S60) platform, created one UIQ device called Nokia 6708, which is a rebadged BenQ P31, and was only released in the Asia-Pacific region.

Sony Ericsson bought UIQ Technology in November 2006, and the next year, Motorola bought half of it.

After the creation of the Symbian Foundation and its favouring of S60 as their user interface of choice, UIQ's future was uncertain, as it could no longer develop the software for the Symbian operating system. Many Motorola UIQ devices planned for 2009 were cancelled, including Motorola Razr3, codenamed "Ruby".

UIQ Technology filed for bankruptcy in January 2009, which effectively ended the UIQ platform. Sony Ericsson moved on to Windows Mobile and the open source Symbian from the Symbian Foundation, whilst Motorola adopted Google's Android software.

UIQ 3.3 was the last version of the platform, based upon Symbian OS v9.3. Developers that developed on the UIQ 3.x platform had a much better story than with previous releases, since all UIQ 3.x phones were served by a single, core SDK.

== UIQ programming languages ==
Native applications can be written in C++ using the Symbian/UIQ SDK. All UIQ-based phones (2.x and 3.x) also support Java applications.

UIQ phones employ touch screens with a resolution of 208×320 pixels (UIQ 1.x & 2.x) and 240×320 (UIQ 3.x). Depending on the phone, the color depth is 12-bit (4096 colors), 16-bit (65536 colors), 18-bit (262144 colors), and 24-bit (16,777,216 colors) on some newer phones.

For developers, the significant items are:

- Single SDK model - developers targeting core UIQ features can use the UIQ SDK to target any UIQ 3 device. Extensions targeting specific device features (such as WiFi, etc.) are available from phone manufacturers' websites.
- Increased tools support - developers can use whichever tools they are familiar with (DevStudio, Eclipse, Carbide, CodeWarrior, NetBeans). Many of these tools are beginning to support extensive RAD features for both C++ and Java developers. Visual Basic programmers can use NS Basic/Symbian OS.
- High volume, mid-range devices are now possible, to significantly increase the potential customer base.

== List of UIQ 2.x phones ==
- Sony Ericsson
  - Sony Ericsson P800 (UIQ 2.0, UIQ 2.1)
  - Sony Ericsson P900 (UIQ 2.1)
  - Sony Ericsson P910 (UIQ 2.1)
- Motorola
  - Motorola A920 (UIQ 2.0)
  - Motorola A925 (UIQ 2.0)
  - Motorola A1000 (UIQ 2.1)
  - Motorola M1000 (UIQ 2.1)
- Benq
  - BenQ P30 (UIQ 2.0)
  - BenQ P31 (UIQ 2.1)
- Nokia
  - Nokia 6708 (Rebadged BenQ-Siemens P31, UIQ 2.1)
- Arima
  - Arima U300 (UIQ 2.0)
  - Arima U308 (UIQ 2.1)

== List of UIQ 3.x phones ==
The following is a list of smartphones that have been announced/confirmed as running the newer UIQ 3.x platform.

PDA-style design (similar to a handheld computer)

- Sony Ericsson M600/M600i/M608c (UIQ 3.0)
- Sony Ericsson P990/P990i/P990c (UIQ 3.0)
- Sony Ericsson P1/P1i/P1c (UIQ 3.0)
- Sony Ericsson W950/W950i/W958c (UIQ 3.0)
- Sony Ericsson W960/W960i/W960c (UIQ 3.0)

Hybrid PDA/Phone design (Candy-bar phone with Touchscreen Display)

- Sony Ericsson G700 (UIQ 3.0)
- Sony Ericsson G900 (UIQ 3.0)

Slider design

- Motorola RIZR Z8 (UIQ 3.1)
- Motorola RIZR Z10 (UIQ 3.2)

== First phones to use platform versions ==
- The first UIQ v2.0-based phone was Sony Ericsson P800.
- The first phone to use UIQ 3 was Sony Ericsson P990.
- The first phone with UIQ 3.1 was Motorola RIZR Z8.
- The first phone with UIQ 3.2 was Motorola RIZR Z10.

== See also ==
- S60, another Symbian-based platform.
- MOAP, a Symbian-based platform used in NTT DoCoMo's 3G mobile phones.
