= BenQ P30 =

Smartphone model

The BenQ P30 is a 2.5G smartphone from BenQ that uses the UIQ platform based upon Symbian OS.

The phone was released into the marketplace in October 2004, primarily in Far Eastern markets.

== Specifications ==
- User interface: UIQ 2.1
- Operating system: Symbian OS v7.0
- Display: 65 536 colors, 16-bit TFT touch-screen
- Display size: 2.6", 208x320 pixels
- Dimensions: 118 x 52 x 17 mm
- Weight: 150 g
- Standby time: 120 hours
- Talk time: 5 hours
- Memory card: SD / MMC
- Network: Triband 900/1800/1900 MHz
- GPRS class 10 for wireless data services

== Features ==
- Digital camera with VGA resolution
- Multimedia: MP3 and MPEG4 audio and video
- Web: WAP2.0 browser
- Messaging: Email, MMS, SMS
- PIM functionality: Contacts, Calendar, Notes, etc.
- Connectivity: USB, Infrared and Bluetooth
- Handwriting input i-Tap
- Document viewer
- Voice recognition
- Photo album
- Built-in handsfree
- Conference call
- Open development environment: Java MIDP 2.0
