= Sony Ericsson P910 =

Mobile phone model

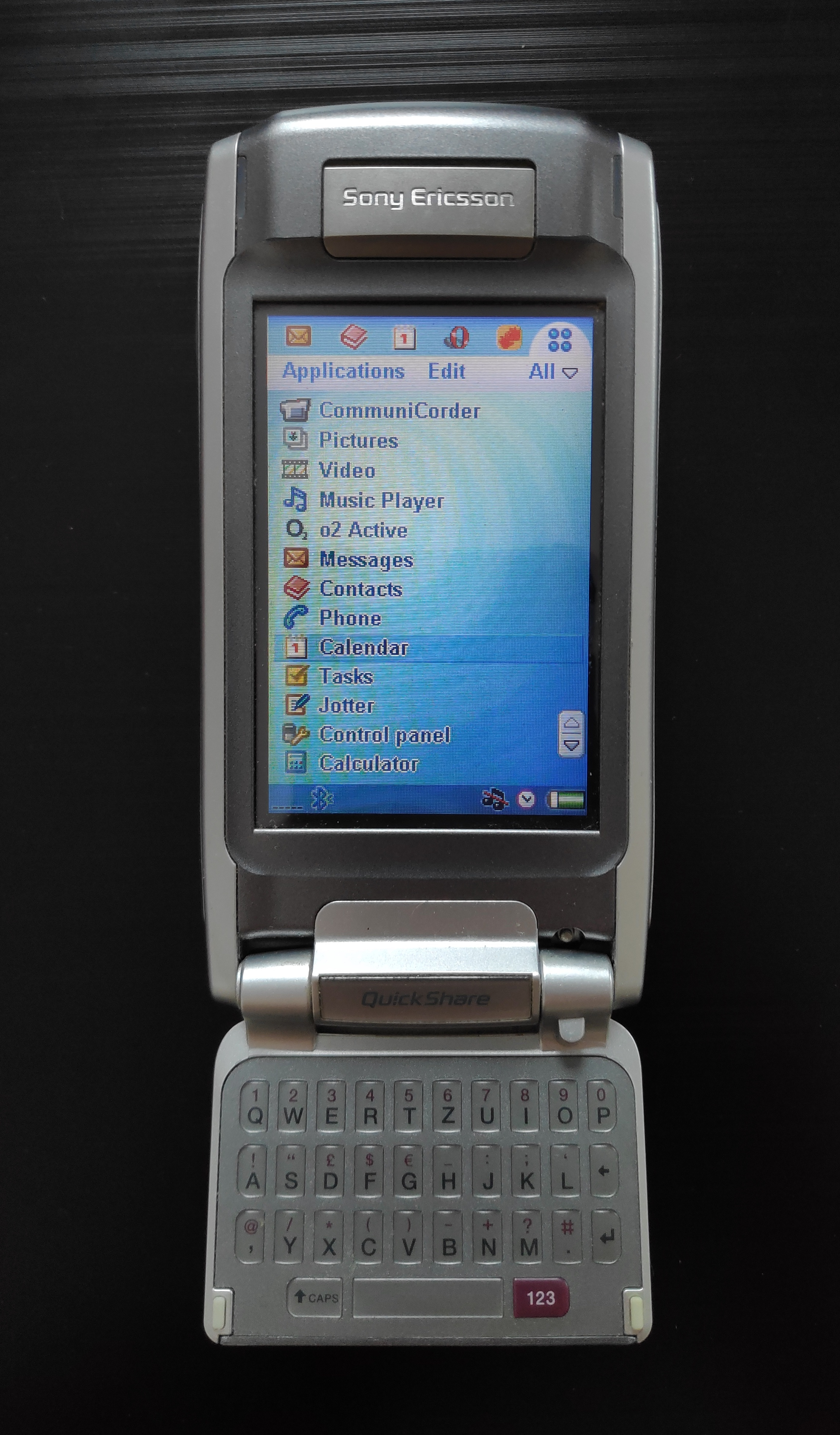
- Manufacturer: Sony Ericsson
- Availability by region: 3Q, 2004
- Predecessor: Sony Ericsson P900
- Successor: Sony Ericsson P990, Sony Ericsson P1
- Compatible networks: GPRS, HSCSD
- Dimensions: 115×58×26 mm (4.5×2.3×1.0 in)
- Weight: 150 g (5 oz)
- Operating system: Symbian OS with UIQ
- CPU: ARM9 at 156 MHz
- Memory: 64 MB RAM
- Removable storage: Memory Stick PRO Duo (up to 2GB)
- Battery: 1260 mAh
- Rear camera: 0.3 MP, VGA
- Display: 240 x 320 TFT 262,144 colors
- Connectivity: Bluetooth, IrDA, GSM
- Data inputs: Keypad / touchscreen / jog dial / keyboard

The Sony Ericsson P910 is a mobile phone by Sony Ericsson introduced in 2004 and the successor of the Sony Ericsson P900. The P910 has a full QWERTY keyboard on the back of the flip (the flip can also be removed completely, allowing for a 'traditional' PDA form-factor). The biggest change from the P900 to the P910 is that the P910 supports Memory Stick PRO Duo and the phone's internal memory has been upped from 16 MB to 64 MB. Although Memory Stick PRO Duo comes in larger capacities, the maximum supported by the P910i is 2 GB. It is powered by an ARM9 processor clocked at 156 MHz and runs the Symbian OS with the UIQ graphical user interface. The touchscreen displays 262,144 colours (an 18-bit colour depth), as opposed to the P900's 65,536 (16-bit). It comes in three versions:

- P910i (GSM 900/1800/1900)
- P910c (GSM 900/1800/1900 for China mainland)
- P910a (GSM 850/1800/1900 for North America and Latin America)

One of the key aspects of the P910 is its ability to input text via several methods: multi-tap and T9 text input using the numerical keypad, hand-writing recognition with the pre-installed Jot-Pro software and touchscreen, virtual keyboard on screen and the new QWERTY keyboard on the inside of the flip.

Other enhancements (compared to the P900) include support for HTML browsing, a new numerical keypad with larger keys and a slightly changed outer casing.

Its closest competitors are the palmOne Treo 650, and the Nokia 9500 Communicator. Other competitors include several PDA-phones powered by Windows and manufactured by Taiwan-based HTC.

Sony Ericsson released the successor to the P910, the P990, in 2006.

== Specifications ==
- 208x320 screen resolution
- 262,144 color touchscreen LCD
- UIQ 2.1 based on Symbian OS 7
- 115 x 57 x 24 mm in size
- GSM P910i (Europe): 900 MHz/1800 MHz/1900 MHz
- GSM P910a (North America): 850 MHz/1800 MHz/1900 MHz

== Standard Functions and Programs ==
=== Business ===
- Calendar
- Contacts
- Jotter
- Messages
- Pdf+ reader
- Phone
- Quicksheet
- Quickword
- Tasks

=== Tools ===
- Calculator
- Control Panel
- Demo
- File Manager
- GPRS Data Log
- Remote Sync
- Sound Recorder
- Storage Wizard
- Time
