= Sony Ericsson P990 =

Mobile phone model

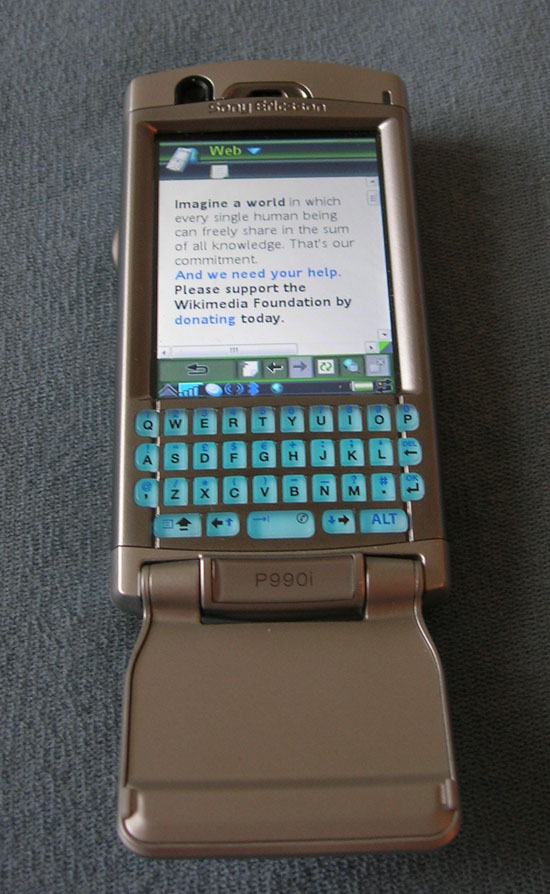
- Manufacturer: Sony Ericsson
- Availability by region: Late July (limited) and August (full retail) 2006
- Predecessor: Sony Ericsson P910
- Successor: Sony Ericsson P1
- Compatible networks: UMTS, GSM
- Operating system: UIQ 3 / Symbian OS v9.1
- Removable storage: Memory Stick Pro Duo
- Rear camera: 2-megapixel with autofocus (rear camera) and QVGA@15fps video recording
- Front camera: VGA camera (front)
- Display: 240 x 320 TFT 262,114 colors
- Connectivity: 802.11b, Bluetooth, IrDA, USB
- Data inputs: Keypad / touchscreen
- Codename: Hermione

The Sony Ericsson P990 is a mobile phone and the successor of the Sony Ericsson P910. The phone uses the UIQ 3 software platform, which is based on Symbian OS 9.1. During development, the phone was codenamed Hermione, after the Harry Potter character of the same name. It was introduced on 11 October 2005, but had a long delayed market release only in August 2006.

The P990 has a numeric keypad that flips open to reveal a full QWERTY keyboard below the display on the phone itself. This is a change from the P910, where the keyboard is on the flip. The flip itself can be attached or detached using the screw and screwdriver found in the box. The phone is a UMTS (3G) and tri-band GSM phone supporting video calls through its front VGA camera. The touchscreen displays 262,114 colours (18-bit colour depth) with a resolution of 240x320 pixels. It also comes with a 2.0 megapixel camera featuring autofocus and an FM/RDS radio. The P990 runs the Nexperia PNX4008 ARM9 208 MHz processor from Philips, which also includes a PowerVR MBX GPU. The screen, despite having a smaller length (2.8 inch) than its predecessors, is actually larger in area because of the increased resolution. The phone also improves over the P910 by including support for Wi-Fi, allowing users to connect to 802.11b wireless networks. Users can browse the Web using the built-in Opera browser. Additional features include RSS feeds, online video streaming, Java ME support, and handwriting recognition.

== See also ==
- List of Sony Ericsson products
- List of UIQ 3 Phones
