= Sony Ericsson M600 =

3G mobile phone

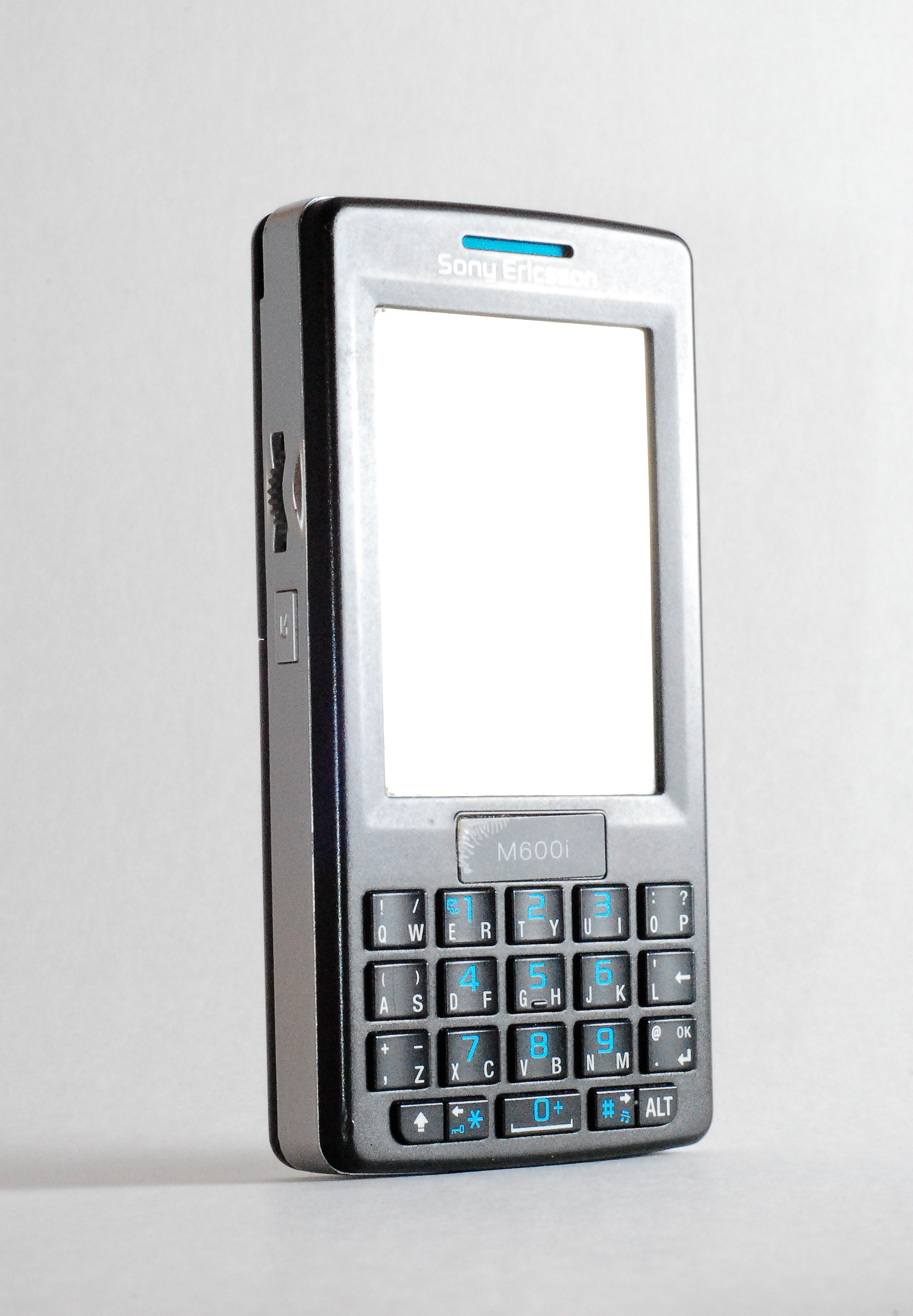
- Manufacturer: Sony Ericsson
- Availability by region: Q2 2006
- Dimensions: 105 x 54 x 15 (4.1 x 0.6 x 2.1 inches)
- Weight: 112 g (4 oz)
- Operating system: UIQ 3.0 / Symbian OS v9.1
- CPU: 32-bit ARM9 based @ 208 MHz
- Memory: 60 MB
- Removable storage: Memory Stick Micro ("M2")
- Battery: 900 mAh Li-Polymer 3.6 Volt
- Rear camera: no
- Display: 240x320 (QVGA) illuminated TFT, 262,000 colors
- Data inputs: Touchscreen

Sony Ericsson M600 (sold as M600i model in some markets and originally labelled M608c in other markets) is a 3G mobile phone based upon the UIQ 3 platform (which is built upon Symbian OS 9.1). It was announced on February 6, 2006 and is the first and only product of the M series of handsets from Sony Ericsson (aside from the Sony Ericsson Aspen).

== About ==
The M600 is designed as a business tool and its features reflect this role. The M600 supports push email, document editing and PC synchronisation amongst other features. Notably the M600 does not have an integrated camera, which is a positive attribute for those working in environments where cameras are not permitted.

The phone uses the UIQ 3 software platform, which is based upon Symbian OS 9.1. The M600 has a new special type of full QWERTY keyboard below the display, on the phone itself. The touchscreen displays 262,144 colours (18-bit colour depth) with a resolution of 240x320 pixels at 2.6 inches long in diagonal. The M600 runs the Nexperia PNX4008 ARM9 208 MHz processor from Philips and has 64MB RAM and 128MB Flash ROM. This processor also includes a PowerVR MBX GPU for hardware-accelerated 3D graphics.

It is notable that the Sony Ericsson P1 has its form factor based on this model.

== Specifications ==
- Colour: White, Black
- Display: 262K Colour touchscreen display (240x320 pixels)
- User interface: UIQ 3.0
- Operating system: Symbian OS v9.1
- Networks: GSM 900, GSM 1800, GSM 1900, UMTS 2100
- Performance: Talk Time - UMTS: 2.5hr / GSM: 7.5hr, Standby Time - UMTS: 250hr / GSM: 340hr

== Criticisms ==
=== Lack of long term commitment by Sony Ericsson ===
The M600 is marked "EOL" (End of Life) less than two years after introduction by Sony Ericsson and therefore is considered a finalized product and will not receive any further firmware updates despite numerous bugs being reported by M600i users.

=== Problems for Mac users ===
Connectivity has been an ongoing problem with the UIQ3 suite of phones from Sony Ericsson and the Mac OS X iSync utility that Mac users use to synchronise a mobile phone with the computer. As of February 2008 there are still widespread problems reported with these phones for Mac users.

== See also ==
- List of Sony Ericsson products
- UIQ
