= Samsung SGH-E900 =

Mobile phone by Samsung

Samsung E900
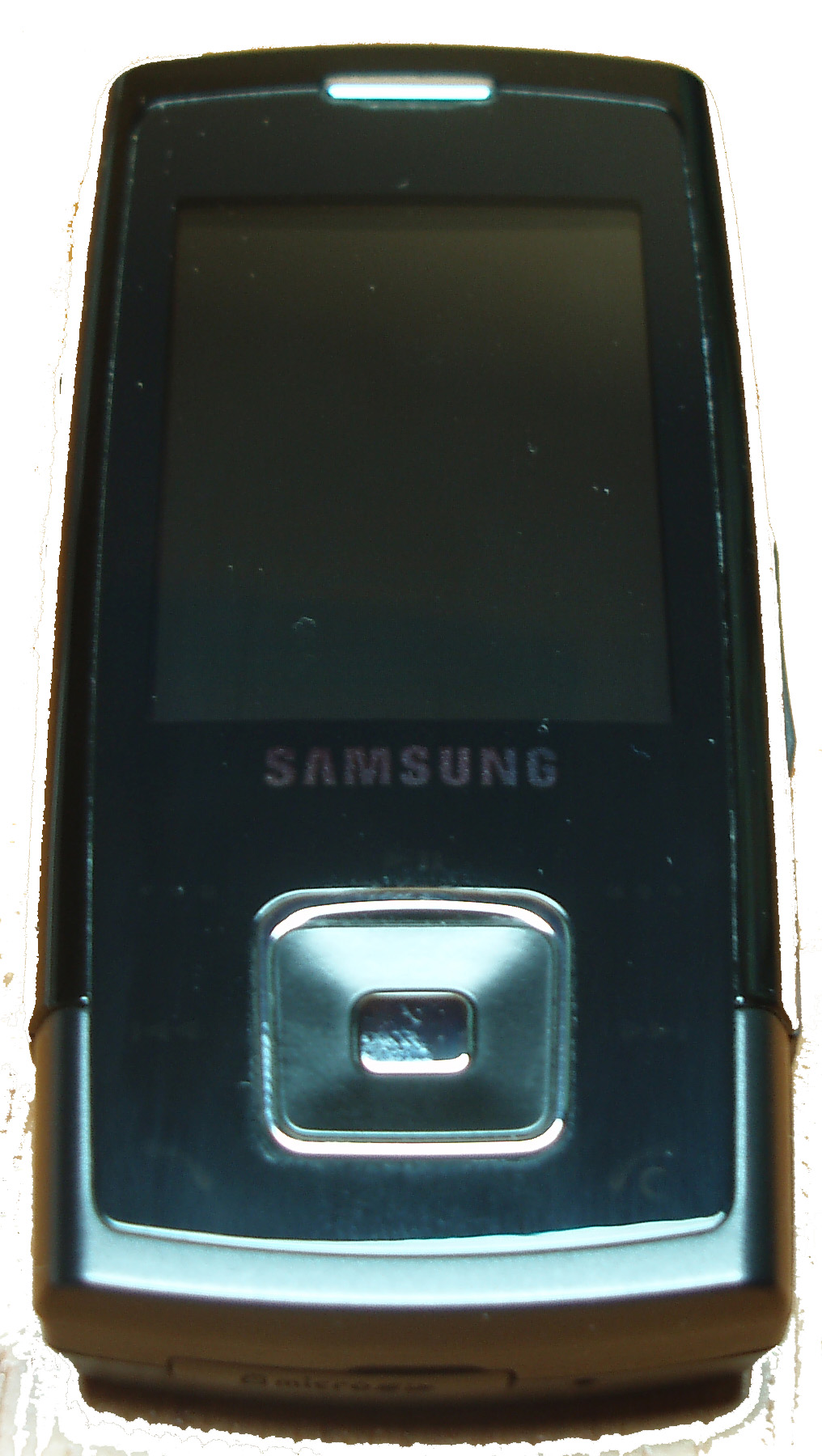
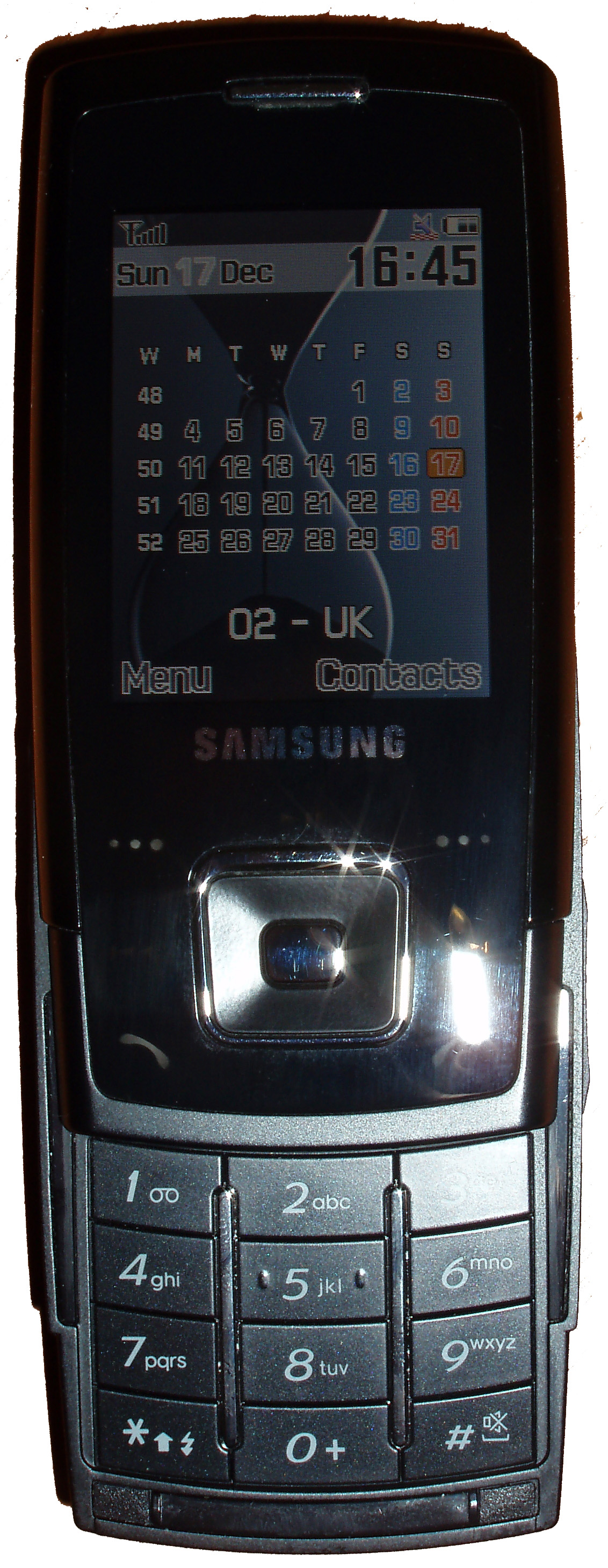
- Manufacturer: Samsung Electronics
- Availability by region: March 2006
- Compatible networks: Tri-Band GSM, GPRS (900/1800/1900MHz), EDGE
- Form factor: Slider
- Dimensions: 3.7 X 1.8 X .6 in (93 x 45 x 16.5 mm)
- Weight: 3.3 oz (94 g)
- Operating system: Samsung's "Agere" Java OS Platform
- Memory: 80 MB
- Removable storage: microSD
- Rear camera: 2 Megapixel
- Display: 2.0" (240x320 pixels) 262K Color TFT LCD
- Sound: Polyphonic (64 channels), MP3
- Connectivity: Bluetooth 1.2, USB 1.1, WAP 2.0, GPRS Class 10

The Samsung E900, introduced in 2006, is a high-end mobile phone and is derived from Samsung's D500-D600-D800 series of slide phones. It is of a slide-up design and has touch-sensitive keys, similar to the LG Chocolate (KG800). It was one of the most popular phones at the time but was discontinued late 2007 when buyers then turned their attention to the Samsung D900i, followed by the Samsung U600, which was the slimmest phone by Samsung with a thickness of 1.09 cm (0.43 in) until the E840 was released.

== Specifications ==
The Samsung E900 contains many technologies that make it one of the most feature-rich phones available in the middle of 2006.

- 2 Megapixel Camera (1600x1200)
- Video Recording CIF 352x288 & Messaging (XviD)
- Music Player (MP3, ACC/ACC+, e-AAC+, WMA formats)
- Bluetooth (with A2DP)/ USB
- Document Viewer for DOC XML and PPT files / TV-output
- Java games - 6 included on the phone but only 2 free
- Text/Photo/Video Caller ID/EMS
- Personal organiser functions
- Talktime: 3.5 hours
- Battery standby: 220 hours
- 80MB built in memory
- Touch pad (capacitive touch sensitive)
- MicroSD Card Expansion
- Built in WAP browser, Powered by NetFront v3.2

This phone was the first phone released by Samsung with the new Black UI & White & White UI. This user interface was created to be more convenient and quickly learnable.

Phone contains Bluetooth, Java ME player and an MP4 and MP3 player.
