= Samsung U700 =

Mobile phone by Samsung

Samsung SGH-U700
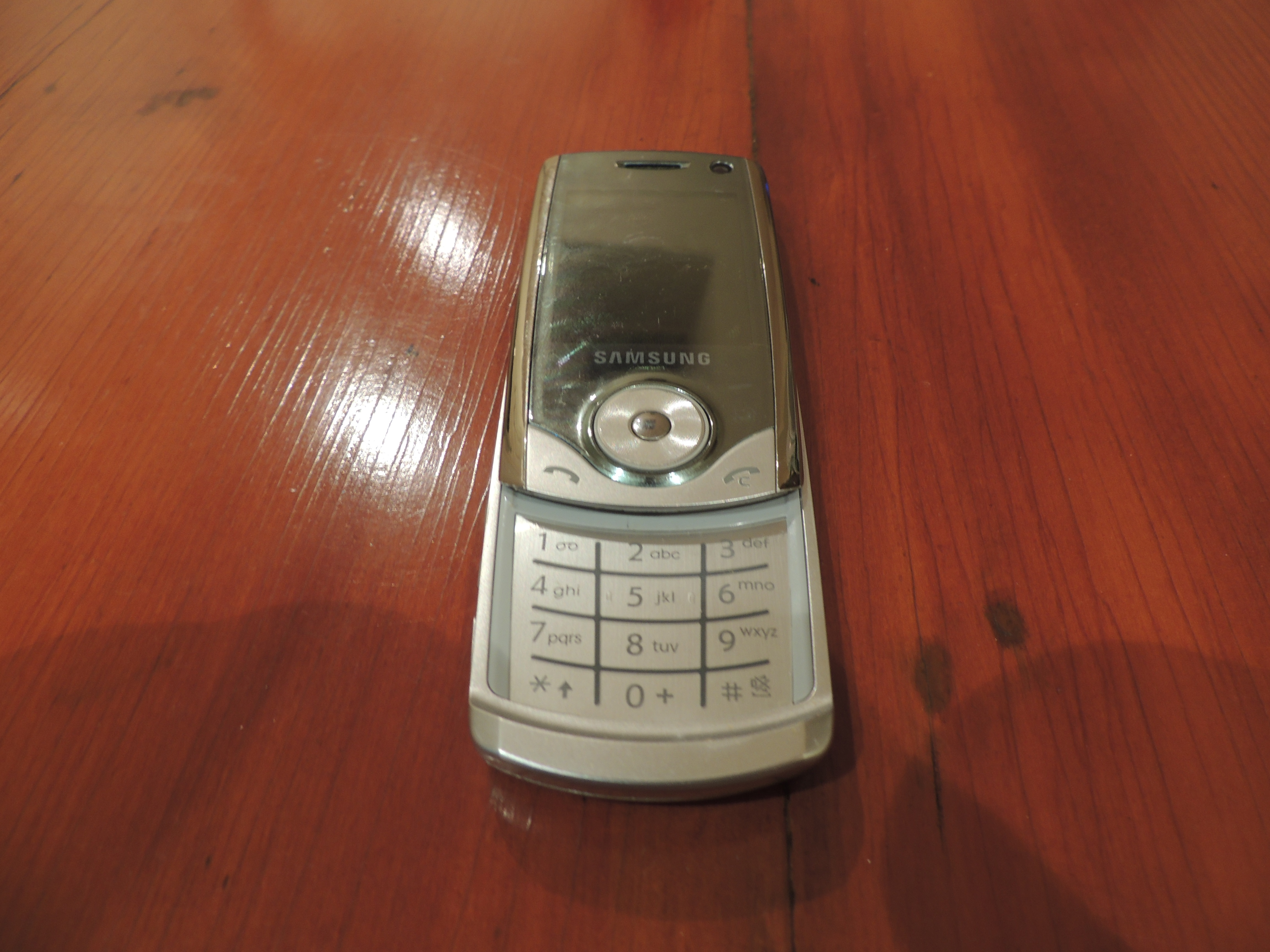
- Manufacturer: Samsung Electronics
- Availability by region: 2007
- Related: Samsung SGH-U600
- Compatible networks: GSM 850/900/1800/1900 + EDGE
- Form factor: Slider
- Dimensions: 4.07 × 2 × 0.5 in (103.5 × 51 × 12.9 mm)
- Weight: 2.93 oz (83 g)
- Memory: 40 MB
- Removable storage: microSD 2 GB
- Rear camera: 3.2 megapixel
- Front camera: None
- Display: 240 × 320 pixels (QVGA)
- Connectivity: GPRS Class 10 (4+1/3+2 slots) 32 - 48 kbit/s, Bluetooth v2.0, USB
- Codename: Alex

The Samsung SGH-U700, also known as the Ultra Edition 12.1, is a mobile telephone produced by Samsung Electronics.

The U700 was awarded "European Mobile Phone 2007-2008" by the European Imaging and Sound Association (EISA). The award for "European Media Phone" was given to Nokia N95.

== Features ==
The phone has features including:

- Quad-band capabilities, allowing it to be used as a mobile phone on all major GSM networks across the globe.
- Built-in hands-free function.
- Built-in Bluetooth wireless technology.
- Custom animated backgrounds (varies with country of sale).
- Memory card slot for optional microSD memory card up to 2 GB (2 GB only with the latest firmware)
- 40 MB internal memory.
- MP3 Ringtones.
- Speakerphone.
- Digital audio player.
- 3.2 megapixel digital camera with many shooting modes and an integrated LED photo/video light (flash), autofocus, and the ability to perform basic image editing functions.
- AVI, XviD video recording: QCIF, 176 × 144 px.
- Java games.
- Alarm clock with three configurable alarms.
- Calendar.
- Calculator.

The slider can be configured to accept and close calls, as well as locking and unlocking the keypad. Settings are available which allow for the phone to stay unlocked even when closed.

== See also ==
- Samsung U600
- Samsung U900 Soul
- Samsung D900
