= Samsung SGH-U900 Soul =

Mobile phone model

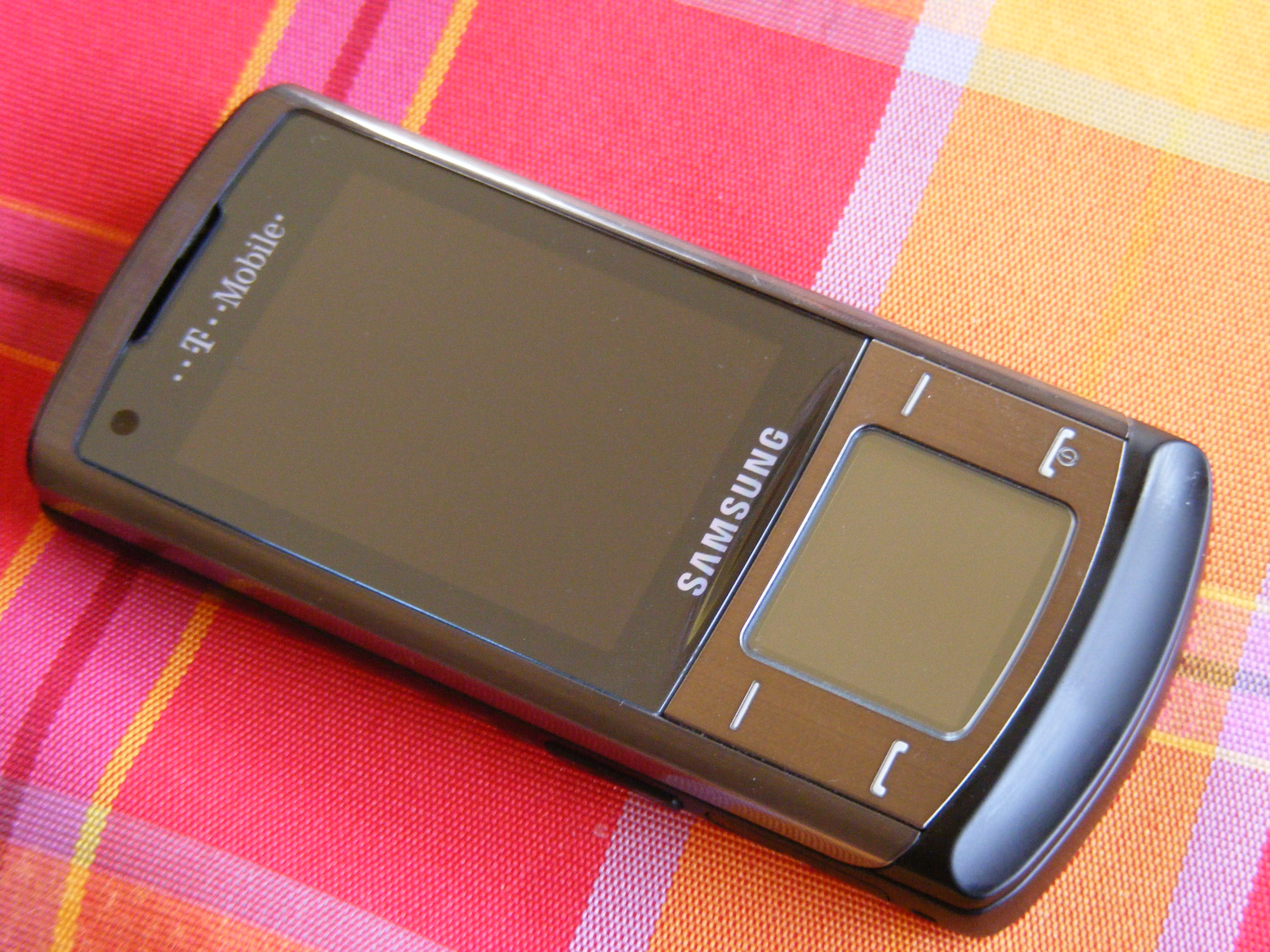
Front of the U900 Soul

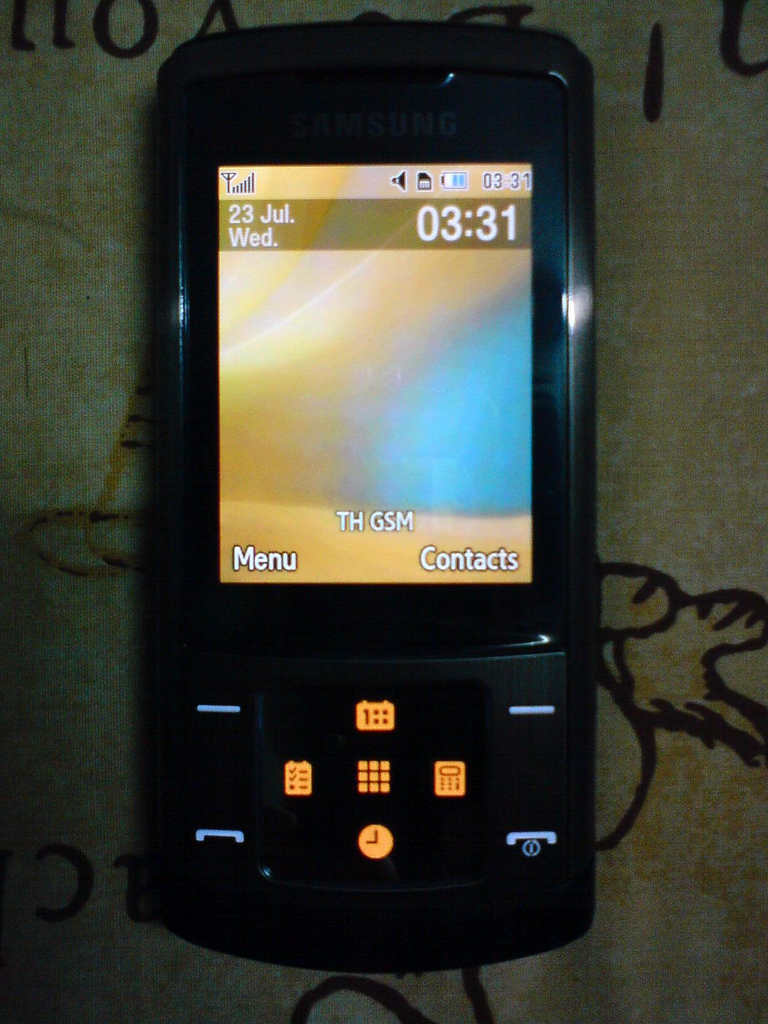
Soul

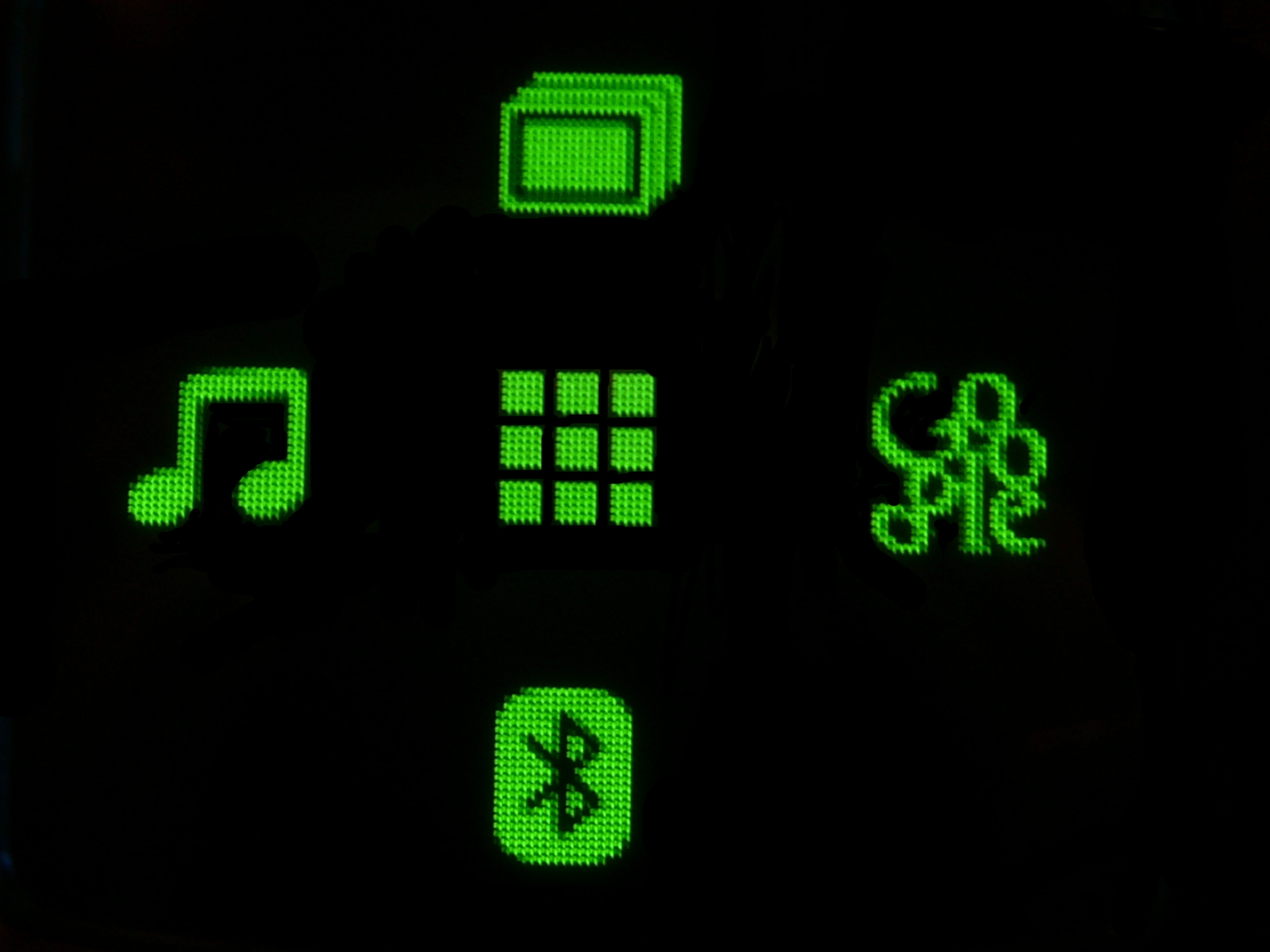
The Soul's front touch buttons

The Samsung SGH-U900 (marketed as the Samsung Soul) is a slider mobile phone from Samsung Telecommunications. It was introduced at Mobile World Congress on 11 February 2008. It is a member of Samsung's fashion-focused "Ultra" line of handsets and the company's flagship at the time.

The Soul initially came in two colors: Platinum Silver and Soul Gray, later also coming in Pink, Silver, Black and Gold. It was made of a metallic body and the slider has spring mechanism. There is a second, touch-sensitive OLED display below the main 2.2-inch display which shows different navigational functions, tailored for the current software operation (as previously appearing on the E950 model). Samsung dubs it as "Magical Touch".

There is a 5-megapixel camera with LED flash that can also take videos at 30 fps in QVGA (320x240) resolution. There is HSDPA support, and it is a "global" 3G phone supporting all major frequencies: GSM 850, GSM 900, GSM 1800, GSM 1900, HSDPA, UMTS 850, UMTS 1900, UMTS 2100. Audio playback makes use of a digital amplifier from Bang & Olufsen, although there is no 3.5 mm headphone jack, relying instead on a proprietary Samsung connector. Despite its flagship status, the Samsung Soul does lack several key features like Wi-Fi, GPS, or smartphone software. These were instead implemented on the Samsung G810, announced at the same time.

The "Soul" name stands for "The Spirit of Ultra" (referring to Samsung Ultra Edition). The U900 Soul name is an extension of the U900 FlipShot, a clamshell/swivel multimedia phone announced for Verizon Wireless in November 2007.

== Reception ==
Publisher S21 said that the camera of the U900 Soul is "very good", but just below the "best" ones namely Nokia N95 and Sony Ericsson K850. The review concluded calling it a "fabulous" phone. Wired called the touch-sensitive navigational pad "one of the coolest, most efficient" touch interfaces they have seen on a handset. TechRadar called the U900 Soul "extremely stylish with a quality camera", but criticized the battery life.

== See also ==
- Samsung U700
- Samsung U600
- Samsung D900
- Samsung G600
- Samsung E950
- Samsung F480 Tocco
- Samsung S8300 UltraTouch
- LG Venus
