= Sony Ericsson Satio =

Smartphone model

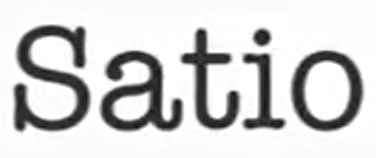

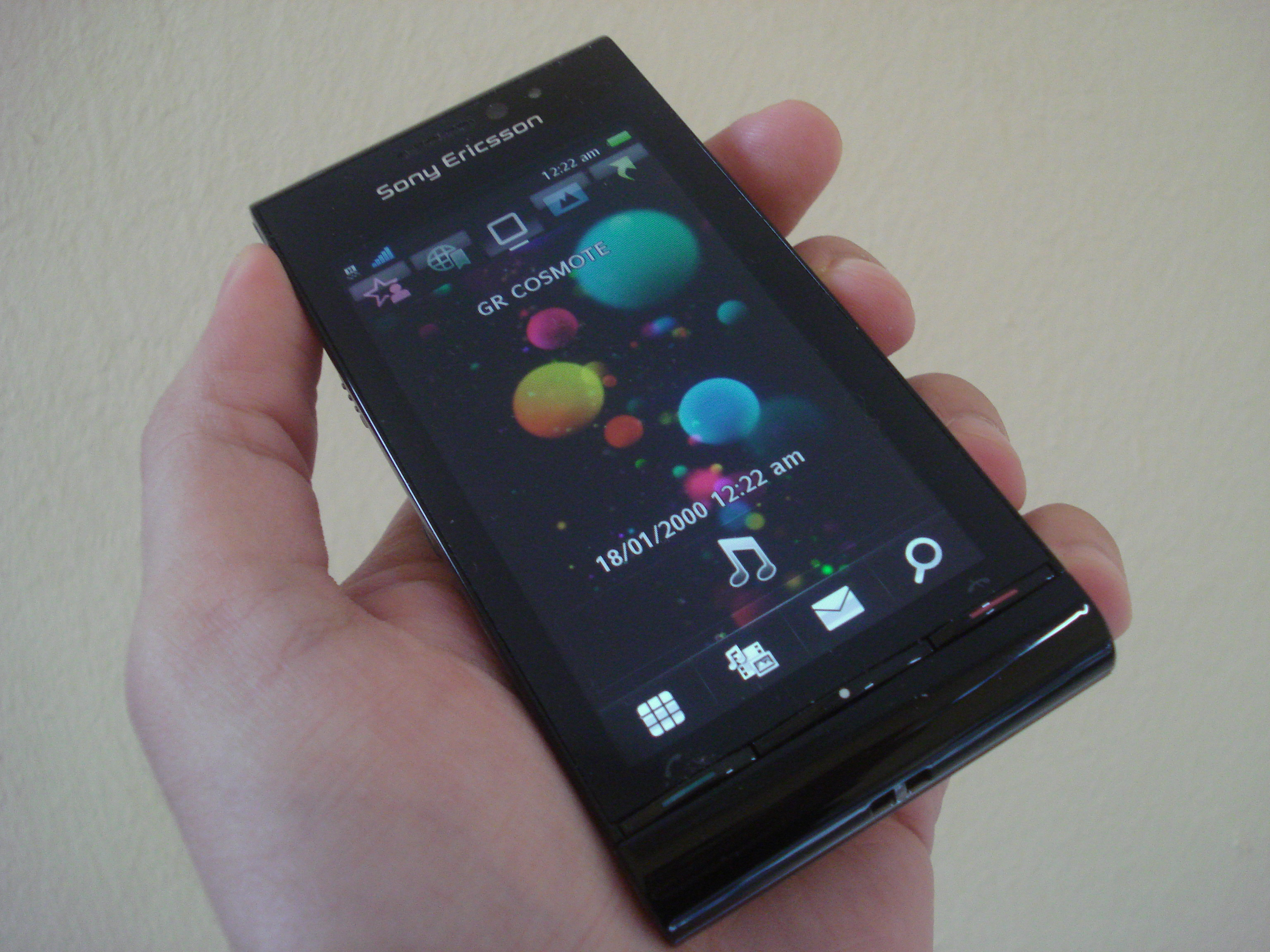
- Sony Ericsson Satio
- Developer: Sony Ericsson
- Manufacturer: Sony Ericsson
- Type: Camera phone
- Series: S-series
- Availability by region: 7 October 2009 (UK), Late 2009 (USA)
- Predecessor: Sony Ericsson G900; Sony Ericsson P1; Sony Ericsson C905
- Successor: Sony Ericsson Vivaz
- Compatible networks: GSM GPRS/EDGE 850/900/1800/1900, UMTS HSDPA 900/2100 (Satio), GSM GPRS/EDGE 850/900/1800/1900 UMTS HSPA 850/1900/2100 (Satio(a))
- Form factor: Touchscreen
- Dimensions: 112 mm × 55 mm × 13 mm (4.41 in × 2.17 in × 0.51 in)
- Weight: 126 g (4.4 oz)
- Operating system: Symbian OS 9.4 running S60 5th edition
- CPU: ARM Cortex-A8 600 MHz processor; 3D Graphics HW Accelerator
- Memory: 256 MB RAM and 128 MB ROM (Internal storage)
- Storage: 128 MB
- Removable storage: microSDHC up to 32 GB, 8 GB included
- SIM: miniSIM
- Battery: Li-Po 1000 mAh
- Charging: Fast port (proprietary) up to 5W (standard charging speed)
- Rear camera: 12.1 MP, 4000 x 3000 pixels, auto-focus, xenon flash, video LED flash
- Front camera: 0.3 Megapixel (VGA)
- Display: TFT touchscreen, 16M colours 3.5 in (89 mm), 360 x 640 pixels
- Connectivity: Wi-Fi (802.11 b/g, DLNA), A-GPS, Bluetooth (v2.0 with A2DP)
- Data inputs: Touchscreen and 3 buttons below screen
- Codename: Kokoro

The Sony Ericsson Satio (U1i) is a smartphone, announced by Sony Ericsson at the Mobile World Congress in Barcelona, Spain on 15 February 2009 as the Idou. It was released on 7 October 2009 in the UK in 3 colour schemes: Black, Silver and Bordeaux (Red).

Succeeding both the Walkman and Cyber-shot, the primarity focus of the phone is the high quality playback of music and video, as well as photography. The camera features a xenon flash, similar to the earlier K800 and K850. On the side of the phone, there is a shutter button, and a button which allows you to switch between still and video modes. Next to this is a rocker switch for zooming in and out. Also on this side is a button for playback of photos or video. The other side of the phone has a sliding lock button and a covered slot for a MicroSD card.

The front of the phone is dominated by a 3.5-inch (89 mm), 16:9 ratio 360x640 TFT resistive touchscreen. There is also a front-facing camera for video calling. At the bottom of the touchscreen are three small buttons: green (left), white (centre), and red (right).

In terms of software, Satio uses the Symbian OS 9.4 operating system, which is created collaboratively under the stewardship of the Symbian Foundation as "Symbian^1". It is Sony Ericsson's first non-UIQ Symbian device, after UIQ's development closed down earlier that year. It uses the PlayNow service, Sony Ericsson's mobile content platform, and is part of the company's new Entertainment Unlimited service. In terms of connectivity, it is Wi-Fi-enabled and has a GPS chip for navigation and location-based services. It also supports full Flash for video playback.

The phone was withdrawn from sale in November 2009 by two major British retailers due to complaints from customers. However, the problem was found only in UK editions of the phone and was probably caused by carrier-specific customizations. The following software update released by Sony Ericsson provided a fix and the phone was back for sale at those two retailers.

Sony Ericsson Satio, then Sony Ericsson Vivaz and finally Sony Ericsson Vivaz pro are the latest additions by Sony Ericsson to the Symbian OS family of phones. Afterwards, they were succeeded by the Sony Xperia line of Android Smartphones.

== Features ==
- 16:9, 3.5 inch widescreen
- 12.1-megapixel camera, intuitive touch focus, Xenon flash and face and smile detection
- Symbian S60 5th Edition Operating System
- Touch navigation

=== Dimensions ===
- 112 x 55 x 13 mm

=== Display ===
- nHD TFT resistive touchscreen
- 16 million colours
- 360 x 640 pixels
- 3.5"

=== Memory ===
- Internal storage: 73 MB
- RAM: 256 MB
- Micro SD memory card support

=== Connectivity ===
- aGPS
- Bluetooth technology
- Modem
- PC Synchronization
- USB support
- USB mass storage
- Wi-Fi 802.11 b/g, DLNA
- Google Maps
- PictBridge
- TV Out
- Data Transfer
- Sync

=== Camera ===
- 12.1 MP (can use 2 MP, 5 MP, 9 MP, 10 MP and 12 MP modes)
- Digital zoom - up to 16x
- 4000 × 3000 pixels
- Auto-focus
- Video recording (640x480 @ 30 frame/s, WVGA 864x480 @ 24 frame/s via software update)
- Video light
- Xenon flash
- Video blogging
- Geo-Tagging
- BestPic
- Face detection
- Image stabilizer
- Photo fix
- Picture blogging
- Red-eye reduction
- Smile detection

=== Internet ===
- Web browser - WebKit
- Web feeds
- Opera Mobile 12 for Symbian OS
- Opera Mini 7 for Symbian OS
- SkyFire
- Skype

=== Entertainment ===
- 3D games
- Java
- Media
- Radio - FM radio
- Video Clip
- Video streaming
- YouTube

=== Messaging ===
- Email
- Exchange ActiveSync
- Instant messaging
- Picture messaging (MMS)
- Predictive text input
- Sound recorder
- Text messaging (SMS)

=== Communication ===
- Polyphonic ringtones
- Speakerphone
- Vibrating Alert
- Video calling

=== Design ===
- Auto rotate
- Navigation key
- Picture wallpaper

=== Organiser ===
- Alarm clock
- Calculator
- Calendar
- Document editors
- Document readers
- Flight mode
- Handwriting recognition
- Notes
- Phone book
- Touchscreen

=== CPU ===
- Texas Instruments OMAP3430 Cortex-A8 @ 600 MHz
- 3D Accelerator PowerVR SGX530

== See also ==
- OMAP
- Samsung M8910 Pixon12
- Nokia N8
- Nokia N97
- Nokia X6-00
- Symbian S60
- Sony Ericsson C905
