= D800 =

D800 may refer to:

- British Rail Class 43 (Warship Class), a locomotive
- Dell Latitude D800, a laptop computer
- Nikon D800, a full-frame digital single-lens reflex camera
- Samsung D800, slider phone
