= D600 =

D600 may refer to:

- Nikon D600, a full-frame digital single-lens reflex camera
- Samsung SGH-D600, a mobile phone
- Dell Latitude D600, a laptop computer
