= Samsung S8300 UltraTouch =

Smartphone model from Samsung

Samsung S8300
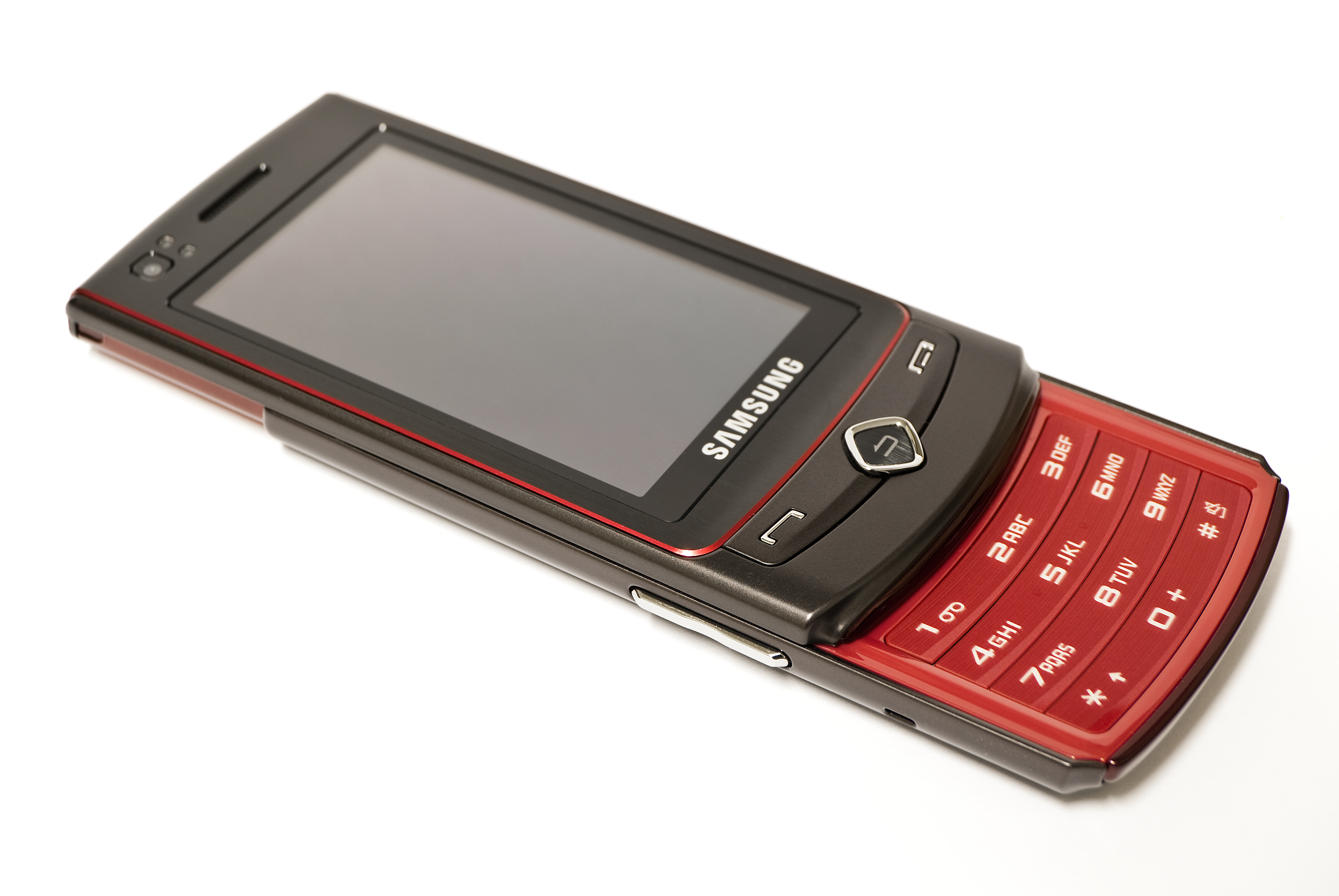
- Manufacturer: Samsung Electronics
- Availability by region: March 2009
- Predecessor: Samsung SGH-F480
- Successor: Samsung Galaxy S
- Compatible networks: AGPS, HSDPA (3.5G), Quad band GSM / GPRS / EDGE
- Form factor: Touchscreen / Slider
- Dimensions: 110×52×12.7 mm (4.33×2.05×0.50 in)
- Weight: 122 g (4 oz)
- Operating system: Samsung Proprietary TouchWiz UI with Widget support
- CPU: 500MHz Qualcomm MSM6281 processor.
- Storage: 80 MB internal/ Up to 16 GB MicroSD
- Removable storage: MicroSD (TransFlash)
- Battery: Li-Ion (880 mAh)
- Rear camera: 8 Megapixels (Back) with 720x480@30fps Video Recording
- Front camera: 3G Video Calling (Front)
- Display: 240x400 px (rotatable), 2.8 in, AMOLED Touch Screen
- Connectivity: USB 2.0 (MicroUSB), Bluetooth 2.1 with A2DP
- Data inputs: Touch Screen, Capacitive touchscreen, Buttons

The Samsung S8300 (marketed as UltraTOUCH, also as Tocco Ultra) is a smartphone model from Samsung Telecommunications, released in April 2009. At the time of release, it was Samsung's flagship high-end mobile phone. The phone includes features such as; an AMOLED touch-screen display, a slide-down keypad, an 8.0-megapixel camera with video recording (auto-focus, face detection and smile-shot), an integrated music player, and AGPS navigation. It was the last phone in the Samsung Ultra Edition series. The 2010 Samsung Galaxy S became its successor a year later.

== Variants ==
S8300V: A variant released specifically for the Vodafone network.

S8300C: A Chinese model branded under the Anycall name.

S8300H: A Hong Kong model also under the Anycall brand. Player Ultra: The marketing name used in France.

== See also ==
- Samsung F480 Tocco
- Samsung U900 Soul
- Samsung i8510 Innov8
- Samsung M8800 Pixon
