= E950 =

E950 may refer to:

- Acesulfame potassium, a calorie-free artificial sweetener
- Nikon Coolpix 950, a model of digital camera produced by Nikon
- Samsung SGH-E950, a model of mobile phone produced by Samsung and introduced in 2007
