= Samsung Ultra Edition =

Series of mobile phones manufactured by Samsung

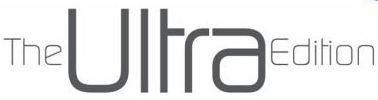
Ultra Edition logo

Samsung Ultra Edition is a former series of mobile phones from Samsung Electronics that were designed to be extremely slim and minimalistic. The first range was introduced in June 2006 which included the X820, dubbed the "world's thinnest" at just 6.9 millimetres thickness. The second range came in February 2007 including the new "world's thinnest" U100 model at 5.9 mm thickness, a figure that remains very rare in handsets as of 2020. To date, the slimmest mobile phones are Oppo R5 and R5s introduced 2014 with 4.9 mm thickness. The "Ultra Edition" names represent the respective handset's width in millimetres. It was discontinued in January 2010, as some of its features were integrated into the Samsung Galaxy family with the launch of the Samsung Galaxy S series.

== List of devices ==
Ultra Edition (2006)

- Samsung D830 (Ultra Edition 9.9, 2006)
- Samsung D900 (Ultra Edition 12.9, 2006)
- Samsung X820 (Ultra Edition 6.9, 2006)
- Samsung Z370 (Ultra Edition 8.4, 2006)
- Samsung Z620 (Ultra Edition 11.8, 2006)
- Samsung Z720 (Ultra Edition 13.8, 2006)
- Samsung Z630 (Ultra Edition 12.9, 2007)

Ultra Edition II (2007)

- Samsung U100 (Ultra Edition 5.9)
- Samsung U300 (Ultra Edition 9.6)
- Samsung U600 (Ultra Edition 10.9)
- Samsung U700 (Ultra Edition 12.1)

Spirit of Ultra (Soul) (2008)

- Samsung G400 Soul
- Samsung U800 Soulb
- Samsung U900 Soul
- Samsung S7330 Soul

Other phones with an Ultra moniker

- Samsung D840 (Ultra Edition, 2006)
- Samsung F300 (Ultra Music, 2006)
- Samsung F500 (Ultra Video, 2006)
- Samsung i600 (Ultra Messaging, 2006)
- Samsung F520 (Ultra Smart, never released)
- Samsung F700 (Ultra Smart, 2007)
- Samsung S7220 (Ultra b / UltraCLASSIC, 2009)
- Samsung S7350 (Ultra s, 2009)
- Samsung S8300 (Ultra Touch / Tocco, 2009)

== See also ==
- Motorola RAZR V3
- Motorola SLVR
- Samsung U900 Soul
