= Samsung SGH-G810 =

Mobile phone released in 2008

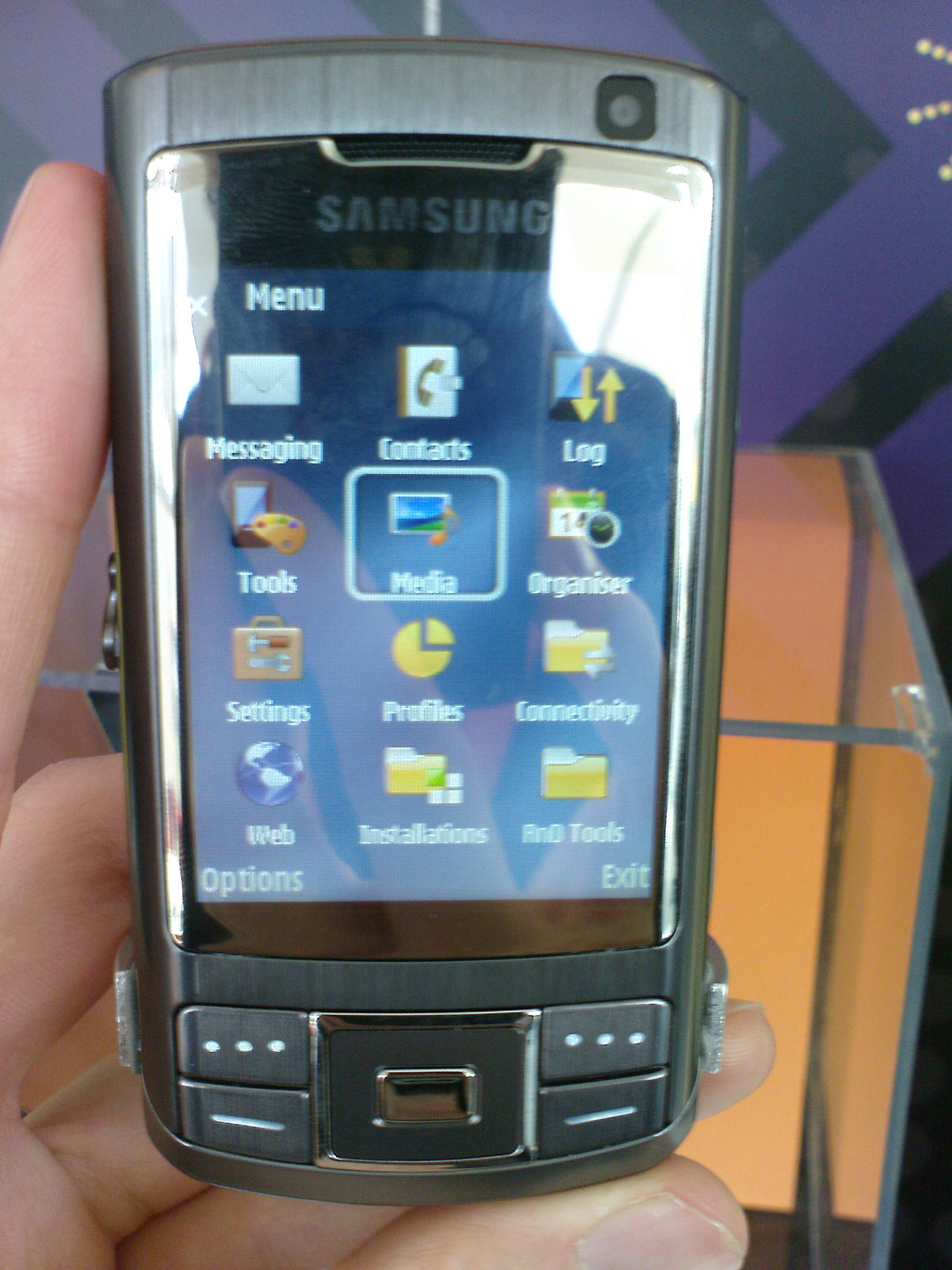
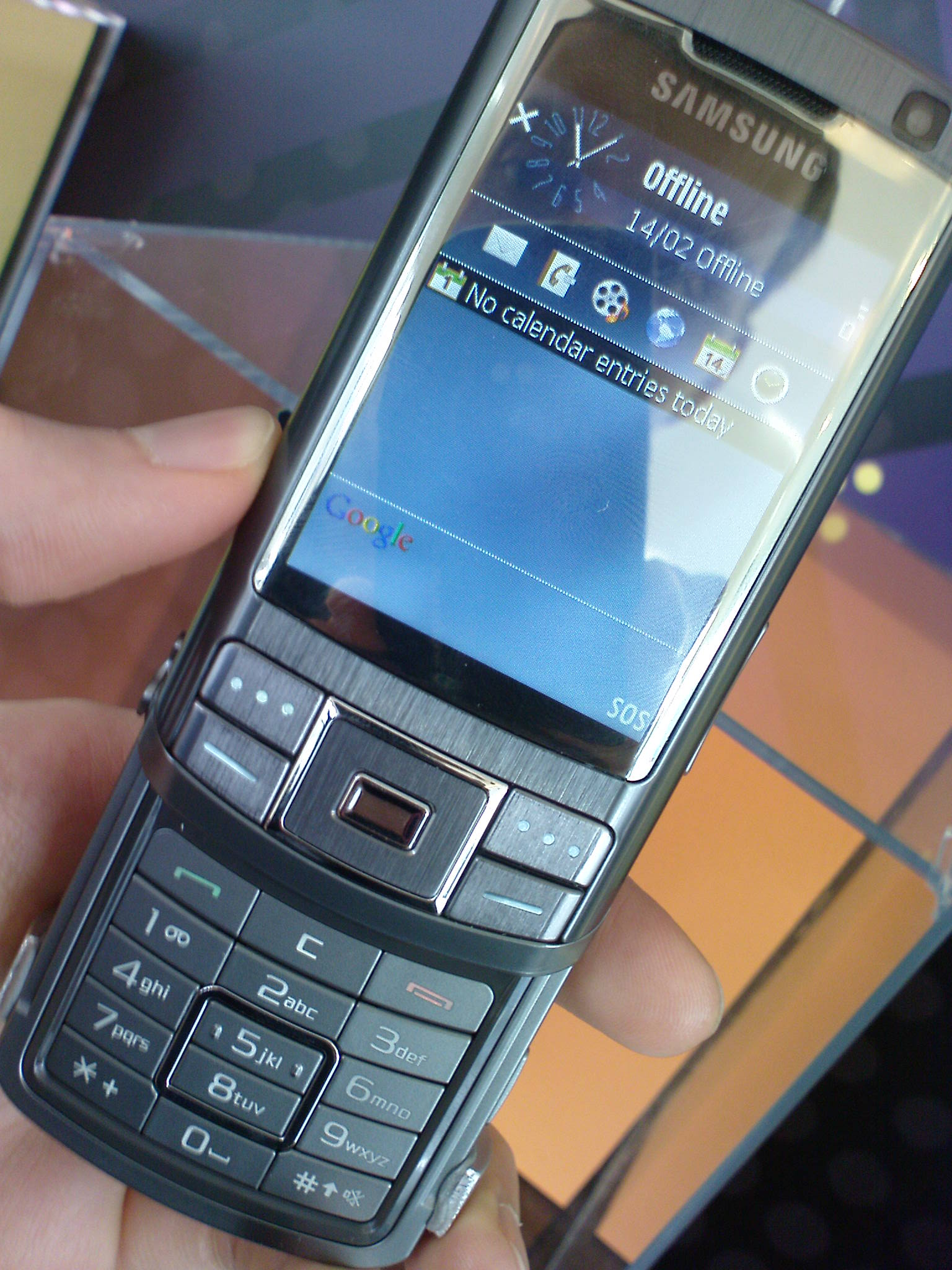
- Manufacturer: Samsung Electronics
- Series: G series, Symbian
- Availability by region: March 2008, Europe, Asia Pacific, China
- Predecessor: Samsung SGH-G800
- Successor: Samsung i8510 Innov8
- Compatible networks: GSM 900, GSM 1800, GSM 1900, UMTS-HSDPA 2100
- Form factor: Slide 3GPP / MPEG4
- Operating system: Symbian OS v9.2, Series 60 rel. 3.0
- CPU: ARM 11
- Memory: 150 MB
- Storage: HDSD micro, SD micro
- Rear camera: 5.0-megapixel 3x optical, xenon flash, VGA vdeo recording
- Connectivity: GPS + Geo tags, Wi-Fi 802.11 b/g, Bluetooth 2.0, USB 2.0, SMS, MMS, Email, FM radio, TV out connection(NTSC / PAL)
- Data inputs: Keypad, Bluetooth

The Samsung G810 is a Symbian OS mobile phone developed and released by Samsung Telecommunications. It was announced at Mobile World Congress on 11 February 2008.

The handset succeeds the previous G-model, the G800, incorporating the same 5-megapixel camera with Xenon flash, 3x Optical Zoom, and 3.5G capability, whilst adding Wi-Fi and GPS capabilities and running on the S60 (3rd Edition) Symbian platform. With these features in a slider-package, the G810 was aimed at rivaling Nokia's N95. It has an all-metal casing.

The G810 comes with QuickOffice pre-installed which ables to edit and create Microsoft Office 2003 file formats and read PDF files. Its web browser is WebKit based and is able to use WAP 2.0/xHTML, HTML, RSS feeds and video streaming.

It was succeeded by the Samsung i8510 Innov8.

== See also ==
- Nokia N95
- Nokia N82
- Sony Ericsson C905
- Sony Ericsson C902
- Sony Ericsson K850
- Samsung F480 Tocco
- Samsung U900 Soul
