= Sony Ericsson Vivaz =

Mobile phone model

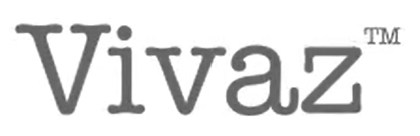

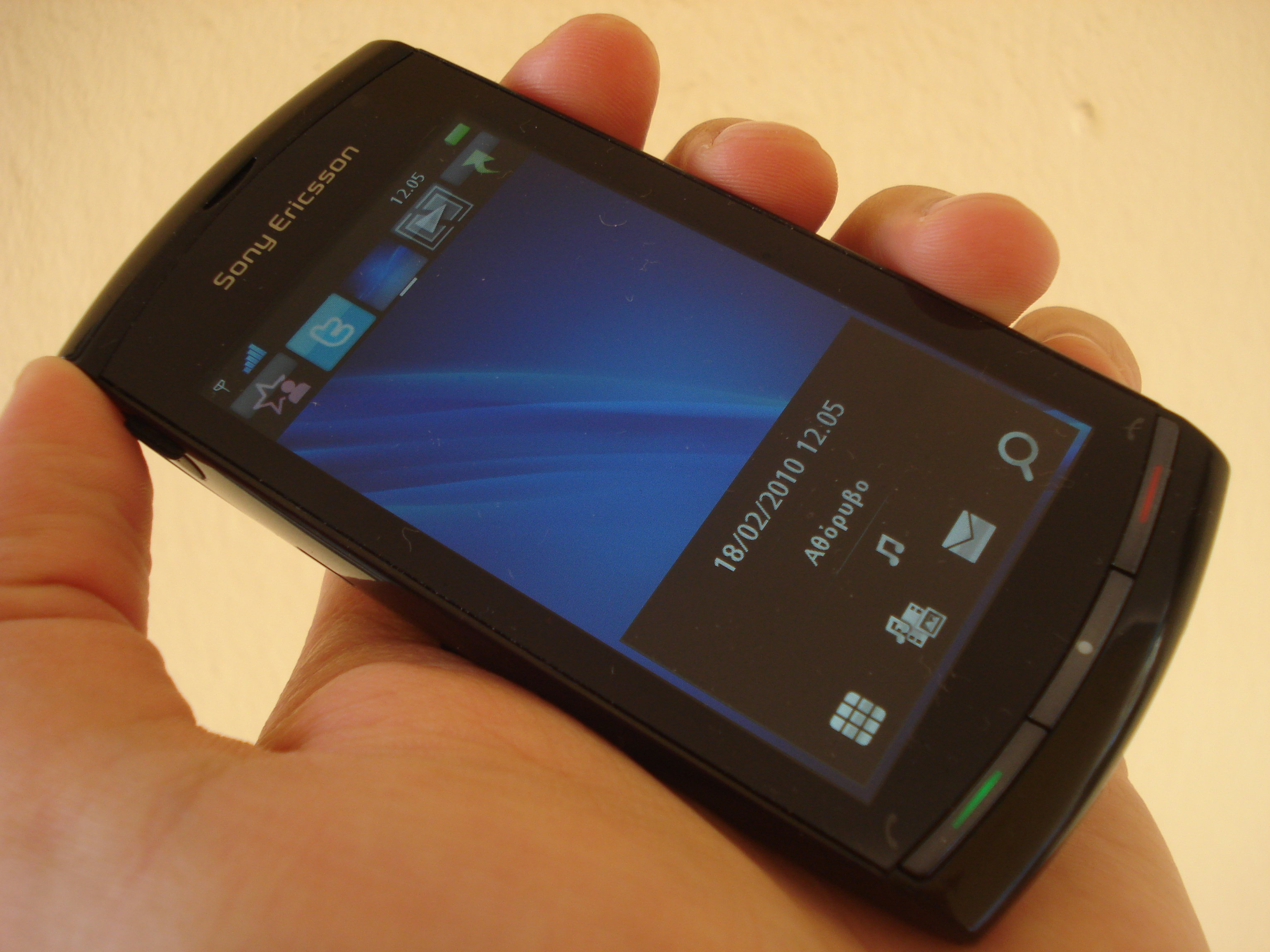
- Developer: Sony Ericsson
- Manufacturer: Sony Ericsson
- Type: Smartphone
- First released: March 5, 2010; 16 years ago
- Availability by region: March 5, 2010
- Predecessor: Sony Ericsson Satio
- Successor: Sony Ericsson Xperia neo
- Related: Sony Ericsson Satio
- Compatible networks: GSM GPRS/EDGE 850/900/1800/1900, UMTS HSDPA/HSUPA 900/2100
- Form factor: Touchscreen
- Dimensions: 107×51.7×12.5 mm (4.21×2.04×0.49 in)
- Weight: 97 g (3 oz)
- Operating system: Symbian OS 9.4 running S60 5th edition
- CPU: ARM Cortex-A8 720 MHz processor; 3D Graphics HW Accelerator
- Memory: 256 MB
- Storage: 8 GB
- Removable storage: Micro SDHC up to 32 GB
- SIM: miniSIM
- Battery: Li-Po 1200 mAh
- Charging: miniUSB charging up to 5W (standard)
- Rear camera: 8 MP, 3264 x 2448 pixels, auto-focus, LED flash (there is no flash facility with this phone)
- Front camera: None
- Display: TFT touchscreen, 16M colors 3.2-inch (81 mm), 360 x 640 pixels
- Connectivity: Wi-Fi (802.11 b/g, DLNA), A-GPS, Bluetooth (v2.0 with A2DP)
- Data inputs: Touchscreen, 3 buttons below screen, Key Lock button, Volume button
- Codename: Kurara

The Sony Ericsson Vivaz (U5i) is a smartphone, announced by Sony Ericsson on 21 January 2010. It was released on 5 March 2010 in the color schemes Moon Silver, Cosmic Black, Galaxy Blue and Venus Ruby.

The phone is compact and has its focus spread to multiple functions, photography, HD video recording, music playback and internet connectivity. The camera is located on the back, together with the LED flashlight. It is not covered by any special slider. The side of the phone features four buttons on one side: one for activating the camera functionality and starting/stopping video recording, one for taking pictures once the camera is enabled, and the remaining two in the form of a rocker for volume control / camera zoom depending on the active mode. The other side has a covered Micro-B USB slot for charging and connecting to a computer.

The front of the phone is dominated by the 3.2-inch (81 mm) resistive touchscreen, with a 360x640 resolution. Below the touchscreen are three buttons, green (left), white (center) and red (right).

Software-wise, the Vivaz uses the Symbian operating system (S60 series 5th Edition). It also uses the PlayNow service, Sony Ericsson's mobile content platform. In addition to the usual GPRS/UMTS/EDGE connectivity, the Vivaz also has Wi-Fi (b and g standards), Bluetooth and A-GPS.

Since June 2010, its variant, the Sony Ericsson Vivaz Pro (U8i) is also available which is a similar phone to Vivaz, but sports a slide-out QWERTY keyboard and a 5-megapixel camera.

The Vivaz, the Vivaz pro and the Sony Ericsson Satio are the last Sony Ericsson phones to run Symbian. After that, all Sony Ericsson smartphones run Android under the Xperia brand.

== Sony Ericsson Vivaz Pro ==
The Sony Ericsson Vivaz Pro has a few differences from the Vivaz, such as a downsized 5-megapixel camera with HD video recording, a slide-out QWERTY keyboard and a larger-size device (109 x 52 x 15 mm, 117g). Other than those differences, both devices are very similar.

== See also ==
- OMAP
