= Samsung SGH-X820 =

Mobile phone model

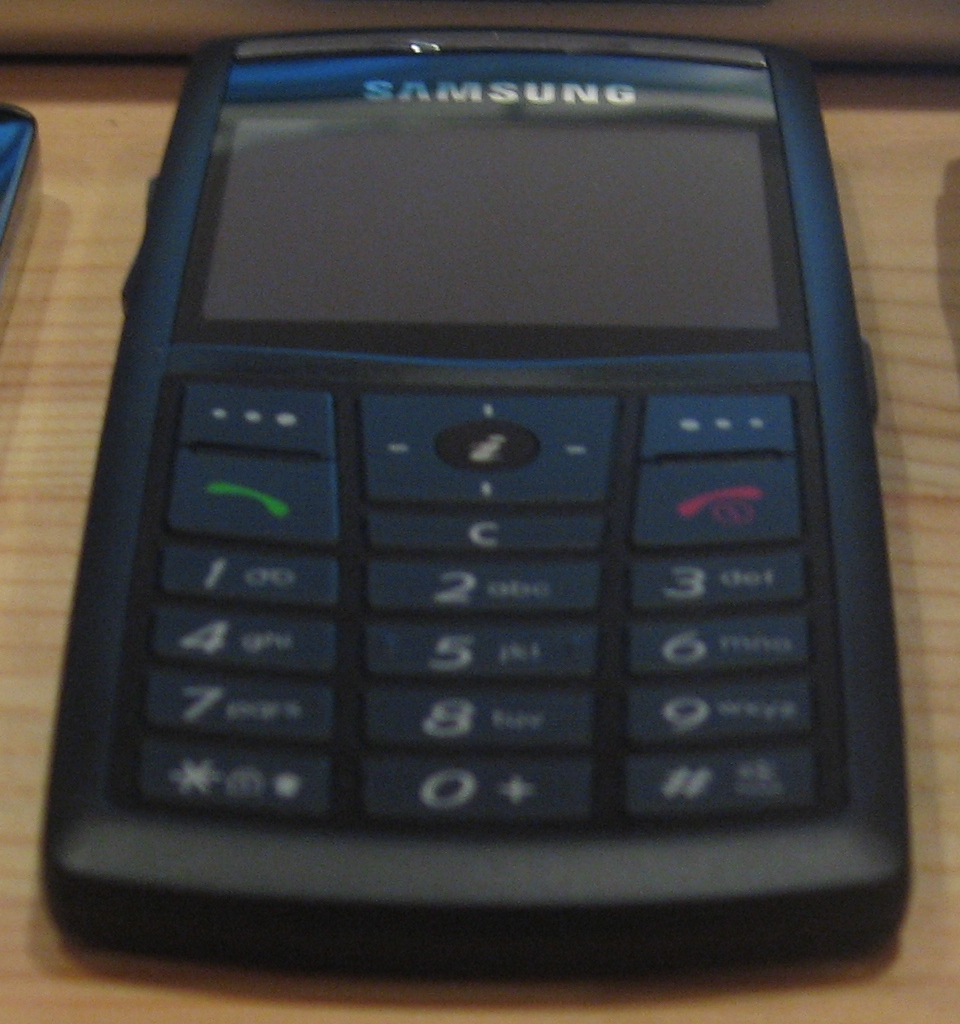
- Manufacturer: Samsung Electronics
- Availability by region: Q3 2006
- Compatible networks: GSM 900/1800/1900 MHz; GPRS Class 10 (4+1/3+2 slots), 32–48 kbit/s; EDGE Class 10; 236.8 kbit/s
- Form factor: Candybar
- Dimensions: 113 × 50 × 6.9 mm 4.4 × 1.9 × 0.27 inches
- Weight: 69 g (2.4 oz)
- Memory: 1000-contact phonebook, caller groups
- Storage: internal, 80 MB
- Battery: 4–6½ hours talk time, 10 days standby
- Rear camera: 2 megapixels, Video: 352×288 px, 15 fps
- Display: 1.8", 220×176 px (QCIF+) TFT LCD, 18-bit color
- Connectivity: Bluetooth 1.2; USB, TV-out (both through a proprietary slot)
- Data inputs: Keypad, dedicated buttons
- Other: SAR 1.19 W/kg

Samsung SGH-X820, also known as Ultra Edition 6.9, is a mobile phone created by Samsung and announced in Q3 2006, as part of the Samsung Ultra Edition range.

Samsung marketed the device as "the world's slimmest mobile phone", and as a competitor to the Motorola SLVR L7. The X820 surpassed Samsung D830, released that same year, which Samsung previously marketed as "the world's slimmest".

The carrier-unlocked U.S. price on late July 2006 was $449.00.

== Hardware ==
The X820 features a 2-inch-diameter and 262,000-color LCD screen with a 220×176-pixel resolution in landscape screen layout instead of the usual portrait screen layout of other phones. The phone uses GPRS and EDGE for mobile Internet, and contains Bluetooth v1.2 for close range wireless connectivity.

The device holds a built-in, roughly 2-megapixel digital camera, thus taking pictures with a maximum resolution of 1600×1200 pixels. The camera is in the top part of the phone, clearly visible where the phone is a bit thicker. Video recording is at a resolution of 352×288 pixels (CIF).

One of the early complaints was that this phone does not have a memory expansion slot; the device only has 80 MB of built-in memory.

The major deficiency turned out to be the phone's case design, which was weak enough to allow the device to break into two parts with little effort. For many users, this fault would not manifest itself until after extensive use.

== Successors ==
After the release of X820, the world's slimmest mobile phone record has since been surpassed by Samsung's Ultra Edition II 5.9mm (U100). Samsung later created a slimmer phone called the Samsung U108.
