= LG Renoir (KC910) =

Cell phone model

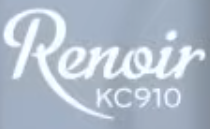
Logo

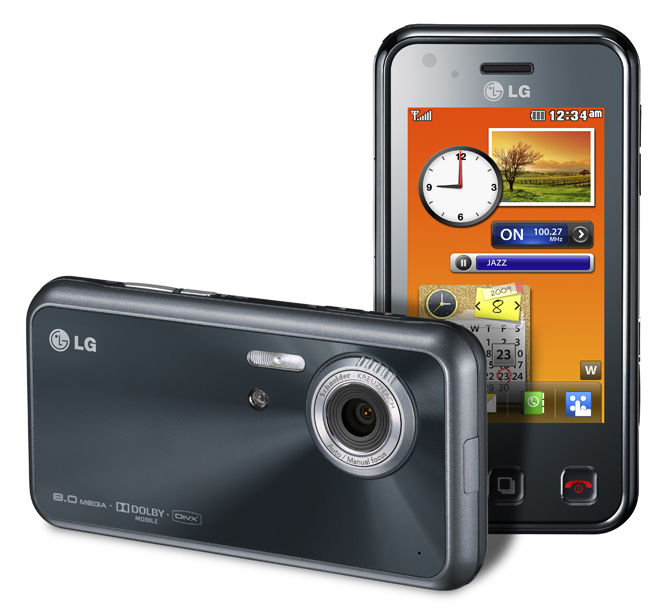
The Renoir

The LG KC910 Renoir is a high-end feature phone released by LG Electronics. The LG Renoir was the world's first full touchscreen 8-megapixel camera phone. It debuted on 2 October 2008 as the successor of the LG Viewty. Like the Viewty is incorporates xenon flash with Schneider Kreuznach optics.

Named after Pierre-Auguste Renoir, the LG Renoir adds several new capabilities over the Viewty, including GPS support, Wi-Fi support, an accelerometer, and Dolby Mobile audio support. Originally released in black, a pink coloured version was released in 2009.

== See also ==
- Samsung i8510 Innov8
- Sony Ericsson C905
- Nokia 5800 XpressMusic
- LG Cookie (KP500)
- LG Arena (KM900)
