= Sony Ericsson C905 =

Mobile phone model

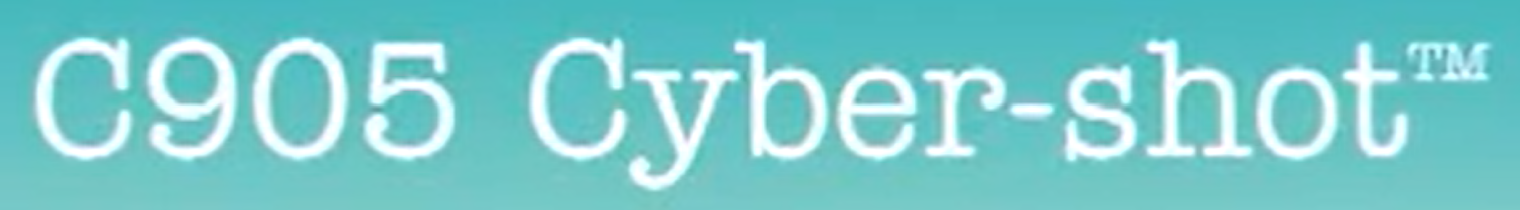

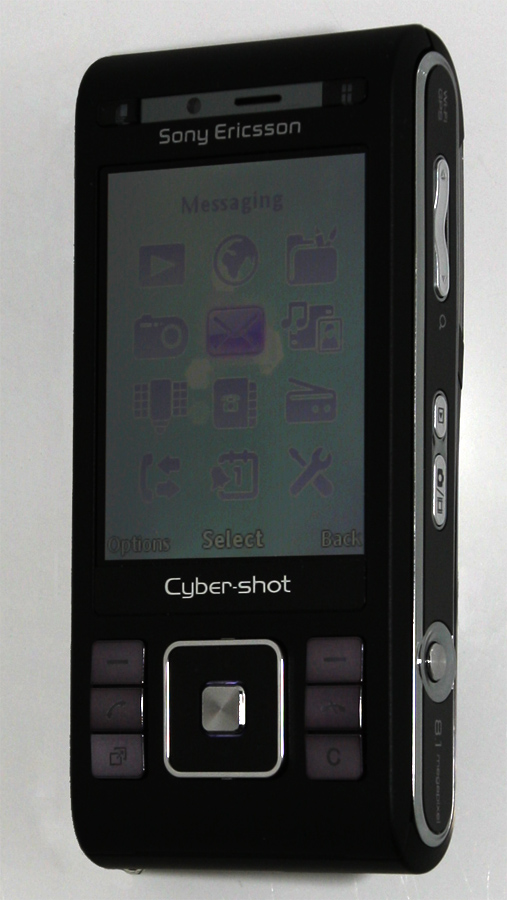
- Developer: Sony Ericsson
- Manufacturer: Sony Ericsson
- Type: Camera phone
- Series: Cyber-Shot series
- First released: October 2008; 17 years ago
- Predecessor: Sony Ericsson K850
- Successor: Sony Ericsson Satio
- Related: Sony Ericsson C510
- Compatible networks: GSM 900/850/1800/1900 and UMTS and HSDPA and EDGE
- Form factor: Slider
- Dimensions: 4.1 × 1.9 × 0.7 in. 104.0 × 49.0 × 18.0 mm
- Weight: 4.8 oz 136.0 g
- Operating system: Sony Ericsson’s proprietary OS
- Memory: 160 MB Internal, Memory Stick Micro (M2)
- Storage: 160 MB
- SIM: miniSIM
- Battery: BST-38 930mAh Li-Poly battery (user-replaceable)
- Charging: Fast Port (proprietary) charging up to 5W
- Rear camera: 8.1 megapixel with AF, geotagging and face recognition
- Front camera: None
- Display: 240x320 pixels (QVGA), 2.4", 262,144 (6-bit) color TFT LCD
- Connectivity: HSDPA, Wi-Fi b/g, 3G, USB 2.0, Bluetooth 2.0
- Data inputs: Keypad

The Sony Ericsson C905 is a high-end mobile phone in Sony Ericsson's 'C' (Cyber-shot) range, which, along with the low-end 'S' (Snapshot) range cameras, supplants the earlier 'K' range of camera phones. It is the flagship model in Sony Ericsson's range for 2008 and it was released on 22 October 2008. It's the first 8-megapixel camera phone to be released outside Korea, while adding the Assisted GPS (A-GPS) and Wi-Fi function. It is also the first Sony Ericsson mobile phone to support the DLNA sharing network as well as the first Cyber-shot phone to also be released for AT&T.

== Features ==
=== Screen ===
- 2.4", 240×320 pixels (QVGA), 262,144 (18-bit) color TFT LCD

=== Camera ===
- 8.1 megapixel CMOS (3264×2448, 7.99 effective megapixels)
- Autofocus lens
- Xenon flash, 3-LED videolight, focus assist lamp, self-portrait mirror
- Image stabilizer
- Face detection auto focus up to 3 faces
- Smile Shutter (newly added, users can update it using the update service option)
- Auto Rotate
- BestPic
- 16× digital zoom
- Video recording: QVGA (320×240) @30fps
- Dedicated camera still/record/review key
- Dual Function D-Pad
- Mechanical lens cover
- PhotoAlbum
- PictBridge

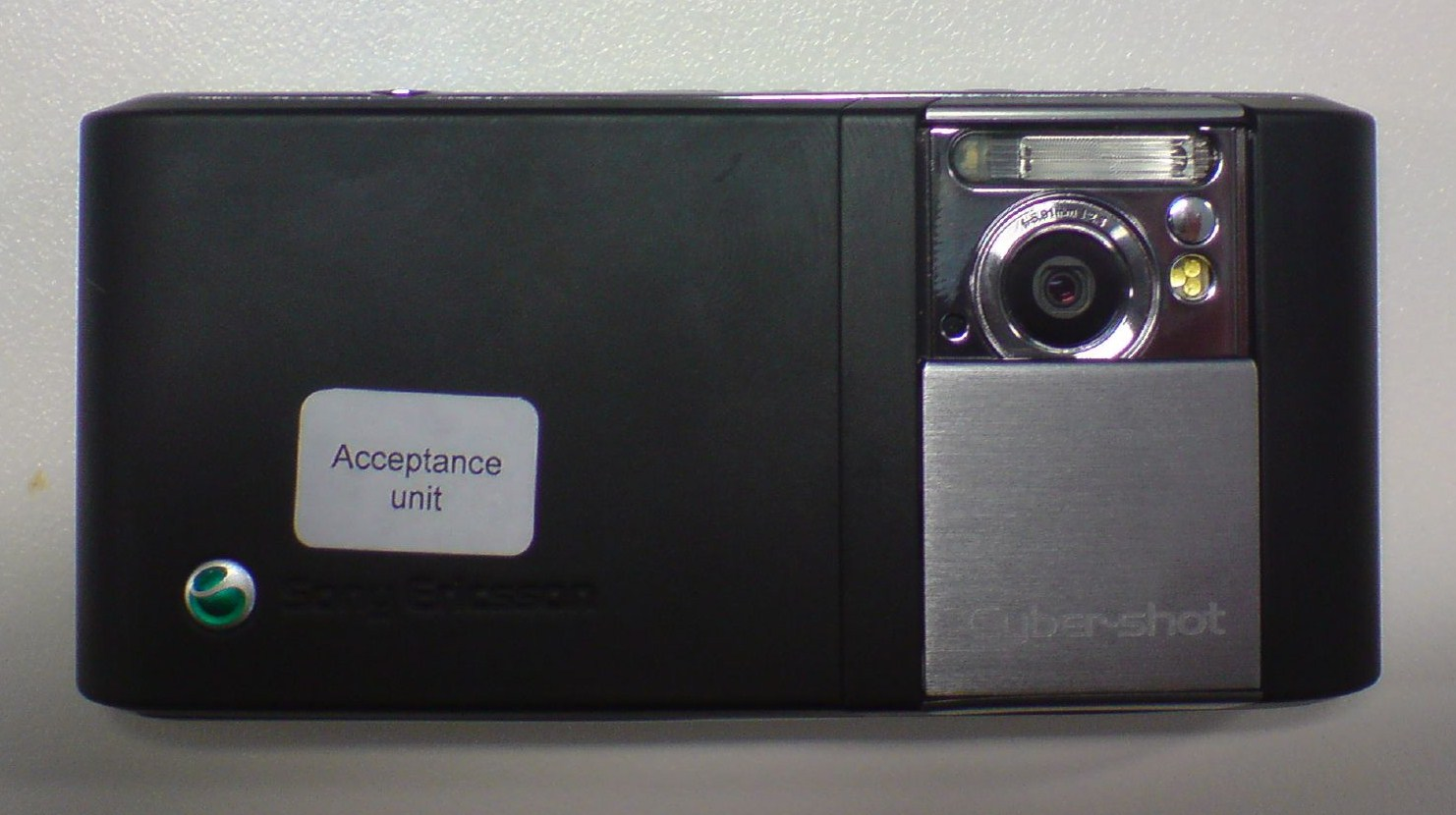
C905 camera

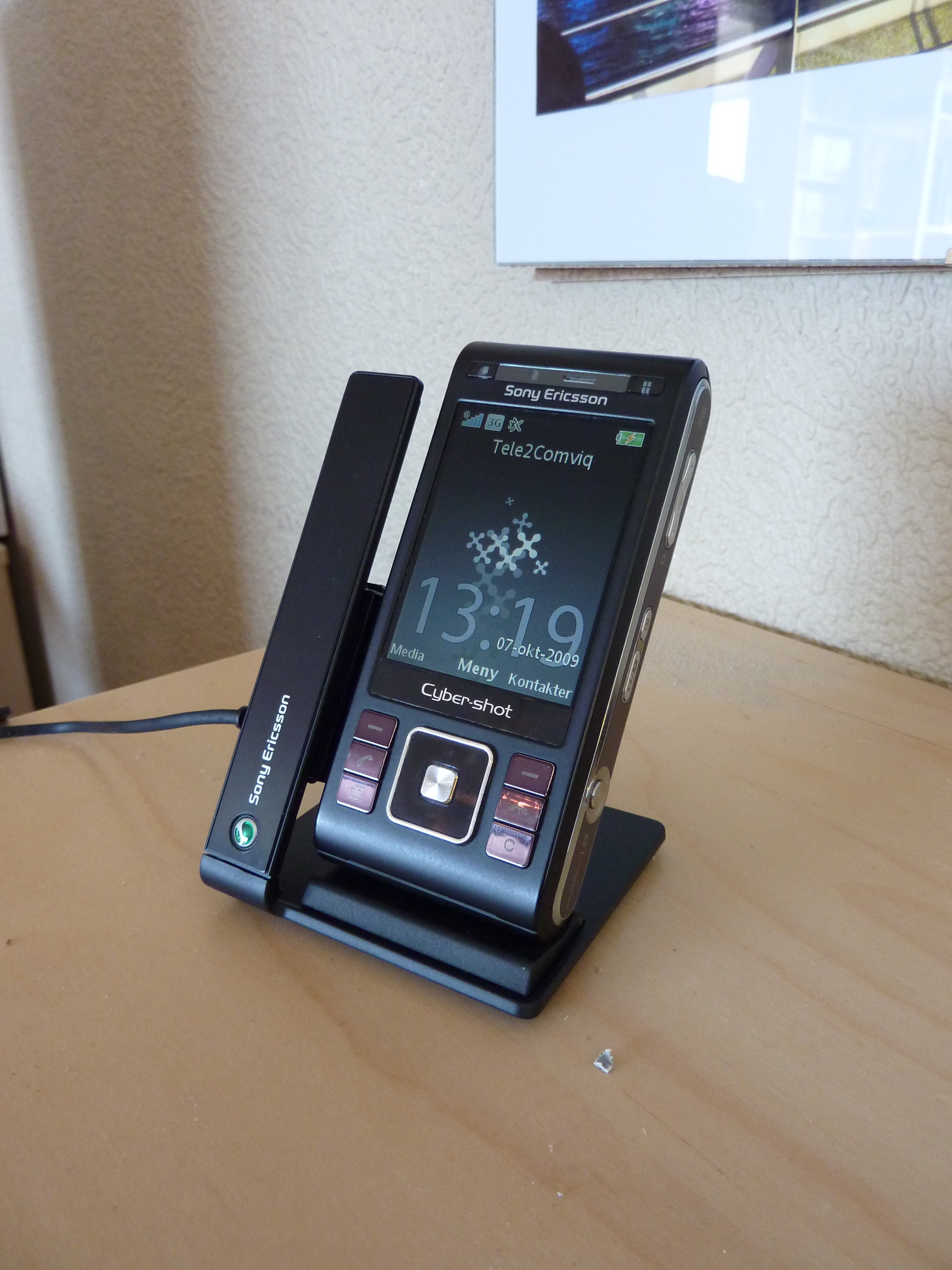
Sony Ericsson C905 in a docking station

=== Connectivity ===
- Blog link
- GPS with A-GPS, with picture geotagging support
- WLAN 802.11b/g, DLNA technology
- NetFront 4.5 web browser with Autorotate
- Microsoft Exchange ActiveSync
- Apple iSync supported via a free plugin from Sony Ericsson
- Bluetooth

=== Audio ===
- Media player 3.0 with MegaBass (simplified version of Walkman 3.0)
- M4A/MP3/MIDI ringtones
- FM Radio with RDS
- Shazam TrackID application to identify music
- PlayNow 5.0

=== Memory ===
- 160 MB internal
- 2 GB M2 included, up to 8GB max. (Sandisk has tested that the biggest memory card size possible on the C905 is 16GB.)

=== Design ===
- Four colours: 'Copper Gold', 'Ice Silver', 'Night Black' and 'Tender Rose'
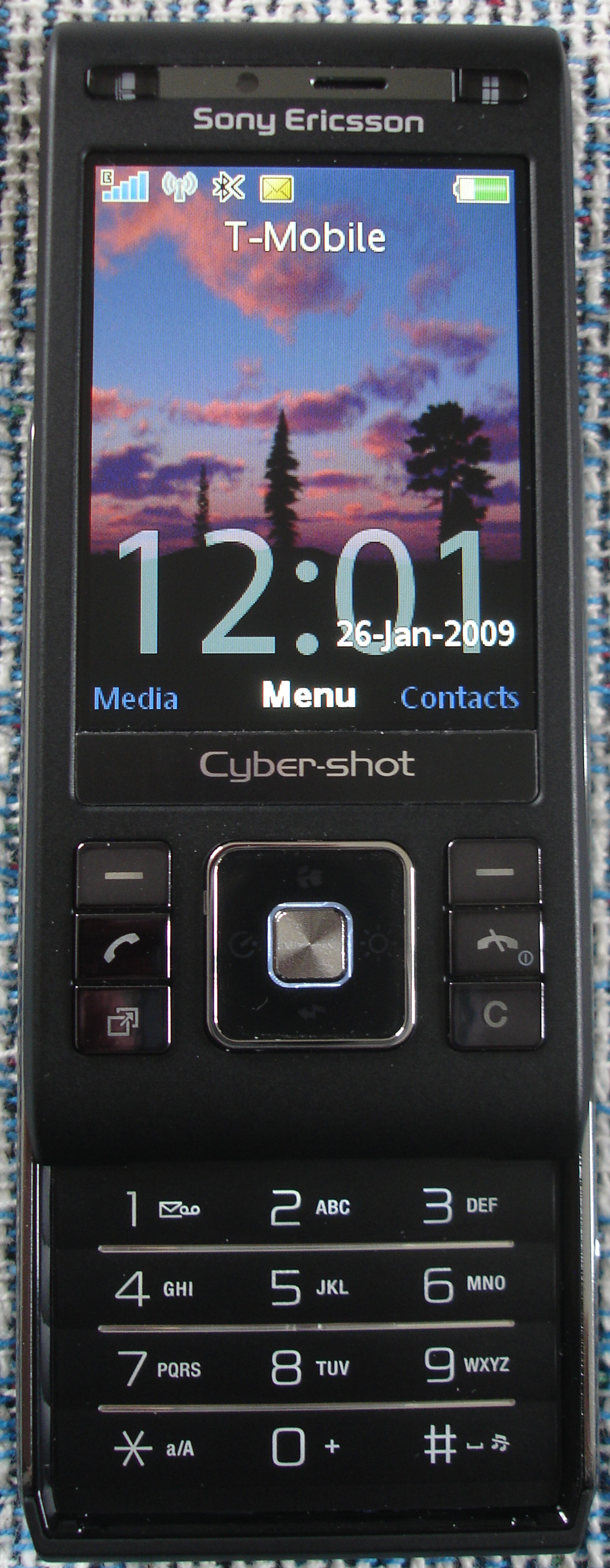

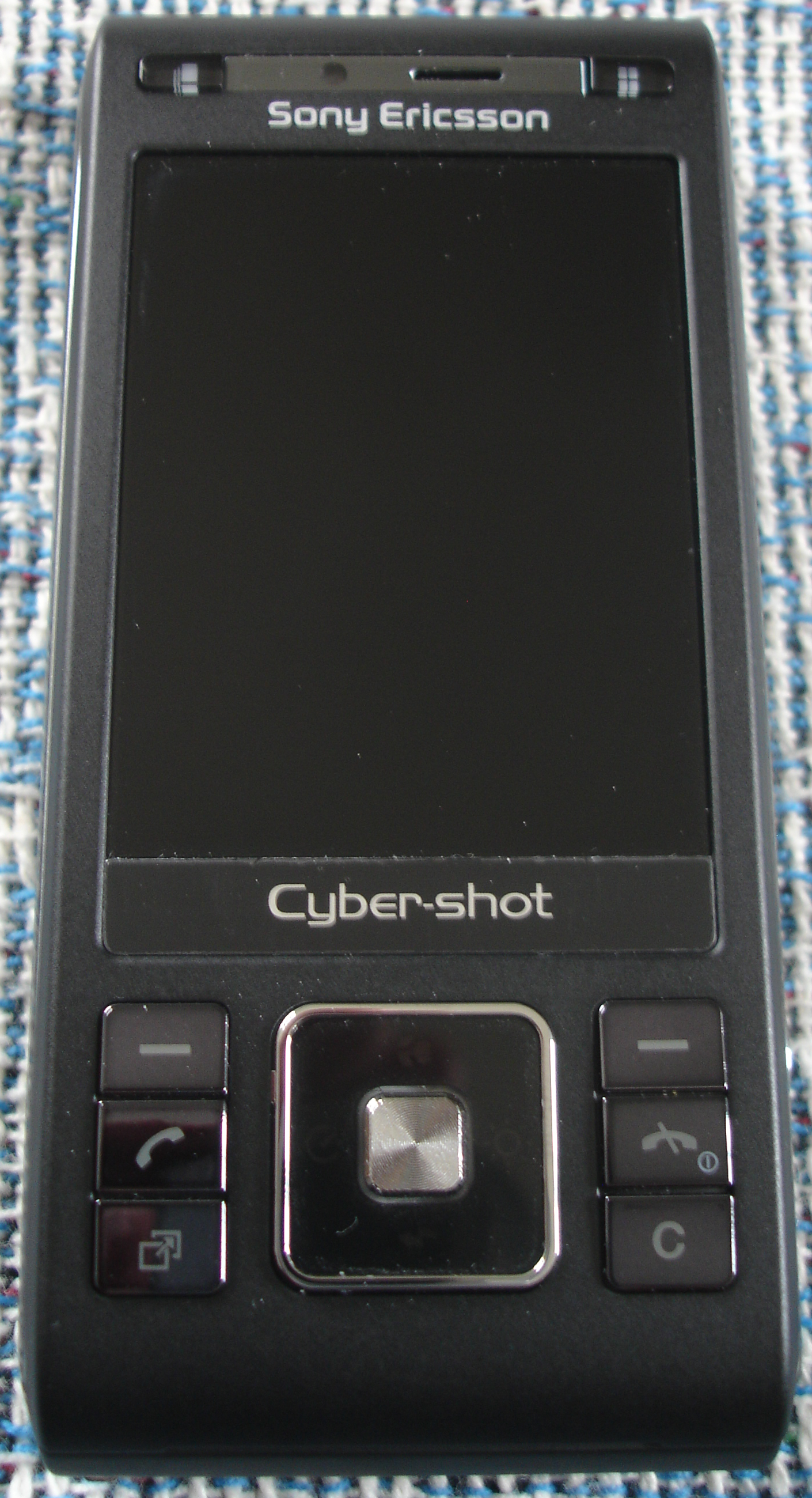

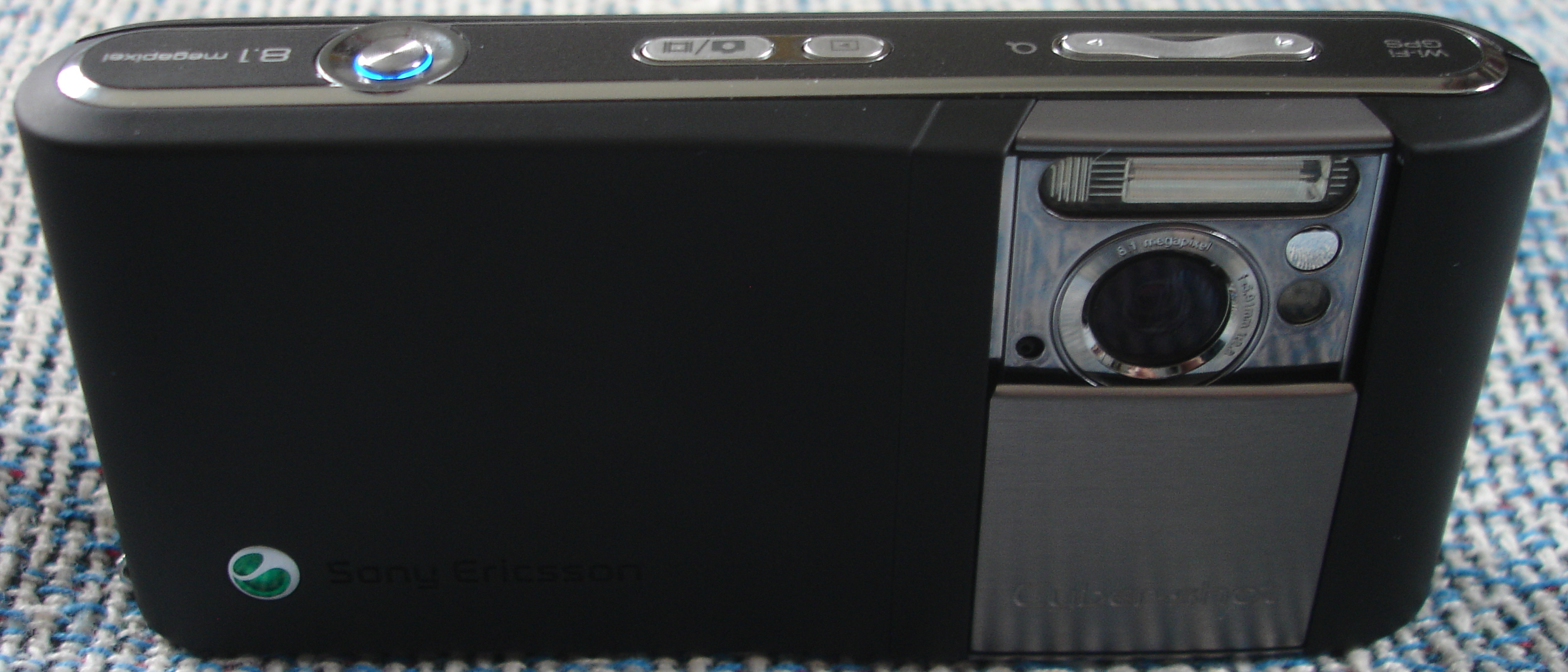

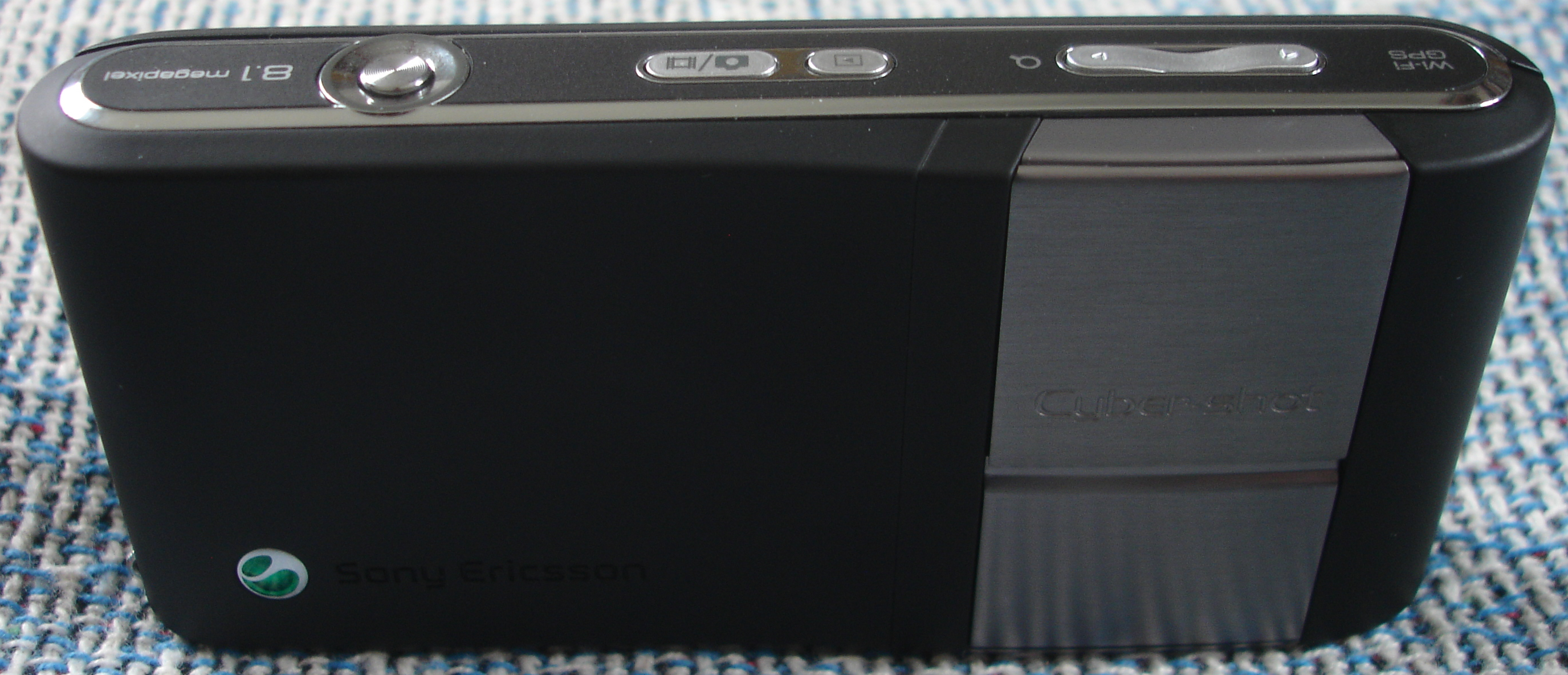

== Startup failures, data corruption and hardware issues ==
For some users, the C905 can suddenly fail to startup, and instead just show a black screen with the backlight turning on and off repeatedly.

This problem happens due to internal data corruption (caused by the phone), and can only be fixed by restoring the phone to its original software/firmware — meaning that all personal data will be erased. On some occasions, this problem can be fixed by using the Update Service software that comes on the CD (or from Sony Ericsson's website). However, personal data will still be erased.

Users are recommended to regularly backup their data using both a Memory Stick — for photos and contacts — and using the software MyPhoneExplorer to back up other data to a PC. A startup failure can be predicted when the text message menu can no longer be opened.

A hardware fault that has been reported frequently is that the earpiece speaker on the slider-screen will quit working due to a fragile connector. This can sometimes be temporarily 'fixed' by depressing and holding the 'c' button on the right side; or by using the speakerphone option. Sony will repair this at no cost (except shipping) if the phone is still in warranty. Vodafone staff claim this is the reason they have stopped selling the phone new.

== See also ==
- Samsung i8510 Innov8
- Samsung M8800 Pixon
- LG Renoir
- Nokia N82
- Sony Ericsson K850i
