= Samsung SGH-G800 =

Mobile phone model

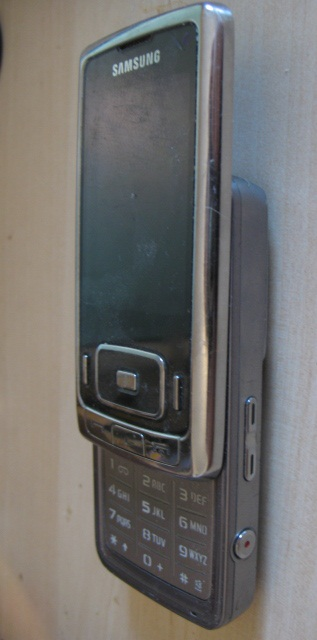
- Manufacturer: Samsung Electronics
- Series: 'G' Series
- Predecessor: Samsung SGH-G600
- Successor: Samsung SGH-G810
- Compatible networks: UMTS, GSM 900/1800/1900
- Form factor: Slide phone
- Dimensions: 102×53×17 mm (4.02×2.09×0.67 in)
- Operating system: proprietary
- CPU: proprietary
- Memory: 160 MB
- Removable storage: microSD
- Rear camera: 5.0-megapixel, 3x zoom, xenon flash
- Front camera: VGA
- Display: 240 x 320 QVGA, 262K colors TFT LCD
- Connectivity: Bluetooth 2.0, USB
- Data inputs: Joystick, keypad

The SGH-G800 is a slider mobile phone part of the Samsung G-series. It features a 5-megapixel camera with xenon flash as well as 3x optical zoom, a very rare feature for camera phones at the time. It was introduced on October 22, 2007 and released in November.

The phone uses microSD cards. It has FM-radio and mp3 playback. This was one of the first mobile phones with 5-megapixel camera (the previous G600 had it before though). Product's software allows many options for taking photos and photo editor. It can be charged with power adapter or via USB cable. It has a 2.4-inch QVGA LCD. Samsung advertised the G800 as the "world's first 5 megapixel camera phone with 3x optical zoom".

The handset was succeeded by the Samsung SGH-G810.

== Features ==
- Vibration: Available
- Camera Flash: Xenon
- Camera Optics: Optical Zoom
- Video Recording: Available
- Java: MIDP 2.0
- Bluetooth: v2.0

== Critical response ==
The Register praised its camera while noting that the optical zoom added bulk. CNET gave 3.5/5, praising the camera and call quality but criticising the camera flash and web browser. Trusted Reviews awarded 8/10. TechRadar praised the camera and optical zoom ability, but criticised the lack of Wi-Fi or smartphone operating system.

== See also ==
Other 5-megapixel phones of the time

- Sony Ericsson K850
- LG Viewty
- Nokia N95
- Nokia N82
