= Picsel =

Picsel was a company and technology founded in Glasgow, Scotland, whose trademark and innovations were used to develop products for handheld devices such as mobile phones and tablets. The founders and original team of Picsel produced award-winning and world leading software and technology which led eventually to the Smartoffice Ltd company branding and selling the SmartOffice application, and other Office suite software for viewing and editing documents on mobile devices. Smartoffice went into administration in 2013, and its residual assets were purchased by Artifex Software Inc, a player in the printer market, in February 2014 and these residual assets were subject to all previous licenses including those sold by the administrators.

== Key features and Recognition ==
The original technology was built with key strengths in cross-platform compatibility, usability, graphic performance and office document compatibility.

== Product availability ==
Over 600+ million Picsel IP products have been sold to date by the founders of Picsel, Imran Khand and Majid Anwar and their successive management teams. They have been particularly popular with the Korean OEMs Samsung Electronics and LG Electronics, and many Japanese OEMs including Sharp, Kyocera, Fujitsu, Sony Ericsson, Casio Hitachi and others.

The SmartOffice app which is being continued to be sold by Artifex is available through app stores for Apple, Android, Symbian, bada and other platforms, and has been well received because of its historical pedigree and market penetration over the last 15 years, prior to Artifex becoming involved. In March 2011, an updated version 1.5 with cross platform support (via Dropbox service) was made available. However, many sales are to OEMs who pre-install Picsel software to devices while manufacturing them. The Samsung SGH-D600 mobile phone was one of the best known devices on which Picsel products were bundled.
An updated version of Smart Office version 2.1 is available on Blackberry Playbook, Windows and Amazon.com. Current Artifex Product line also includes Ghostscript, and MuPDF.
FAQ support is available on www.picselsmartoffice.com/support

== Litigation ==
In February 2009, a patent lawsuit was filed against Apple Inc by Picsel (Research) Ltd, but did not reach court.

== Insolvency ==
In July 2009, Picsel Technologies Ltd (and other companies within the group) entered administration. The company continued trading through this despite staff cut-backs, and after three months was bought back by the original senior management team in a complicated deal which saw only some families of Picsel's patents sold to Samsung.

The new trading company, Picsel UK Ltd, continued to develop and sell similar products, employing many of the same staff, after the management buy-out led by the original founders, who also took the responsibility of the staff and other debtors into the new company setup.

Picsel UK Ltd entered liquidation in June 2012. A new UK trading company, Smartoffice Technologies Ltd emerged, after advice from the companies advisers.

Smartoffice Technologies Ltd continued to develop and market Picsel Smart Office until September 2013 when it entered administration after the floating charge holder (Malaysia Debt Ventures) appointed French Duncan as administrators.

In February 2014, Artifex Software Inc purchased the residual rights to the IP, including both the source code, and the Picsel and SmartOffice brands, subject to the previous existing licenses as confirmed by the legal team of the administrators in several publicised letters and communications. Artifex has been continuing in previous business model; to support and develop the SmartOffice technologies and is continuing to both sell end-user products based upon them, and to license them to third party OEMs, based on the original ideas and technologies created by the founders and developers of Picsel.
