= Samsung SGH-D500 =

Slider-style mobile phone by Samsung

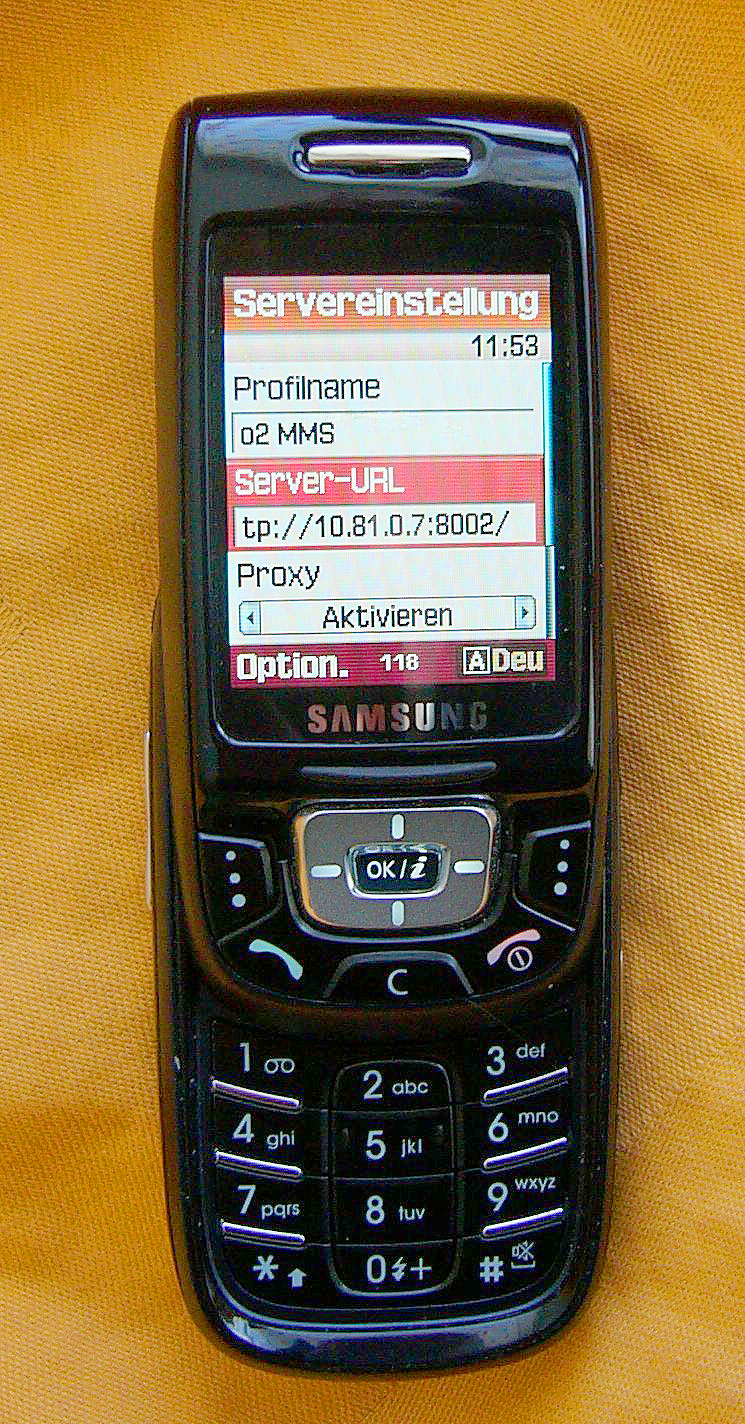
- SGH-D500 server settings in German
- Manufacturer: Samsung Electronics
- Series: D Series
- Availability by region: November 2004
- Discontinued: 2006
- Predecessor: Samsung E800
- Successor: Samsung SGH-D600
- Compatible networks: GSM 900/1800/1900, D500E: GSM 900/1800/1900 + EDGE
- Form factor: Slider
- Dimensions: 3.68 x 1.8 x 1 in (93.5 x 45.7 x 23.5 mm)
- Weight: 3.5 oz (99 g)
- Operating system: Proprietary
- Memory: 92 MB Internal, 80 MB available to user
- Storage: 92 MB
- Battery: 800 mAh Li-Ion
- Rear camera: 1.3 megapixel
- Front camera: None
- Display: 176x220 pixels (QCIF+), 262,144 (18-bit) Color TFT LCD
- External display: none
- Connectivity: GPRS Class 10 (4+1/3+2 slots) 32 - 48 kbit/s, Bluetooth v1.1, IrDA, USB
- Data inputs: Keypad

The Samsung SGH-D500 is a slider-style mobile phone developed and designed by Samsung. It was announced on October 8, 2004 and released at the end of the year as a replacement of the SGH-E800. Considered to be stylish, and incorporating multimedia features such as a 1.3 megapixel digital camera with integrated LED flash, Bluetooth and a MP3 music player, the D500 became very popular and is credited with popularising the 'active' sliding phone concept across all brands.

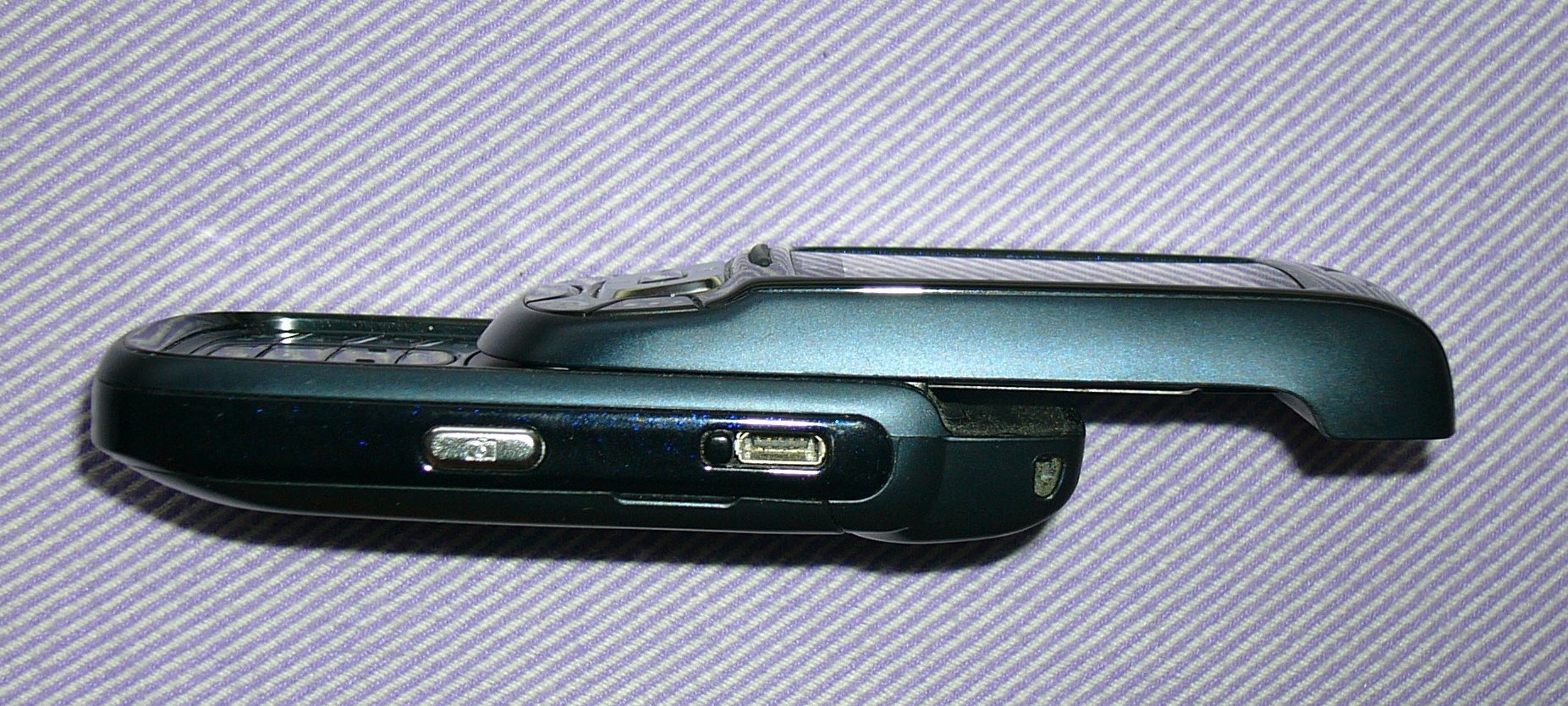
Side view of the D500

The D500 won the prestigious award "Best Mobile Handset" at the 3GSM world congress in Cannes, 2005. The phone sold 10 million units worldwide. Other Samsung handsets that reached this milestone in the 2000s include: the E250, the E700, the J700, the T100 (the company's first million seller), and the S5230 (Star/Tocco Lite). The D500 was succeeded by the D600 introduced a year later.

== Flashing ==
Due to wireless networks supplying the D500 to customers with branded software, this phone is very often "flashed" by owners. This removes/changes onscreen branding, the unpopular shortcut sidebar and non-optional sounds (e.g. branding sound on power-on/off). The new software can add features such as voice-dial and voice-command, and increased memory availability.

== Criticism ==
The SGH-D500 was popular with consumers because of the large screen-size to front-surface ratio, the smooth button and sliding action, powerful flash, and good video/photograph/sound quality. However it received some criticism for not having expandable memory (via a memory slot). There are known issues with the screen of this phone. The screen connector can disconnect, resulting in various display issues. The screen is also vulnerable to being damaged through careless use or accidental impact.

== Variants ==
- SGH-D500C: Asian variant
- SGH-D508: Chinese Anycall variant
- SGH-D500E: Variant with EDGE support

== Related phones ==
- Samsung SGH-E800: Predecessor
- Samsung SGH-D600: Successor
- Samsung SGH-E730: Clamshell equivalent
