= Samsung i8510 Innov8 =

Mobile phone model

Samsung i8510

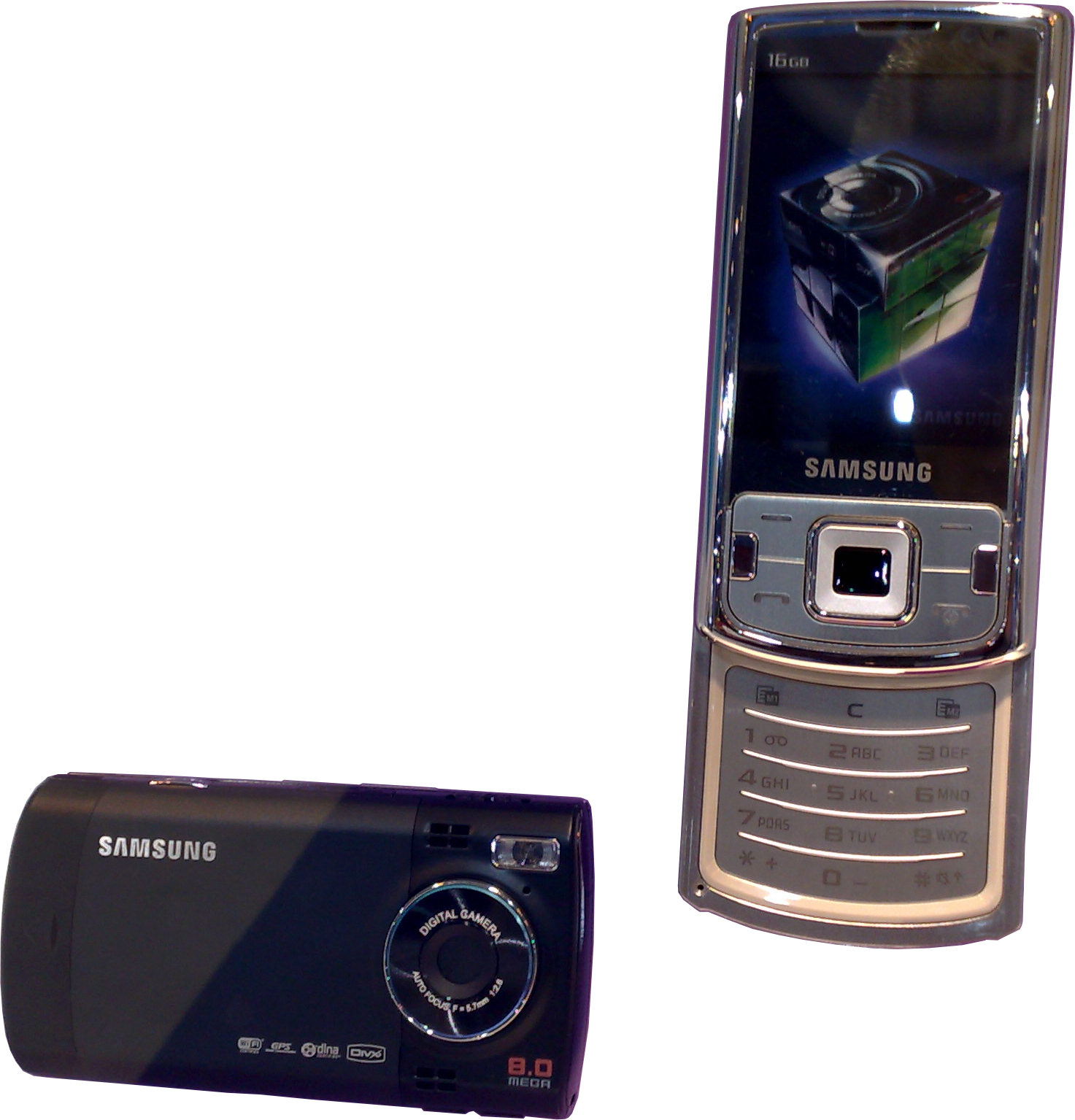
- Manufacturer: Samsung
- Availability by region: October 2008
- Predecessor: Samsung SGH-G810
- Successor: Samsung M8910 Pixon12
- Related: Samsung M8800 Pixon
- Compatible networks: HSDPA (3.5G), Quad band GSM / GPRS / EDGE GSM 850, GSM 900, GSM 1800, GSM 1900
- Form factor: Slider
- Dimensions: 106.5×53.9×17.2 mm (4.19×2.12×0.68 in)
- Weight: 136 g (5 oz)
- Operating system: Symbian OS v9.3, S60 3rd Edition, Feature Pack 2
- CPU: ARM11 330 MHz
- Memory: 50 MB system + 8/16 GB mass memory
- Removable storage: microSD, microSDHC
- Battery: Standard battery, Li-Ion 1200 mAh
- Rear camera: 8 megapixels (3264x2448), autofocus, image stabiliser, video(VGA@30 frame/s, QVGA@120 frame/s), dual LED flash, camera geo-tagging, auto-panorama shot, face, smile and blink detection
- Front camera: QCIF video call (Front)
- Display: 240x320 px, 2.8 in
- Connectivity: USB 2.0, Bluetooth 2.0, Wi-Fi b/g
- Data inputs: Keypad

The Samsung GT-i8510 (marketed as the Samsung INNOV8, pronounced Innovate) is a Symbian OS mobile phone produced by Samsung Electronics, announced on 30 July 2008 and released in late 2008. The Innov8's functions include those of a camera phone and portable media player, including an 8-megapixel camera (which its name refers to) with Dual LED and Schneider-Kreuznach optics.

In addition to offering e-mail, web browsing, local Wi-Fi connectivity and text messaging, the Innov8 uses the S60 3rd Edition platform with Feature Pack 2, much like e.g. Nokia N85. The phone is available with either 8 GB or 16 GB internal memory and both feature a MicroSDHC memory card slot with support for cards up to 32 GB.

The Samsung Innov8 was critically acclaimed and is often considered one of the best Symbian devices of its time.

== Features ==
- Built-in GPS receiver
- A-GPS function
- 3D Graphics PowerVR MBX Lite OpenGL ES 1.1
- Business card scanner
- DivX/H.263 / H.264 / WMV / MP4 player
- MP3 / eAAC+ / WMA / AMR / RealAudio player
- 3.5 mm audio jack
- TV out functionality
- Java MIDP 2.1
- FM radio with RDS
- Organizer
- Built-in handsfree,
- Voice memo/dia
- DLNA support

== See also ==
- Samsung M8800 Pixon
- Samsung i900 Omnia
- Samsung U900 Soul
- Samsung G810
- Nokia N96
- Sony Ericsson C905
- LG KF510
- LG KC550
