= Samsung M8910 Pixon12 =

Smartphone model

- Manufacturer: Samsung Mobile
- Series: S-Series
- Availability by region: June 2009
- Predecessor: Samsung M8800 Pixon; Samsung i8510 Innov8
- Successor: Samsung Galaxy S4 Zoom
- Compatible networks: GSM 800/900/1700/1800/1900/2100; 3G 900/2100
- Form factor: Candybar
- Dimensions: 108×53×13.8 mm (4.25×2.09×0.54 in)
- Weight: 120 g (4 oz)
- Operating system: TouchWiz 2.0 UI
- Memory: 150MB internal
- Storage: up to 16GB
- Removable storage: microSD/microSDHC
- Battery: Li-lon 1100mAh
- Rear camera: 12MP at 4000x3000 pixels (picture); 720p at 30fps (HD video)
- Display: 16M (colors); 480 x 800 pixels (resolution); 3.1 inches AMOLED
- External display: Yes
- Media: AAC, MP3, WAV, WMA, DivX, H263, H264, MP4, WMV, xVID
- Connectivity: Wi-Fi, HSDPA 7.2 Mbps, Bluetooth 2.1 and USB 2.0

Samsung M8910 (also known as Samsung Pixon12) is a high-spec smartphone from Samsung released in June 2009.

It has many features found only in digital cameras, such as Variable aperture, tracking touch autofocus, geo-tagging, face, smile and blink detection, wide dynamic range, Smart Auto mode, image stabilization etc.

== Full specifications ==
Camera

- Megapixels: 12 (Wide-Angle Lens)
- Maximum photo resolution: 4000x3000 pixels
- Optical zoom: None
- Digital zoom: 4x
- Auto focus: Yes
- Flash: Yes
- Recording video: 480p recording at 30fps
- Second (front) camera: Yes
