= Samsung SGH-G600 =

Mobile phone model

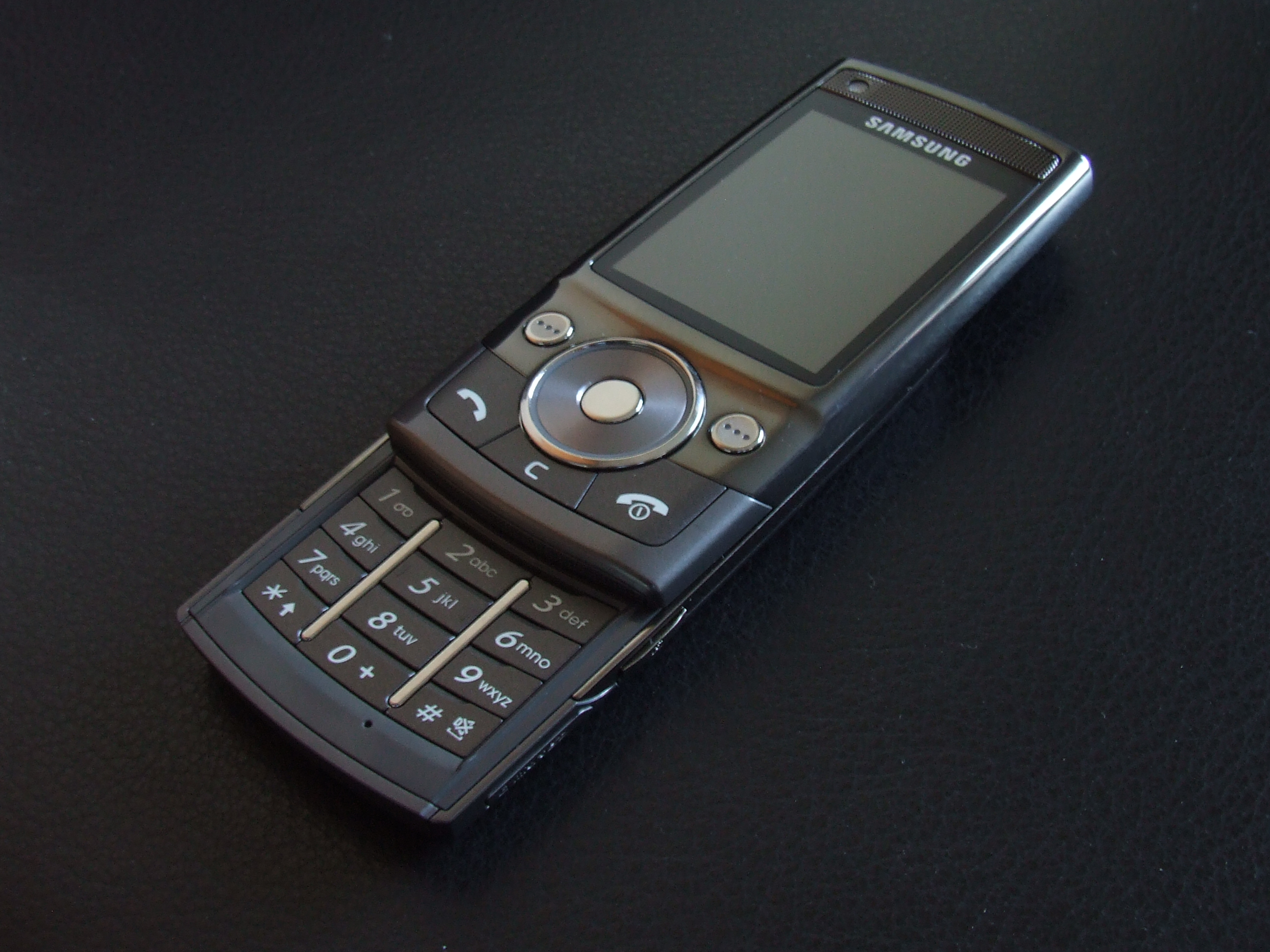
- Manufacturer: Samsung Electronics
- Availability by region: August 2007
- Successor: Samsung SGH-G800
- Compatible networks: GSM 850/900/1800/1900, GPRS, EDGE
- Form factor: Slider
- Dimensions: 4×9×0.6 in (102×229×15 mm)
- Weight: 3.7 oz (105 g)
- Memory: 60 MB
- Removable storage: MicroSD
- Battery: Removable 880mAh Li-ion
- Rear camera: 5.0 megapixel AVI video recording VGA (640x480) DivX 5 + MP3
- Display: 240x320 pixels (QVGA), 16,000,000(24-bit) color TFT LCD
- Connectivity: GPRS Class 10 (4+1/3+2 slots) 32 - 48 kbit/s, Bluetooth 2.0 with A2DP, USB 2.0

The Samsung SGH-G600 is a mobile phone manufactured by Samsung Electronics. The handset comes with a free 1 GB or 512 MB microSD card, depending on country of purchase. The phone comes with a free bluetooth headset (WEP-210), also depending on country of purchase, and is the fourth phone released to have Schneider Kreuznach Optics.
