= Samsung M8800 Pixon =

Cell phone model

- Manufacturer: Samsung Mobile
- Series: M-Series
- Availability by region: September 2008
- Predecessor: None
- Successor: Samsung M8910 Pixon12
- Compatible networks: GSM 800/900/1700/1800/1900/2100; 3G 900/2100
- Form factor: Candybar
- Dimensions: 107.9×54.6×13.88 mm (4.248×2.150×0.546 in)
- Weight: 122 g (4 oz)
- Operating system: TouchWiz UI
- Memory: 200MB internal
- Storage: up to 16GB
- Removable storage: microSD/microSDHC
- Battery: Li-lon 1000mAh
- Rear camera: 8 Megapixels at 3264x2448 pixels (picture); 720 x 480 at 30fps
- Display: 262K Colour TFT; 400 x 240 pixels (WQVGA resolution); 3.2 inches
- External display: Yes
- Media: AAC, MP3, WAV, WMA, DivX, H263, H264, MP4, WMV, xVID
- Connectivity: HSDPA 7.2 Mbps, Bluetooth 2.0 and USB 2.0
- Data inputs: Full Touch Screen

The Samsung M8800, marketed as Samsung Pixon and previously referred to as Samsung Bresson, is a high-spec smartphone from Samsung released in September 2008, one of the first 8-megapixel camera phones (but after the Samsung i8510 Innov8). The phone does not have Wi-Fi connectivity, unlike some competitors like LG Renoir

The phone has:

- a web browser
- Accelerometer for automatic display rotation
- Front and rear cameras
- Video calling
- Calculator
- Music player
