= Samsung SGH-D900 =

Cell phone model

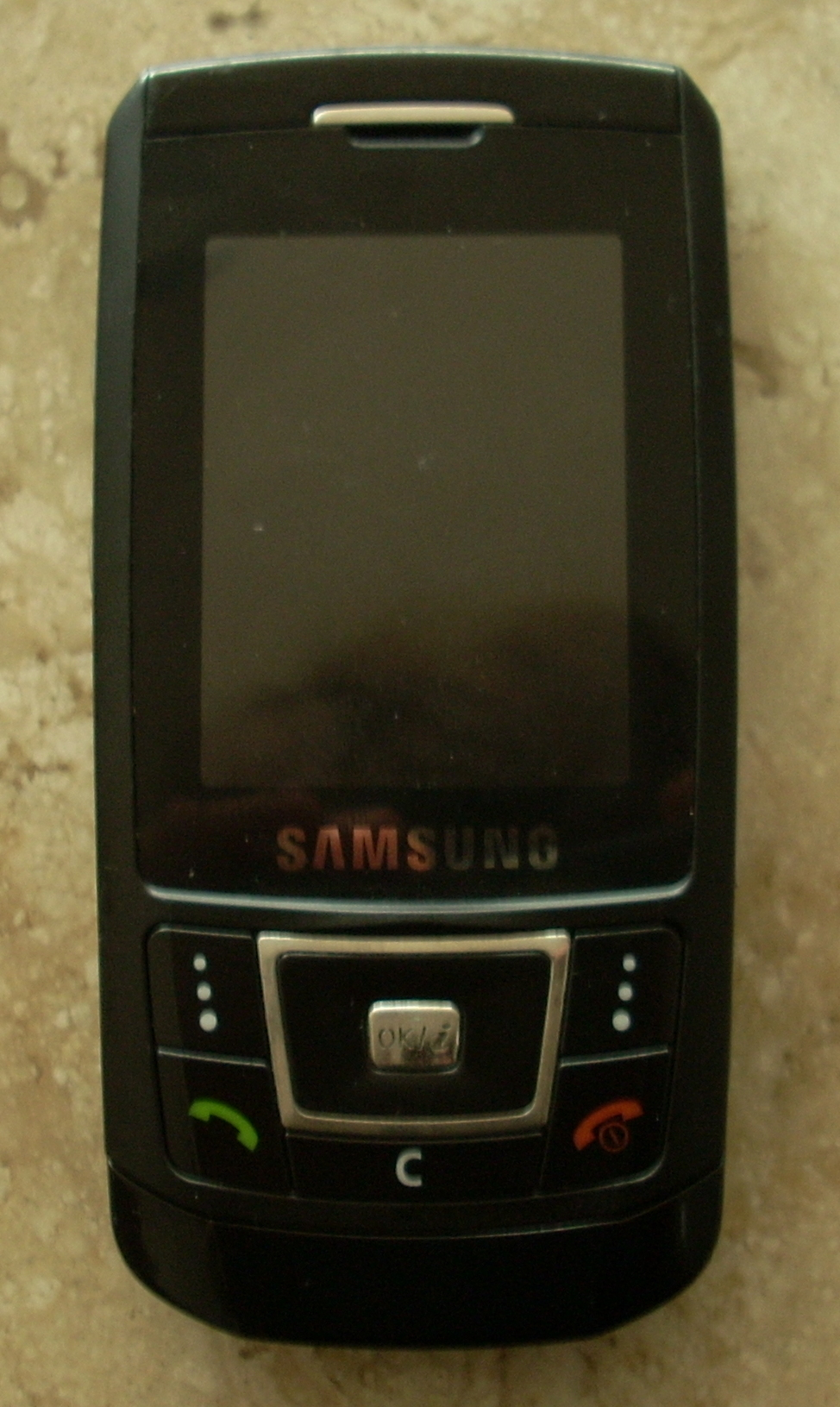
- Manufacturer: Samsung Electronics
- Availability by region: June 2006
- Compatible networks: GSM 850/900/1800/1900 + EDGE
- Form factor: Slider
- Dimensions: 103.5 mm (4.07 in) H 51 mm (2.0 in) W 12.9 mm (0.51 in) D
- Weight: 83 g (2.9 oz)
- Storage: 60 MB
- Removable storage: microSD
- Rear camera: 3.15 Megapixel
- Display: 240x320 pixels (QVGA), 262,144 (18-bit) Color TFT LCD
- Connectivity: GPRS Class 10 (4+1/3+2 slots) up to 236.8kbit/s, Bluetooth v2.0, USB

The Samsung SGH-D900, also known as the Ultra Edition 12.9 or Black Carbon, is a slider-style mobile phone created by Samsung Electronics that was announced in Q3 2006 as part of the Samsung Ultra Edition line. It is marketed as the world's thinnest slider phone. Since the end of 2006, a Wine Red edition was added and 2007 marked the introduction of a chrome edition to the lineup. There is also an upgrade of this model, the Samsung D900i which can be used to access documents on a computer from a phone and added an FM radio as well as was made out of higher-quality materials.

The D900 was succeeded by Z720, also known as Ultra Edition 13.8 in August 2006, following the 3MP camera, QVGA display, upgraded interface and high-speed HSDPA/3G connectivity and it was available exclusively for Vodafone, Movistar (Spain only) & China Mobile (Z728 only). Vodafone also sold the exclusive McLaren Special Edition units along with Sharp GX29 and 770SH.

== Features ==
The phone has features including:

- Quad-band capabilities, allowing it to be used as a mobile phone on all major GSM networks across the globe
- Built in hands-free function
- Built in Bluetooth wireless technology
- Custom animated backgrounds (varies with country of sale)
- Memory card slot for optional MicroSD memory card up to 2GB ( 2 GB only with the latest firmware)
- 60 MB internal memory
- MP3 Ringtones
- Speakerphone
- Digital audio player with MP3, WMA and AAC/AAC+ playback
- 3.15 Megapixel digital camera with many shooting modes and an integrated LED photo/video light (flash), autofocus, and the ability to perform basic image editing functions
- MP4 video recording CIF 352x288, QVGA 320x240, QCIF 176x144, SQCIF 128x96 playback
- Java games
- Alarm clock with three configurable alarms
- Calendar
- Calculator
- FM Radio (D900i only)

The slider can be configured to accept and close calls, as well as locking and unlocking the keypad. Settings are available which allow for the phone to stay unlocked even when closed.

However, the Samsung SGH-D900 also lacks some basic physical features common to most cellphones. For one, there is no standard carrying case or belt clip, nor are there any compatible belt clips, so the only way to fix it to a belt is to purchase a generic belt holder that has the same dimensions as the phone. Also, there is no protrusion upon which to tie a cellphone strap. This means that people who enjoy personalizing their cellphones with charms, pendants, and other personal straps will not have this choice.

The SGH-D900 suffers from a number of software quirks. The Java implementation does not allow applications to access the network without repeatedly asking the user for permission - there is no "always allow" option. The handset also lacks the ability to use imported files as an SMS alert tone, leaving only the small default selection of sounds available to the user. The camera features also have a number of quirks, such as the shutter sound preceding the actual image capture by approximately half a second (leading to blurred and poorly aimed images as the user moves the phone after the expected exposure duration has passed.) In addition the camera does not take a photo if you hold down the camera button - the user must press and release quickly. Photos cannot be saved directly to the memory card, and moving the photos already taken leads to duplicate file names. Also, only images in "My Photos" folder can be zoomed, so any imported images must be moved to that folder before they can be zoomed.

For the SGH-D900i, Samsung removed Picsel Document Viewer in favor of the FM radio function.

== Performance ==
The SGH-D900 was the thinnest slider phone until the introduction of the SGH-U600 model in 2007, (the Samsung U600 has a thickness of 1.09 cm (0.43 in) and the D900 and D900i both have thicknesses of 12.9mm) and then when the E840 was released (thickness of 1.06 cm (0.42 in)). The D900 comes with a 3.15 megapixel camera (2048x1536 pixels). Video capabilities are higher than the usual standards and recording is made in CIF (352x288 pixels) resolution. The internal memory and optional MicroSD card slot makes it ideal for listening to music on the go. A loud speakerphone and voice clarity filtration software makes for easy use in noisy locations. The battery life is decent for such a compact cellphone, and can last for few days on standby or approximately 5 to 6 hours of conversation. The slider is easy to operate, with a protrusion for the thumb that allows it to be easily extended or retracted. The interface inside it does not allow the users to modify the phone's profiles or add applications, compared to its rivals where you can upgrade the firmware through USB.

== Photo gallery ==
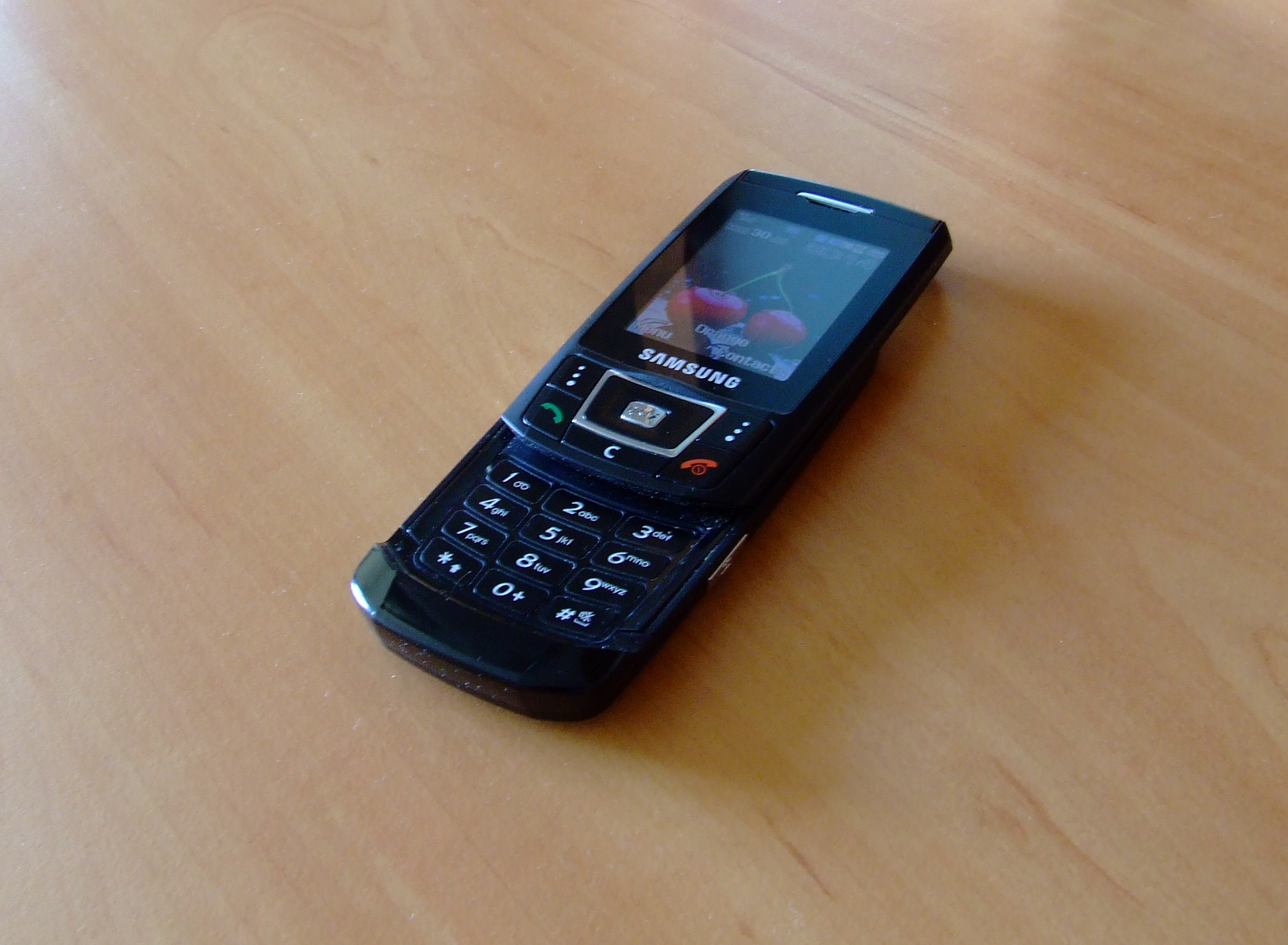
Samsung SGH-D900

Samsung SGH-D900
