= Samsung SGH-D600 =

Mobile phone by Samsung

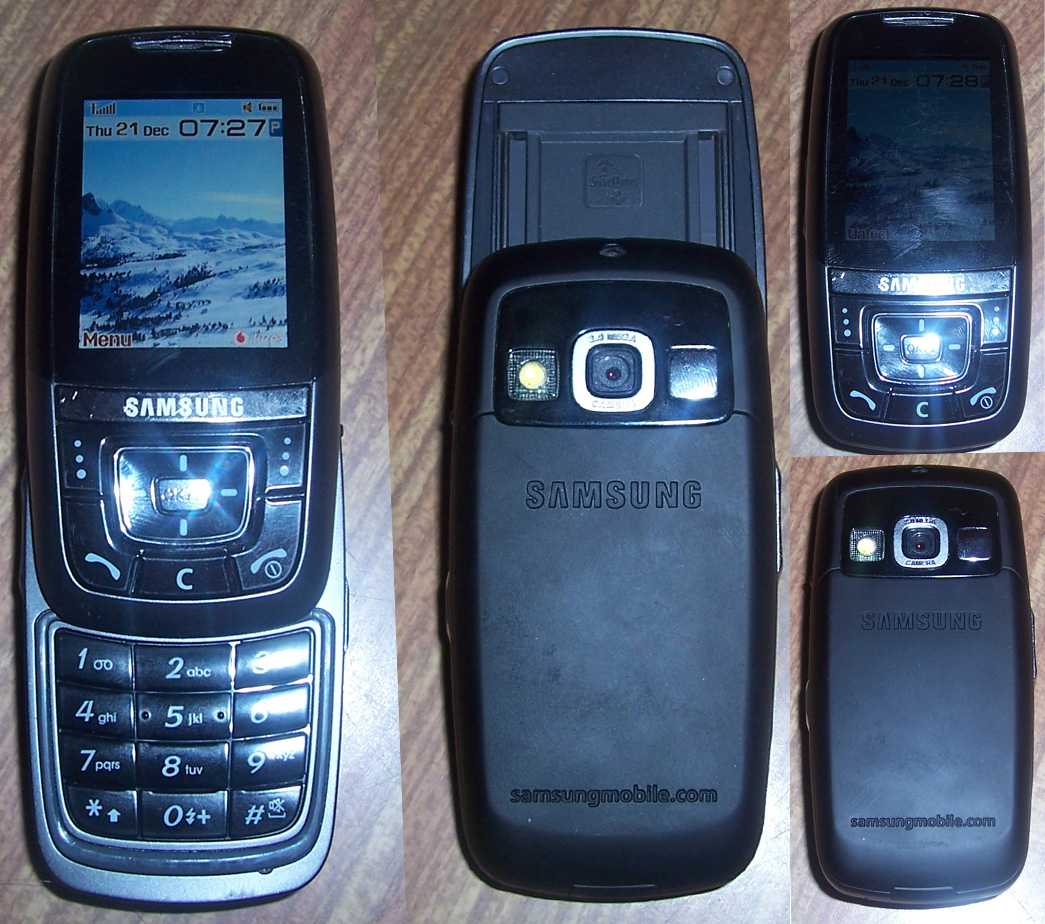
- Manufacturer: Samsung Electronics
- Availability by region: 2005-06 (D600); 2007 (D600i)
- Predecessor: Samsung SGH-D500
- Successor: Samsung SGH-D800
- Compatible networks: GSM 850/900/1800/1900; D600E: GSM 900/1800/1900, EDGE
- Form factor: Slider
- Dimensions: 3.78" X 1.83" X .85" (96 x 46.5 x 21.5 mm)
- Weight: 3.63 oz (103 g)
- Operating system: Proprietary
- Memory: 81 MB, 4 MB for Java applications
- Removable storage: microSD
- Rear camera: 2 Megapixel
- Display: 240x320 pixels (QVGA) TFT LCD, 16-bit color
- Connectivity: GPRS Class 10 (4+1/3+2 slots) 32 - 48 kbit/s, EDGE Class 10 (D600E only), 236.8 kbit/s, Bluetooth 1.2, USB

The Samsung SGH-D600 (and its successor, the D600i) is a GSM mobile phone released in the first quarter of 2005 made by Samsung Electronics.

The SGH-D600i is a later version of the SGH-D600, released in 2007 to address issues concerning microSD card support.

== Features and specifications ==
The Samsung SGH-D600 is the successor to the Samsung SGH-D500, and differs from it with a slightly revised design, a higher resolution 2-megapixel camera located outside the sliding area instead of inside, TV output, and support for microSD external flash memory cards. It also includes a Picsel Viewer for Microsoft Office documents. It is available in three colors, black, grey and red. The SGH-D600 also includes a camera with a resolution of 1600x1200 pixels, Bluetooth connectivity, and a 240x320 pixel screen.

The battery claims to have a stand-by time of up to 300 hours and a talk time of up to 7 hours.

== Reception and criticism ==
The Register praised its looks and small size. Trusted Reviews awarded it 9/10, calling it "a great looking phone with a screen that puts other handsets to shame". CNet gave a positive review scoring 3.5/5 suggesting it was "good both for professionals and those looking for fun features".

The phone's poor visual TV out quality has received criticism.

== Variants ==
- SGH-D600E: A variant of D600 with EDGE connectivity with tri-band instead of quad-band.
- SGH-D606: Exclusively sold on Rogers in Canada.
- SGH-D608: Chinese Anycall variant sold for the Chinese market. It was also sold on China Mobile in China.
- SGH-D600i: A variant of D600 with fixed microSD/TransFlash problems.

== Related phones ==
- Samsung SCH-U620: CDMA phone with identical design.
- Samsung SGH-C300: Lower end slider phone with similar design and Yamaha MA-2 sound chip.
- Samsung SGH-D500: The predecessor to the SGH-D600.
