= Samsung SGH-U600 =

Mobile phone manufactured by Samsung

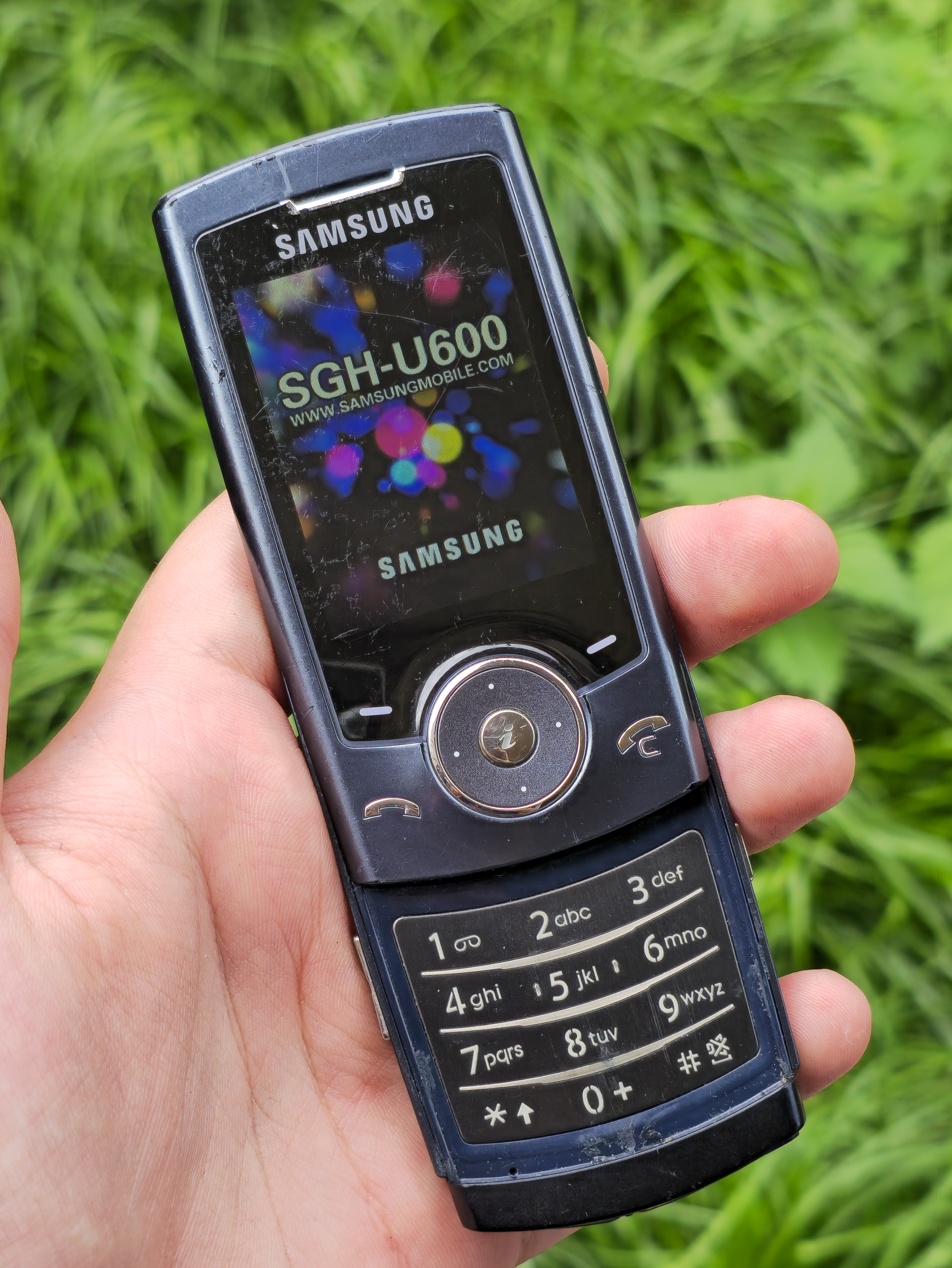
- Availability by region: April 2007
- Compatible networks: GSM 850/900/1800/1900
- Dimensions: 103.2×49.3×10.9 mm (4.06×1.94×0.43 in)
- Weight: 81g
- Memory: 60 MB available to user, MicroSD memory card up to 2 GB, 1000 SMS messages
- Display: 240x320 pixels QVGA 262,144 (18-bit) colour TFT LCD
- Connectivity: GPRS Class 10 (4+1/3+2 slots) 32 - 48 kbit/s, Bluetooth 2.0, USB 2.0
- Codename: Eclair

The Samsung SGH-U600, introduced in 2007, is a mobile phone manufactured in South Korea by Samsung and is part of the Ultra Edition II series of Samsung phones. It is a sliding phone and the thinnest phone of its time. One of its main features are the call and select buttons, which are touch-sensitive instead of physical buttons.

== Specifications and features ==
The phone has features including:

- 85 MHz Processor
- 2.2" TFT Screen, 262.000 colors
- Quad-band (800/900/1800/1900) GSM capabilities, allowing it to be used as a mobile phone on all major GSM networks across the globe
- Touchpad
- Built-in hands-free function
- Built-in Bluetooth wireless technology, A2DP
- Custom animated backgrounds (varies with country of sale) known as uGo. For example- when you are in Paris, the background will turn into Arc de Triomphe etc.; When its daytime, the picture will be in daylight and vice versa.
- MicroSD card slot for optional MicroSD memory card up to 2 GB
- 60 MB internal memory
- MP3 Ringtones^{*}
- Speakerphone
- Digital audio player with MP3 + XviD playback video resolution CIF 352x288 pixels
- Bang & Olufsen ICEPower amplifier
- 3.2 megapixel digital camera with an integrated LED flash, autofocus, and the ability to perform basic image editing functions
- XviD video recording/playback (avi also supported)
- Java games (Bobby Carrot, TimeRider II, Asphalt Urban GT (trial), Midnight Pool (trial), Minigolf Las Vegas (trial), Tetris (trial))
- Alarm clock with infinite configurable alarms
- Calendar (Note: The calendar on the phone only works for dates between the years 2000 and 2016.)
- Calculator
- FM radio (Headphones must be used to hear by lori)
- Smart Search
- World Clock
- Converter for Currency, Length, Weight, Volume, Area and Temperature
- Timer
- Stopwatch
- Offline mode (Flight mode)
- A shortcut to the WAP Google/Yahoo page from the main menu. On some versions (depending on country/firmware) this icon is replaced with a Bluetooth icon.
- Built-in web browser Access NetFront 3.2.
- The Samsung U600 Vibe (U600i) offers haptic technology which is essentially a small vibration whenever one of the touch sensitive keys are tapped
- Black & White UI with the Samsung technology uPlus/uTrack/uMenu interface

=== Slider settings ===
The slider can be configured to accept and close calls, as well as to close all open applications (except the MP3 player when settings are set properly). (These are the only settings).

Settings are available which allow for the phone to stay unlocked when closed. This is also the first Samsung phone that provides the availability to use MP3 files as SMS message tones.

=== Video playback and conversion ===
Full-length movies can be converted by using Samsung PC Studio which comes with the phone.

Mencoder can also be used with this command line to convert file inputName.flv (or any other video type) to outputName.mp4:

mencoder -oac lavc -ovc lavc -of lavf -lavcopts aglobal=1:vglobal=1:vcodec=mpeg4:acodec=libfaac:vbitrate=256:abitrate=64 -lavfopts format=mp4 -ofps 15 -vf scale=320:240,harddup -o outputName.mp4 inputName.flv

While recording, the video cannot be paused. The output framerate of the video is 8 frame/s.

== Issues ==
- In some firmware versions, the first 1.5 seconds (approx.) of an MP3 ringtone is cut off. This can be circumvented by inserting 1.5 seconds of silence in the beginning of the audio file, using a digital audio editor.
- The phone runs on the AGERE II platform, causing the phone's calendar to be limited to years between 2000 and 2016.

== Reception ==
The Samsung SGH-U600 received mostly positive reviews.

GSMArena reviewed the device; the design, the display quality, the camera quality and the audio quality were praised. However, it was noted that the glossy surface of the display caused poor display visibility under the sunlight.

Kent German from CNET reviewed the device and gave it 7 points out of 10. He praised the camera quality, the display quality and the design but criticized the touch-sensitive buttons, the proprietary headphone jack and the audio quality. He also noted that there was a slight lag in the user interface.

TechRadar reviewed the device, giving it 4.5 stars out of 5. In general, they were very positive about the device. The design, the camera and Smart Search file searching feature were considered as the pros while lack of 3G, lack of definition between the keys and the complicated user interface was considered as the cons of the device.
