= List of Sony Ericsson products =

The following is a list of products manufactured under the Sony Ericsson brand. Most of the models have been released under multiple names, depending on region of release, currently usually indicated by a letter added to the end of the model number ('i' for international, 'a' for North America, and 'c' for mainland China), but indicated on some (mostly older) models by a slightly differing model number. Typically, there is one version for the European and US market, and another for the Asian market. However, some models have yet more versions. Most "Walkman" branded models are also released as a non-Walkman version; such as Sony Ericsson W580 and the S500. These versions usually differ only slightly.

== International phones ==
Each phone in boldface indicates that the phone is a smartphone.

S = Status, where P indicates under production, D is discontinued and U indicates upcoming .

=== C series: Cyber-shot (2008, 2009) ===
Phone model	Screen type	Released	S	Technology	Form factor	Camera
Sony Ericsson C510	Color	2009	D	GSM, UMTS	Candybar	3.2-megapixel
Sony Ericsson C702	Color	2008	D	GSM, UMTS	Candybar	3.2-megapixel
Sony Ericsson C901	Color	2009	D	GSM, UMTS, HSDPA	Candybar	5-megapixel
Sony Ericsson C902	Color	2008	D	GSM, UMTS, HSDPA	Candybar	5-megapixel
Sony Ericsson C903	Color	2009	D	GSM, UMTS	Slider	5-megapixel
Sony Ericsson C905	Color	2008	D	GSM, UMTS, HSDPA	Slider	8.1-megapixel

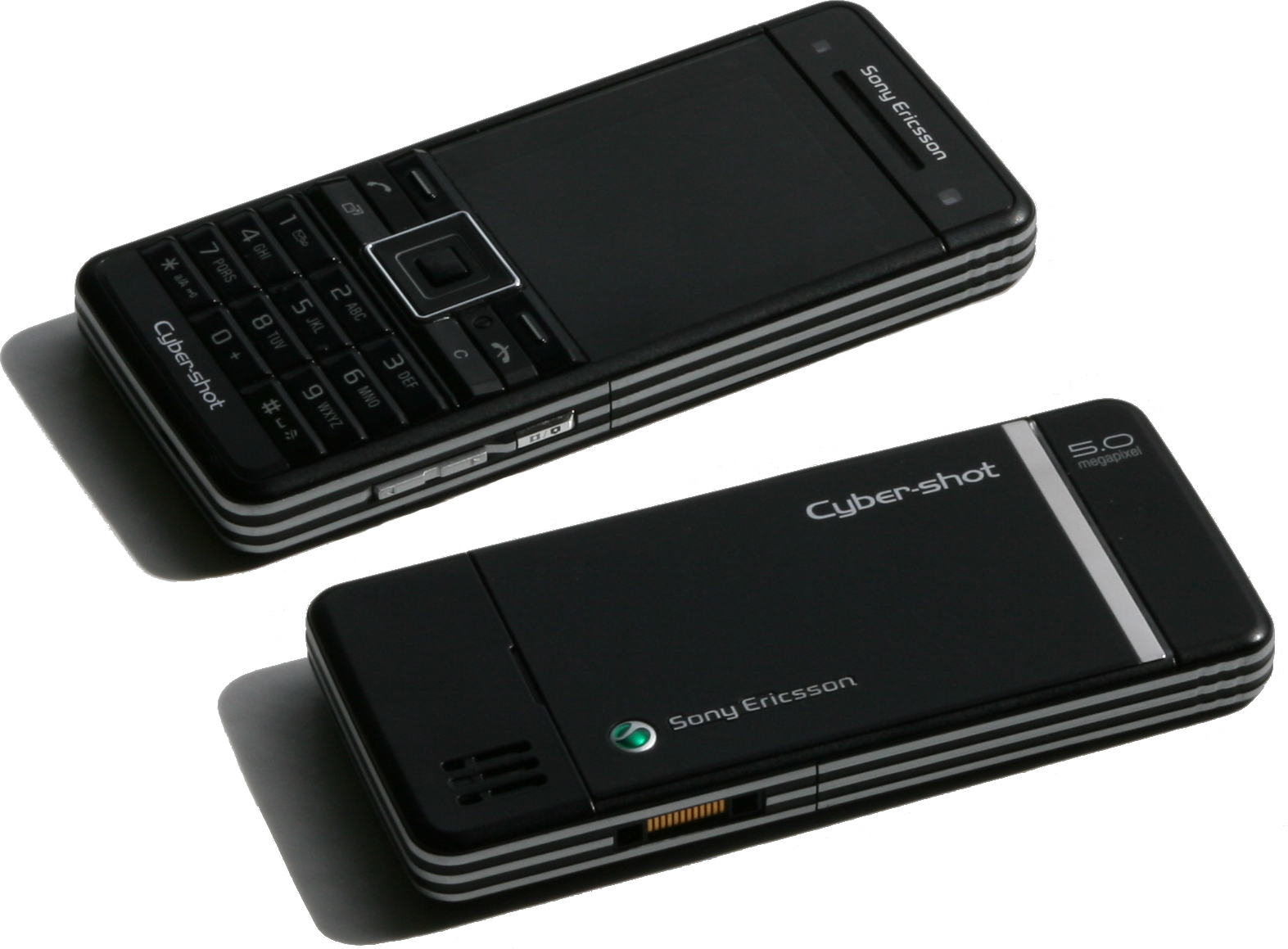
Sony Ericsson C902

==== C902 ====
The Sony Ericsson C902 was released during the second quarter of 2008. It is a java based feature device running on Sony Ericsson's proprietary A200 platform. A special feature was the presence of 8 touch sensitive keys using capacitive technology for the camera mode. The camera technology includes face detection and the music player is similar to the system used on the company's "Walkman" series handsets. The phone is the first in Sony Ericsson's new 'Cyber-shot' C-series of phones, designed to be a successor to the popular K800i and the K850. The C902 is featured in the James Bond film Quantum of Solace, and has been praised for its user interface design and its build quality. Although the device received favorable reviews, analysts did not expect it to reach the same level of popularity or sales as its predecessor, the K800i, because it was not intended to be a "flagship model."

=== CK series: Messaging phones (2011) ===
Phone model	Screen type	Released	S	Technology	Form factor	Camera
Sony Ericsson txt(CK13)	Color	2011	D	GSM	Candybar	None
Sony Ericsson txt Pro(CK15)	Color	2011	D	GSM	Side-Sliding Qwerty-Equipped Touchscreen	3.15-megapixel

=== F series: Fun phones (2004–2009) ===
Phone model	Screen type	Released	S	Technology	Form factor	Camera
Sony Ericsson Jalou (F100i)	Color	2009	D	GSM, HSDPA	Clamshell	3.2-megapixel
Sony Ericsson F305	Color	2008	D	GSM	Slider	2-megapixel
Sony Ericsson F500i	Color	2004	D	GSM	Candybar	1.1-megapixel

=== G series: Generation web phones (2008) ===
Phone model	Screen type	Released	S	Technology	Form factor	Camera
Sony Ericsson G502	Color	2008	D	GSM, HSDPA	Candybar	2-megapixel
**Sony Ericsson G700**	Color	2008	D	GSM, UMTS	Candybar	3.2-megapixel
Sony Ericsson G705	Color	2008	D	GSM, HSDPA	Slider	3.2-megapixel
**Sony Ericsson G900**	Color	2008	D	GSM, UMTS	Candybar	5-megapixel

==== G700 ====
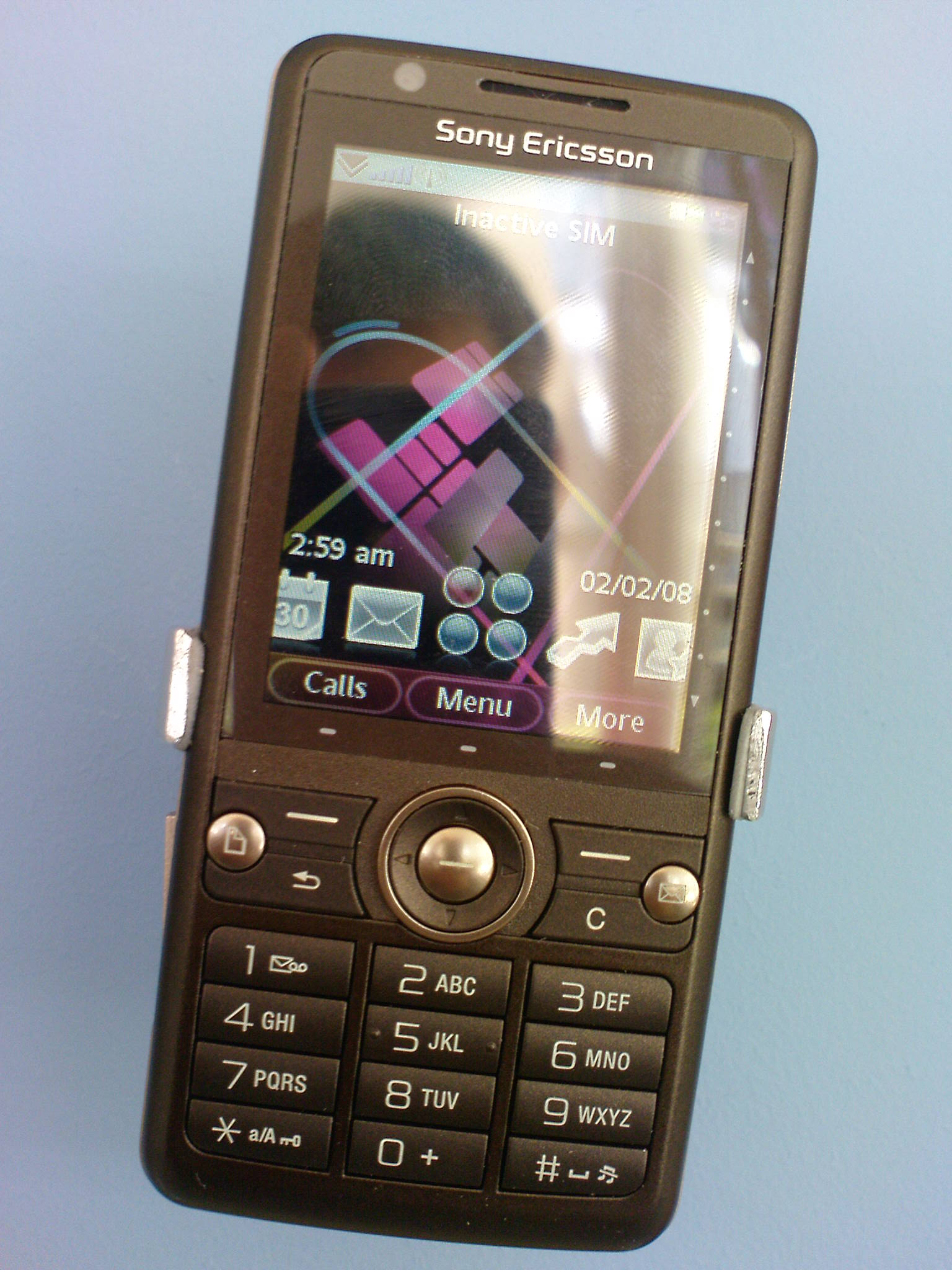
Sony Ericsson G700

The Sony Ericsson G700 was announced at the Mobile World Congress (formerly 3GSM congress) February 2008 and is based on the Symbian OS 9.1 UIQ 3.0 platform. The handset has had below average reviews, with a lot of reviewers criticizing the phone for being priced too high as the better equipped G900 is in the same price bracket while others have lamented the fact that Sony Ericsson chose to implement the same technology that had been presented in late 2006 in the P1. A "business edition" also exists for the Sony Ericsson G700, which has no camera.

==== G900 ====
Announced at the 2008 Mobile World Congress (formerly 3GSM congress) in February of that year, G900 is a mid-to-high-end smartphone based on the Symbian 9.1 UIQ 3.0 platform. The phone sports high quality sound, 3G, Wi-Fi, and a clear 5.0-megapixel camera.

=== J series: Junior phones (2004–2010) ===
Some phones are part of Sony Ericsson's "Greenheart" range.

Phone model	Screen type	Released	S	Technology	Form factor	Camera
Sony Ericsson Elm (J10i)	Color	2010	D	GSM, HSPA	Candybar	5-megapixel
Sony Ericsson Hazel (J20i)	Color	2010	D	GSM, HSPA	Slider	5-megapixel
Sony Ericsson J100	Color	2006	D	GSM	Candybar	None
Sony Ericsson Naite (J105)	Color	2009	D	GSM, HSPA	Candybar	2-megapixel
Sony Ericsson Cedar (J108i)	Color	2010	D	GSM, HSPA	Candybar	2-megapixel
Sony Ericsson J110	Color	2007	D	GSM	Candybar	None
Sony Ericsson J120	Color	2007	D	GSM	Candybar	None
Sony Ericsson J132	Color	2008	D	GSM	Candybar	None
Sony Ericsson J200	Color	2004	D	GSM	Candybar	None
Sony Ericsson J210	Color	2005	D	GSM	Candybar	None
Sony Ericsson J220	Color	2005	D	GSM	Candybar	None
Sony Ericsson J230	Color	2005	D	GSM	Candybar	None
Sony Ericsson J300	Color	2005	D	GSM	Candybar	None

=== K series: Camera phones (2004–2008) ===
Some phones have Cyber-shot branding.

Phone model	Screen type	Released	S	Technology	Form factor	Camera
Sony Ericsson K200	Color	2007	D	GSM	Candybar	VGA
Sony Ericsson K205	Color	2007	D	GSM	Candybar	VGA
Sony Ericsson K220	Color	2007	D	GSM	Candybar	VGA
Sony Ericsson K300	Color	2004	D	GSM	Candybar	VGA
Sony Ericsson K310	Color	2006	D	GSM	Candybar	VGA
Sony Ericsson K320	Color	2006	D	GSM	Candybar	VGA
Sony Ericsson K330	Color	2008	D	GSM	Candybar	VGA
Sony Ericsson K500	Color	2004	D	GSM	Candybar	VGA
Sony Ericsson K510	Color	2006	D	GSM	Candybar	1.3-megapixel
Sony Ericsson K530	Color	2007	D	GSM, UMTS	Candybar	2-megapixel
Sony Ericsson K550	Color	2007	D	GSM	Candybar	2-megapixel
Sony Ericsson K600	Color	2005	D	GSM, UMTS	Candybar	1.3-megapixel
Sony Ericsson K610i	Color	2006	D	GSM, UMTS	Candybar	2-megapixel
Sony Ericsson K630	Color	2007	D	GSM, HSDPA	Candybar	2-megapixel
Sony Ericsson K660i	Color	2008	D	GSM, HSDPA	Candybar	2-megapixel
Sony Ericsson K700	Color	2004	D	GSM	Candybar	VGA
Sony Ericsson K750	Color	2005	D	GSM	Candybar	2-megapixel
Sony Ericsson K770	Color	2007	D	GSM, UMTS	Candybar	3.2-megapixel
Sony Ericsson K790	Color	2006	D	GSM, EDGE	Candybar	3.2-megapixel
Sony Ericsson K800	Color	2006	D	GSM, UMTS	Candybar	3.2-megapixel
Sony Ericsson K810	Color	2007	D	GSM, UMTS	Candybar	3.2-megapixel
Sony Ericsson K850	Color	2007	D	EDGE, HSDPA	Candybar	5-megapixel

=== M series: Messaging phones (2006) ===
Phone model	Screen type	Released	S	Technology	Form factor	Camera
**Sony Ericsson M600**	Color	2006	D	GSM, UMTS	Candybar	None

=== P series: PDA phones (2002–2007) ===
Phone model	Screen type	Released	S	Technology	Form factor	Camera
**Sony Ericsson P1**	Color	2007	D	GSM, UMTS	PDA	3.2-megapixel
**Sony Ericsson P800**	Color	2002	D	GSM	PDA	VGA
**Sony Ericsson P900**	Color	2003	D	GSM	PDA	VGA
**Sony Ericsson P910**	Color	2004	D	GSM	PDA	VGA
**Sony Ericsson P990**	Color	2006	D	GSM, UMTS	PDA	2-megapixel

=== R series: Radio phones (2008) ===
Phone model	Screen type	Released	S	Technology	Form factor	Camera
Sony Ericsson R300	Color	2008	D	GSM	Candybar	1.3-megapixel
Sony Ericsson R306	Color	2008	D	GSM	Clamshell	1.3-megapixel

=== S series: Style / slider / swivel phones (2004–2009) ===
Phone model	Screen type	Released	S	Technology	Form factor	Camera
Sony Ericsson S302	Color	2008	D	GSM	Candybar	2-megapixel
Sony Ericsson S312	Color	2009	D	GSM	Candybar	2-megapixel
Sony Ericsson S500	Color	2007	D	GSM	Slider	2-megapixel
Sony Ericsson S600	Color	2005	D	GSM	Swivel	1.3-megapixel
Sony Ericsson S700	Color	2004	D	GSM	Swivel	1.3-megapixel
Sony Ericsson S710	Color	2005	D	GSM	Swivel	1.3-megapixel

=== T series: Tela phones (2002–2009) ===
NOTE: Sony Ericsson may release cell phones in one variants, indicated with a letter after the model number. For example, Sony Ericsson t303 released in China was released as Sony Ericsson t303c.

Phone model	Screen type	Released	S	Technology	Form factor	Camera
Sony Ericsson T68i	Color	2002	D	GSM	Candybar	Accessory (MCA-25 CommuniCam)
Sony Ericsson T100	Monochrome	2002	D	GSM	Candybar	None
Sony Ericsson T105	Monochrome	2002	D	GSM	Candybar	None
Sony Ericsson T200	Monochrome	2002	D	GSM	Candybar	Accessory
Sony Ericsson T206	Monochrome	2003	D	CDMA, AMPS	Candybar	None
Sony Ericsson T230	Color	2003	D	GSM	Candybar	None
Sony Ericsson T250	Color	2007	D	GSM	Candybar	VGA
Sony Ericsson T270	Color	2008	D	GSM	Candybar	None
Sony Ericsson T280	Color	2008	D	GSM	Candybar	1.3-megapixel
Sony Ericsson T290	Color	2004	D	GSM	Candybar	Accessory
Sony Ericsson T300	Color	2002	D	GSM	Candybar	Accessory
Sony Ericsson T303	Color	2008	D	GSM	Slider	1.3-megapixel
Sony Ericsson T310	Color	2003	D	GSM	Candybar	None
Sony Ericsson T600	Monochrome	2002	D	GSM	Candybar	None
Sony Ericsson T606	Color	2003	D	CDMA, AMPS	Candybar	Accessory
Sony Ericsson T608	Color	2003	D	CDMA, AMPS	Candybar	Accessory
Sony Ericsson T610	Color	2003	D	GSM	Candybar	CIF
Sony Ericsson T630	Color	2004	D	GSM	Candybar	VGA
Sony Ericsson T650	Color	2007	D	GSM, UMTS	Candybar	3.2-megapixel
Sony Ericsson T700	Color	2008	D	GSM, UMTS	Candybar	3.2-megapixel
Sony Ericsson T707	Color	2009	D	GSM, UMTS	Clamshell	3.2-megapixel
Sony Ericsson T715	Color	2009	D	GSM, UMTS	Slider	3.2-megapixel

=== V series: Vodafone phones (2004–2007) ===
Phone model	Screen type	Released	S	Technology	Form factor	Camera
Sony Ericsson V600	Color	2005	D	GSM, UMTS	Candybar	1.3-megapixel
Sony Ericsson V630	Color	2006	D	GSM, UMTS	Candybar	2-megapixel
Sony Ericsson V640	Color	2007	D	GSM, UMTS	Candybar	2-megapixel
Sony Ericsson V800	Color	2005	D	GSM, UMTS	Clamshell	1.3-megapixel

=== W series: Walkman phones (2005–2011) ===
Phone model	Screen type	Released	S	Technology	Form factor	Camera
Sony Ericsson W200	Color	2007	D	GSM	Candybar	VGA
Sony Ericsson W205	Color	2009	D	GSM	Slider	1.3-megapixel
Sony Ericsson W300	Color	2006	D	GSM	Clamshell	VGA
Sony Ericsson W302	Color	2008	D	GSM	Candybar	2-megapixel
Sony Ericsson W350	Color	2008	D	GSM	Clamshell	1.3-megapixel
Sony Ericsson W380	Color	2007	D	GSM	Clamshell	1.3-megapixel
Sony Ericsson W395	Color	2009	D	GSM	Slider	2-megapixel
Sony Ericsson W508	Color	2009	D	GSM, UMTS, HSDPA	Clamshell	3.2-megapixel
Sony Ericsson W550/W600	Color	2005	D	GSM	Swivel	1.3-megapixel
Sony Ericsson W580	Color	2007	D	GSM	Slider	2-megapixel
Sony Ericsson W595	Color	2008	D	GSM, UMTS, HSDPA	Slider	3.2-megapixel
Sony Ericsson W610	Color	2007	D	GSM	Candybar	2-megapixel
Sony Ericsson W660	Color	2007	D	GSM	Candybar	2-megapixel
Sony Ericsson W700	Color	2006	D	GSM	Candybar	2-megapixel
Sony Ericsson W705	Color	2009	D	GSM, UMTS HSDPA	Slider	3.2-megapixel
Sony Ericsson W710	Color	2006	D	GSM	Clamshell	2-megapixel
Sony Ericsson W715	Color	2009	D	GSM, UMTS HSDPA	Slider	3.2-megapixel
Sony Ericsson W760	Color	2008	D	GSM, UMTS	Slider	3.2-megapixel
Sony Ericsson W800	Color	2005	D	GSM	Candybar	2-megapixel
Sony Ericsson W810	Color	2006	D	GSM	Candybar	2-megapixel
Sony Ericsson W830	Color	2006	D	GSM	Slider	2-megapixel
Sony Ericsson W850	Color	2006	D	GSM, UMTS	Slider	2-megapixel
Sony Ericsson W880	Color	2007	D	GSM, UMTS	Candybar	2-megapixel
Sony Ericsson W890	Color	2008	D	GSM, UMTS	Candybar	3.2-megapixel
Sony Ericsson W900	Color	2006	D	GSM, UMTS	swivel	2-megapixel
Sony Ericsson W902	Color	2008	D	GSM,	Candybar	5-megapixel
Sony Ericsson W910	Color	2008	D	GSM, HSDPA	Slider	2-megapixel
**Sony Ericsson W950**	Color	2007	D	GSM, UMTS	Candybar	None
**Sony Ericsson W960**	Color	2007	D	GSM, UMTS	Candybar	3.2-megapixel
Sony Ericsson W980	Color	2008	D	GSM, HSDPA	Clamshell	3.2-megapixel
Sony Ericsson W995	Color	2009	D	GSM, HSDPA	Slider	8.1-megapixel
Sony Ericsson W100 (Spiro)	Color	2010	D	GSM	Slider	2-megapixel
Sony Ericsson W20 (Zylo)	Color	2010	D	GSM, HSDPA	Slider	3.2-megapixel
Sony Ericsson W150 (Yendo/Yizo)	Color	2010	D	GSM, HSDPA	Touch	2-megapixel
Sony Ericsson WT13 Mix Walkman	Color	2011	D	GSM, HSDPA	Touch	3.2-megapixel
Sony Ericsson WT19 Live	Color	2011	D	GSM, HSDPA	Touch	5-megapixel

NOTE: Sony Ericsson may release cell phones in three variants, indicated with a letter after the model number. Example: W200 was released as W200a (for the Americas), W200c (for China) and W200i (rest of the world). The default release letter for most models is "i" which means international.

=== X series: Xperia phones (2008–2011) ===
Some phones are part of Sony Ericsson's "Greenheart" range.

Phone model	Screen type	Released	S	Technology	Form factor	Camera	Carrier(s)	OS
Sony Ericsson Xperia X1	Color	2008	D	GSM, UMTS	Slider	3.2-megapixel		Windows Mobile 6.0
Sony Ericsson Xperia X2	Color	2009	D	GSM	Slider	8.1-megapixel		Windows Mobile 6.5
Sony Ericsson Xperia X8	Color	2010	D	GSM	Touchscreen	3.2-megapixel		Upgradable Android 1.6-2.1
Sony Ericsson Xperia X10	Color	2010	D	GSM, UMTS	Touchscreen	8.1-megapixel with HD video recording	NTT docomo	Upgradable Android 2.1
Sony Ericsson Xperia X10 mini	Color	2010	D	GSM, UMTS	Touchscreen	5-megapixel		Upgradable Android 1.6-2.1
Sony Ericsson Xperia mini	Color	2011	D	GSM, UMTS	Touchscreen	5-megapixel with HD video recording and ExmorR shooting		2.3-4.0.4
Sony Ericsson Xperia X10 mini pro	Color	2010	D	GSM, UMTS	Slider	5-megapixel		Upgradable Android 1.6
Sony Ericsson Xperia mini pro	Color	2011	D	GSM, UMTS	Slider	5-megapixel with HD video recording and ExmorR shooting		2.3-4.0.4
Sony Ericsson Xperia arc	Color	2011	D	GSM, UMTS	Touchscreen	8-megapixel with HD video recording and ExmorR shooting	NTT docomo	Android 2.3-4.0.4
Sony Ericsson Xperia arc S	Color	2011	D	GSM, UMTS	Touchscreen	8-megapixel with HD video recording and ExmorR shooting	NTT docomo	Android 2.3-4.0.4
Sony Ericsson Xperia PLAY	Color	2011	D	GSM, UMTS, CDMA (for Verizon Wireless)	Touchscreen	5-megapixel	Verizon Wireless (CDMA version)	Android 2.3-4.0.4
Sony Ericsson Xperia neo	Color	2011	D	GSM, UMTS	Touchscreen	8-megapixel with HD video recording and ExmorR shooting		Android 2.3-4.0.4
Sony Ericsson Xperia neo V	Color	2011	D	GSM, UMTS	Touchscreen	5-megapixel with HD video recording		Android 2.3-4.0.4
Sony Ericsson Xperia pro	Color	2011	D	GSM, UMTS	Slider	8-megapixel with HD video recording and ExmorR shooting		Android 2.3-4.0.4
Sony Ericsson Xperia ray	Color	2011	D	GSM, UMTS	Touchscreen	8-megapixel with HD video recording and ExmorR shooting		Android 2.3-4.0.4
Sony Ericsson Xperia active	Color	2011	D	GSM, UMTS	Touchscreen	5-megapixel with HD video recording and ExmorR shooting		Android 2.3-4.0.4

=== Z series: Clamshell phones (2003–2008) ===
Phone model	Screen type	Released	S	Technology	Form factor	Camera
Sony Ericsson Z200	Color	2003	D	GSM	Clamshell	None
Sony Ericsson Z250	Color	2007	D	GSM	Clamshell	VGA
Sony Ericsson Z300	Color	2006	D	GSM	Clamshell	1.2-megapixel
Sony Ericsson Z310	Color	2007	D	GSM	Clamshell	VGA
Sony Ericsson Z320	Color	2007	D	GSM	Clamshell	1.3-megapixel
Sony Ericsson Z500	Color	2005	D	GSM	Clamshell	VGA
Sony Ericsson Z510	Color	2007	D	GSM	Clamshell	2.0-megapixel
Sony Ericsson Z520	Color	2005	D	GSM	Clamshell	VGA but extended to 0.9 MP in camera options.
Sony Ericsson Z525a	Color	2005	D	GSM	Clamshell	VGA
Sony Ericsson Z530	Color	2006	D	GSM	Clamshell	VGA
Sony Ericsson Z550	Color	2007	D	GSM	Clamshell	1.3-megapixel
Sony Ericsson Z555	Color	2007	D	GSM	Clamshell	1.3-megapixel
Sony Ericsson Z558	Color/Touch	2007	D	GSM	Clamshell	1.3-megapixel
Sony Ericsson Z600	Color	2003	D	GSM	Clamshell	CIF
Sony Ericsson Z610	Color	2006	D	GSM, UMTS	Clamshell	2-megapixel
Sony Ericsson Z700	Color	2004		GSM	Clamshell	None
Sony Ericsson Z710	Color	2006	D	GSM	Clamshell	2-megapixel
Sony Ericsson Z750	Color	2007	D	GSM, UMTS	Clamshell	2-megapixel
Sony Ericsson Z770	Color	2008	D	GSM, HSDPA	Clamshell	2-megapixel
Sony Ericsson Z780	Color	2008	D	GSM, HSDPA	Clamshell	2-megapixel
Sony Ericsson Z800	Color	2005	D	GSM, UMTS	Clamshell	1.3-megapixel
Sony Ericsson Z1010	Color	2003	D	GSM, UMTS	Clamshell	2xVGA

=== Entertainment Unlimited series: Entertainment phones (2009–2010) ===
The first Entertainment Unlimited phones were announced and launched in 2009, creating a new category where the benefits of audio and images were "combined in smart, good-looking and high-performing devices." Apart from first-rate audio-visual strength, what these products have in common are differentiating factors in the user interface, borrowing from the wider Sony Group UI-developments. Aino is the first product that connects into the world of the Sony PlayStation remotely via remote media play. Vivaz is the first Sony Ericsson phone supporting high-definition (HD) video capture.

Phone model	Screen type	Released	S	Technology	Form factor	Camera	OS
**Sony Ericsson Satio**	Color	2009	D	GSM, HSPA	Touchscreen	12.1-megapixel	Symbian^1(S60v5)
Sony Ericsson Aino	Color	2009	D	GSM, HSPA	Slider	8.1-megapixel	A200
Sony Ericsson Yari	Color	2009	D	GSM, HSPA	Slider	5-megapixel	A200
**Sony Ericsson Vivaz**	Color	2010	D	GSM, HSPA	Touchscreen	8-megapixel with HD Recording	Symbian^1(S60v5)
**Sony Ericsson Vivaz Pro**	Color	2010	D	GSM, HSPA	Side-Sliding Qwerty-Equipped Touchscreen	5-megapixel with HD Recording	Symbian^1(S60v5)

=== Greenheart phones (2009–2011) ===
Phone model	Screen type	Released	S	Technology	Form factor	Camera	OS
Sony Ericsson C901 Greenheart	Color	2009	D	GSM, HSPA	Candybar	5-megapixel	
Sony Ericsson Naite	Color	2009	D	GSM, HSPA	Candybar	2-megapixel	
Sony Ericsson Cedar	Color	2010	D	GSM, HSPA	Candybar	2-megapixel	
Sony Ericsson Elm	Color	2010	D	GSM, HSPA	Candybar	5-megapixel	
Sony Ericsson Hazel	Color	2010	D	GSM, HSPA	Slider	5-megapixel	
**Sony Ericsson Aspen**	Color	2010	D	GSM, HSPA	QWERTY/Touch	3-megapixel	Windows Mobile 6.5.3
**Sony Ericsson Xperia neo**	Color	2011	D	GSM, UMTS	Touchscreen	8-megapixel	Android 2.3
**Sony Ericsson Xperia mini**	Color	2011	D	GSM, UMTS	Touchscreen	5-megapixel	Android 2.3
**Sony Ericsson Xperia mini pro**	Color	2011	D	GSM, UMTS	Touchscreen	5-megapixel	Android 2.3
**Sony Ericsson Xperia pro**	Color	2011	D	GSM, UMTS	Touchscreen	8-megapixel	Android 2.3

== Overview ==
Note: These lists are not intended to be all inclusive. Some information may be missing, or out of date.

Main series	Model	Intro date	Type	Notable features
C (Cybershot)	C510	2009, January	Candybar	Smile Shutter technology; 30 frame/s video recording in QVGA format; Blogger & Facebook integrated; runs Windows Live Messenger; SE Java Platform 8; scratch-resistant display; built in photo editor; can work as a modem
C (Cybershot)	C702	2008, February	Candybar	IP54 certified
C (Cybershot)	C901	2009, May	Candybar	5 MP camera with xenon flash; Smile Shutter technology; environmentally friendly Greenheart series
C (Cybershot)	C902	2008, February	Candybar	Featured in Quantum of Solace
C (Cybershot)	C903	2009, February	Slider Phone	GPS; TV-Out
C (Cybershot)	C905	2008, June	Slider Phone	8.1 MP camera (xenon flash); GPS; TV-out; originally flagship phone of C series

== Features ==
Main series	Model	Size/weight	Battery	Camera	Networks	Input	Memory	Multimedia
C (Cybershot)	C510	107×47×12.5 mm 92g	BST-38 Standard battery, 3.6V Li-Po 930mAh/3.3Wh	3.2 MP	GSM, GPRS, EDGE, UMTS, HSPA	Keypad	Up to 100 MB	MP3, MP4, AAC, 3GPP
C (Cybershot)	C702	106×48×16 mm 105g	BST-33 LiPo battery, 3.6V Li-Po 950mAh	3.2 MP	GSM, GPRS, EDGE, UMTS, HSPA	Keypad	Up to 160 MB	MP3, MP4, AAC, 3GPP
C (Cybershot)	C901	105×45×13 mm 107g	BST-33 LiPo battery, 3.6V Li-Po 950mAh	5 MP	GSM, GPRS, EDGE, UMTS, HSPA	Keypad	Up to 110 MB	MP3, MP4, AAC, 3GPP
C (Cybershot)	C902	108×49×11 mm 107g	Li-Po	5 MP	GSM, GPRS, EDGE, UMTS, HSPA	Keypad	Up to 160 MB	MP3, MP4, AAC, 3GPP
C (Cybershot)	C903	97×49×16 mm 96g	Li-Po	5 MP	GSM, GPRS, EDGE, UMTS, HSPA	Keypad	Up to 130 MB	MP3, AAC, MP4, 3GPP
C (Cybershot)	C905	104×49×18mm 136g	Li-Po	8.1 MP	GSM, GPRS, EDGE, UMTS, HSPA	Keypad	Up to 160 MB	MP3, AAC, MP4, 3GPP

Main series	Model	Connectivity	3G/related	Messaging	Browser	Radio	GPS	other features
C (Cybershot)	C510	Bluetooth, USB	3G, HSDPA, GPRS	SMS, IM, Email, MMS	HTML	Yes with RDS	NO	
C (Cybershot)	C702	Bluetooth, USB	3G, HSDPA, WCDMA, GPRS	SMS, IM, Email, MMS	HTML	Yes with RDS	Yes	
C (Cybershot)	C901	Bluetooth, USB	3G, HSDPA, GPRS	SMS, IM, Email, MMS	HTML	Yes with RDS	NO	xenon flash
C (Cybershot)	C902	Bluetooth, USB	3G, HSDPA, GPRS	SMS, IM, Email, MMS	HTML	Yes with RDS	NO	has capacitive touch buttons on side of display
C (Cybershot)	C903	Bluetooth, USB	3G, HSDPA, GPRS	SMS, IM, Email, MMS	HTML	Yes with RDS	Yes	TV-Out
C (Cybershot)	C905	Bluetooth, USB	3G, HSDPA, GPRS, Wi-Fi	SMS, IM, Email, MMS	HTML	Yes with RDS	Yes	Wi-Fi; xenon flash; TV-Out

== Sony Ericsson mobile phones for Japan market ==
=== au by KDDI (previously as IDO and DDI Cellular) ===
Walkman Phone, Xmini (W65S) and W61S

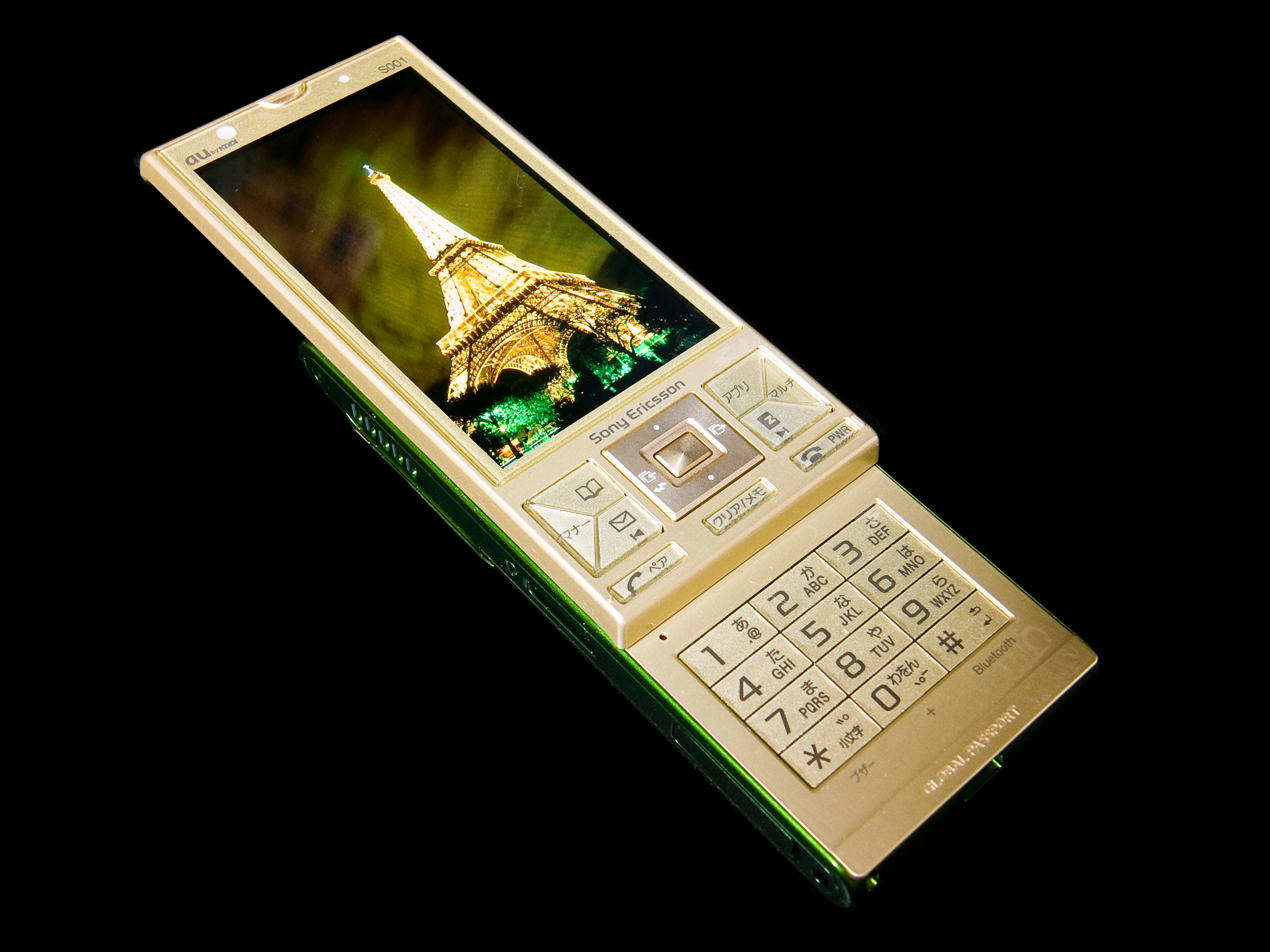
S001

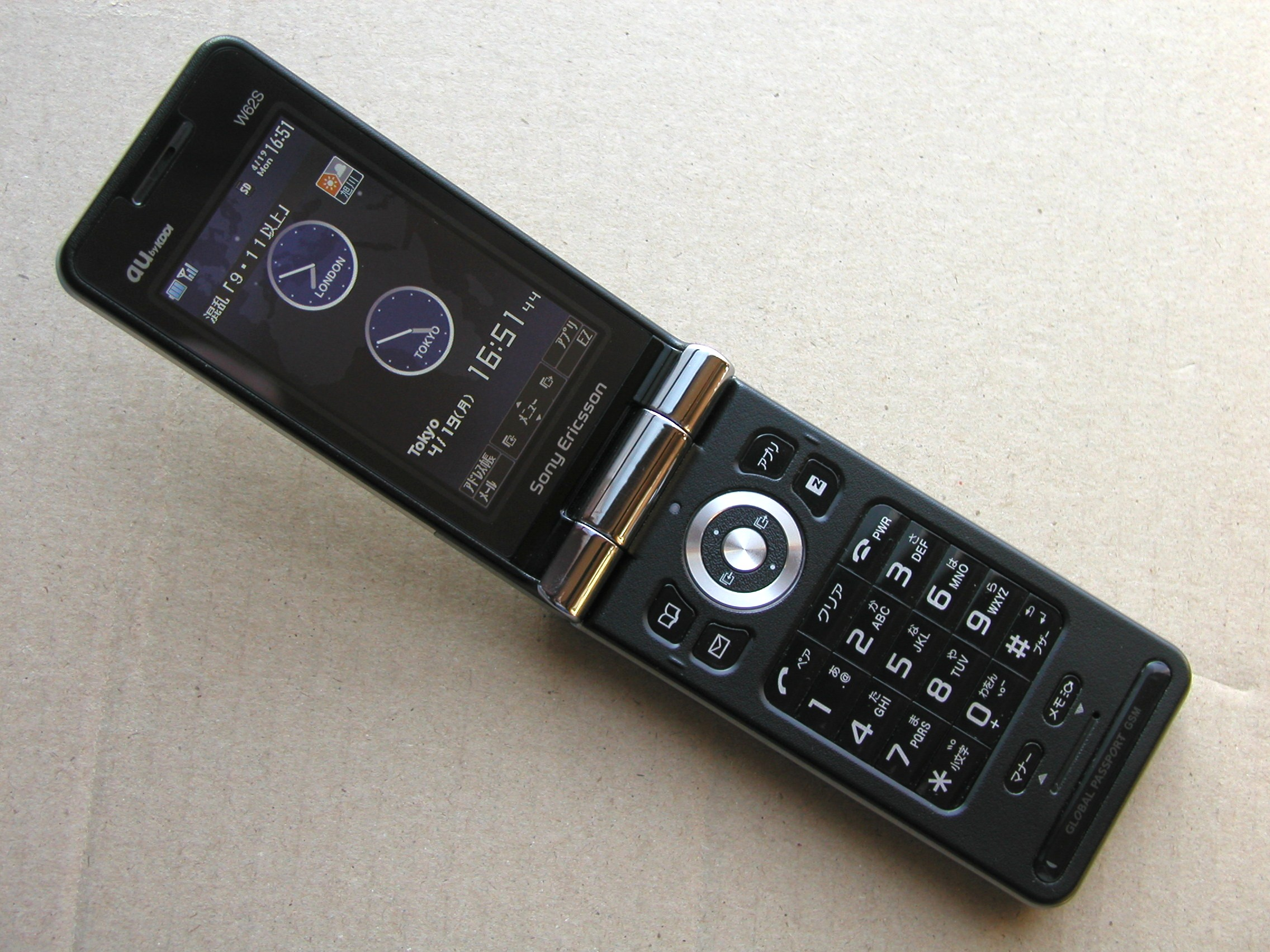
W62S

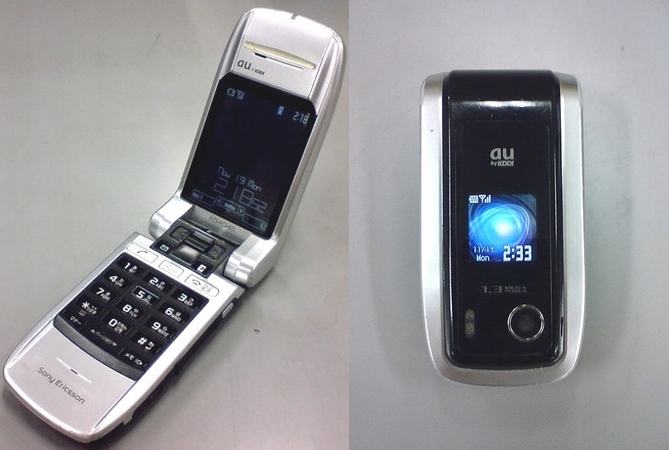
A5404S

- CDMA 1X WIN models (CDMA2000 1xEV-DO)
  - Cyber-shot Keitai S006 - The world's first 16.2-megapixel cameraphone with advanced functions. It features CMOS 'Exmor R' sensor, dual LED flash, ISO 12800, WIN HIGH SPEED service, and waterproof design. It also supports GLOBAL PASSPORT GSM & CDMA.
  - BRAVIA Phone S005 - Its design is similar to S004. It supports WIN HIGH SPEED service.
  - URBANO MOND - Designed for active elderly with updated functions and waterproof design.
  - BRAVIA Phone S004 - High-speed waterproof phone from Sony Ericsson BRAVIA lineup using 1 GHz Qualcomm Snapdragon processor. It features OneSeg TV tuner, Motion Flow Lite 60 frame, 8.11-megapixel CMOS camera and supports GLOBAL PASSPORT GSM & CDMA.
  - Cyber-shot Keitai S003 - The first 12.09-megapixel 'Exmor' CMOS cameraphone from Sony Ericsson Cyber-shot lineup with Dual-LED 'PLASMA' Flash and waterproof body. It supports GLOBAL PASSPORT GSM & CDMA.
  - URBANO BARONE - Designed for active elderly with large keypad function. It supports GLOBAL PASSPORT CDMA.
  - BRAVIA Phone U1 - The first BRAVIA phone for au's lineup with waterproof body. It supports GLOBAL PASSPORT CDMA.
  - Global Keitai S002 - Compact, simple phone with GLOBAL PASSPORT GSM support and Talkman Flash feature.
  - Cyber-shot Keitai S001 - Cyber-shot phone with 'First-Class' theme and it is the first Sony Ericsson phone using AMOLED display. It features 8.11-megapixel 'Exmor' CMOS sensor, GLOBAL PASSPORT GSM & CDMA, and premium design.
  - Walkman Phone, Premier³ - Walkman phone which able to rip music directly from CD Player via connector. It features Clear Bass, Clear Stereo, and Sony's DSEE (Digital Sound Enhancement Engine) Technology. It supports GLOBAL PASSPORT CDMA.
  - Walkman Phone, Xmini (W65S) - The smallest Walkman phone with illumination music control. It features Clear Bass, Clear Stereo, and Sony's DSEE (Digital Sound Enhancement Engine) Technology.
  - Global Keitai W64S - Global and elegance design with GLOBAL PASSPORT GSM support and Talkman Flash feature.
  - Full Change Keitai re (W63S) - The first Sony Ericsson phone with full-customization support both cover, keypad, antenna, and user-interface.
  - Global Keitai W62S - Global design with GLOBAL PASSPORT GSM support and Talkman Flash feature.
  - Cyber-shot Keitai W61S - The first Cyber-shot phone for au's lineup. It features 5.11-megapixel 'Exmor' CMOS sensor, Smile Shutter Lite, Kaokime Lite, and OneSeg TV Tuner.
  - W54S - Stylish and elegance phone with OneSeg TV Tuner and Bluetooth support.
  - W53S - Stylish phone with selected 100 Style-Up Panel cover.
  - Walkman Keitai W52S - Walkman phone with visual music sensation.
  - W51S - Stylish phone with backlight illumination panel.
  - W44S - 2-way flip multimedia phone with OneSeg TV Tuner support.
  - W43S - Stylish phone with elegance and beauty design.
  - Walkman Keitai W42S - Walkman phone with music style design and illumination music control.
  - W41S - Music-style phone which able to connect to LISMO!
  - W32S - Style-phone with Osaifu-Keitai support.
  - W31S - Multimedia phone designed for music.
  - W21S - The first CDMA 1X WIN model from Sony Ericsson.

- CDMA2000 1x models

  - A1404S II
  - A1404S
  - A1402S II
  - A1402S
  - A5404S
  - A5402S
  - A1301S
  - A1101S
  - A3014S

- cdmaOne models

  - C1002S
  - C413S (Sony)
  - C406S (Sony)
  - C404S DIVA / DIVA lite (Sony)
  - C305S (Sony)
  - C101S (Sony)

- PDC models
  - Digital Minimo 511G (Sony) also called HD-50S
  - Digital Minimo 527G (Sony)
  - Digital Minimo 534G (Sony)
  - Digital Minimo 604G (Sony)
  - Digital Minimo 705G (Sony) also called D306S
- TACS model
  - TACS Minimo T206 (Sony)

=== NTT DoCoMo ===
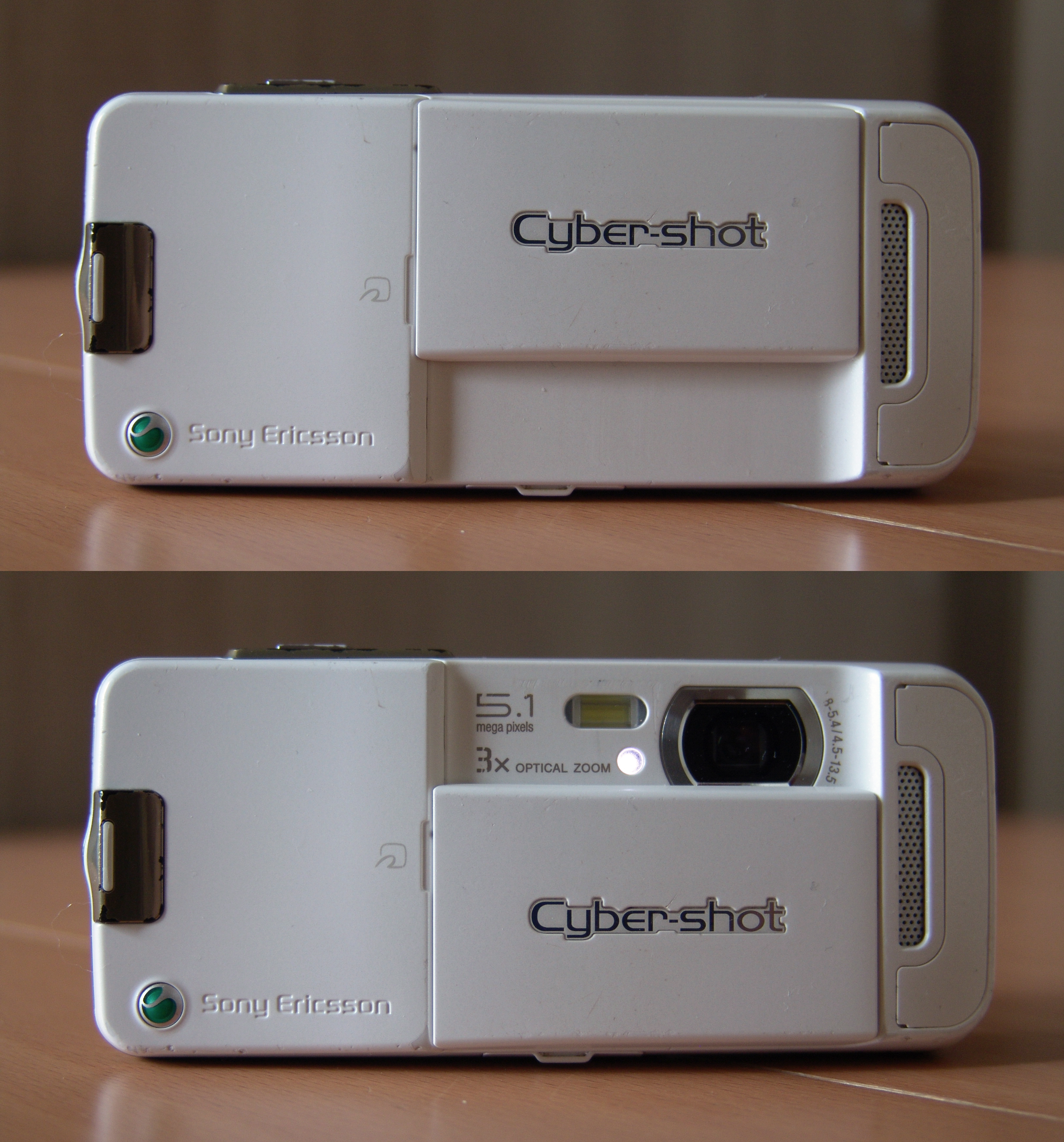
SO905iCS

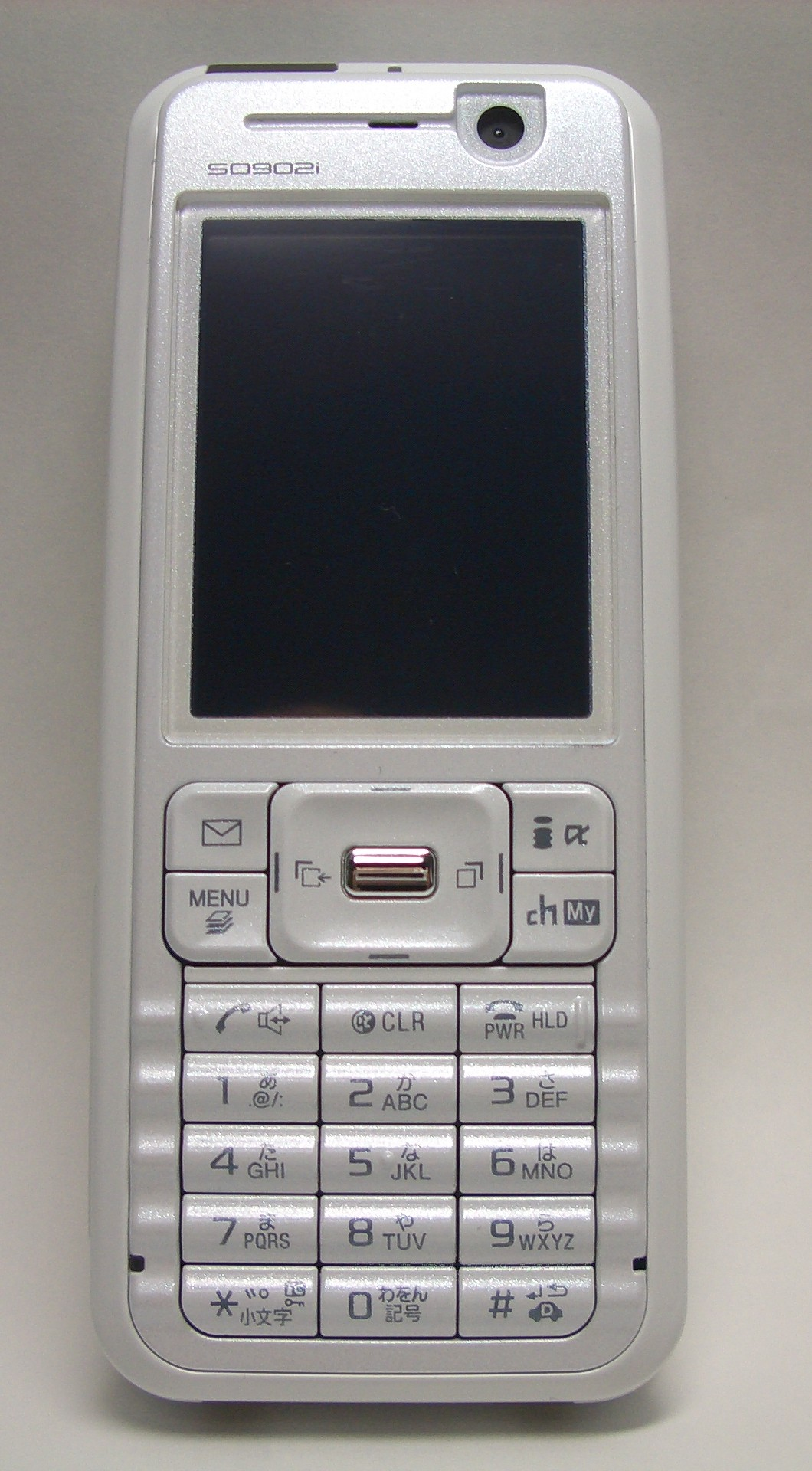
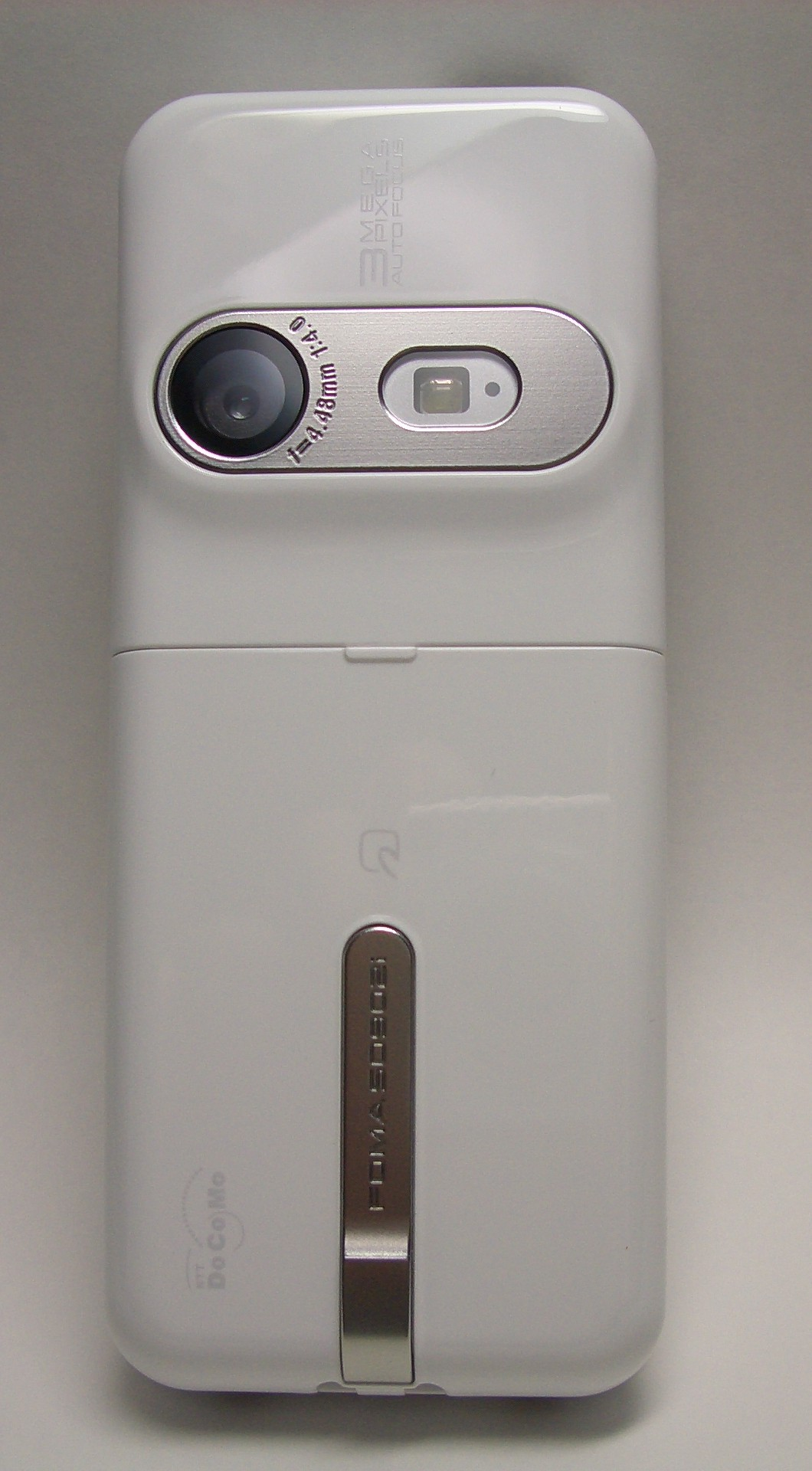
SO902i
- FOMA models
  - Xperia SO-01B - Sony Ericsson Xperia X10 for Japanese market. It features additional functions like Sony's music store mora touch.
  - Global Keitai SO706i - Global elegance phone with illumination panel. It uses Linux MOAP(L) operating system and supports WORLD WING 3G.
  - BRAVIA Keitai SO906i - Second BRAVIA(R) phone for Docomo's lineup.
  - SO705i - Smart elegance phone with illumination panel. It uses Linux MOAP(L) operating system.
  - Cyber-shot Keitai SO905iCS - The first Cyber-shot phone for Docomo's lineup. It features 5.11-megapixel 'Exmor' CMOS camera, Smile Shutter Lite, Kaokime Lite, and Xenon Flash.
  - SO905i - Multimedia phone with touchscreen function.
  - SO704i - Stylish phone with illumination panel on the cover.
  - BRAVIA Keitai SO903iTV - The first Sony Ericsson phone with BRAVIA branded.
  - Aroma Keitai SO703i - Beauty and elegance phone with replaceable aroma sheet in the front cover.
  - SO903i - Premium AV multimedia phone from Sony Ericsson for Docomo's lineup.
  - FOMASTICK SO902iWP+ - Waterproof phone from Sony Ericsson for Docomo's lineup.
  - SO702i - Stylish phone with selected Style-Up Panel cover.
  - FOMASTICK SO902i - Candybar model with 3.2-megapixel CMOS camera.

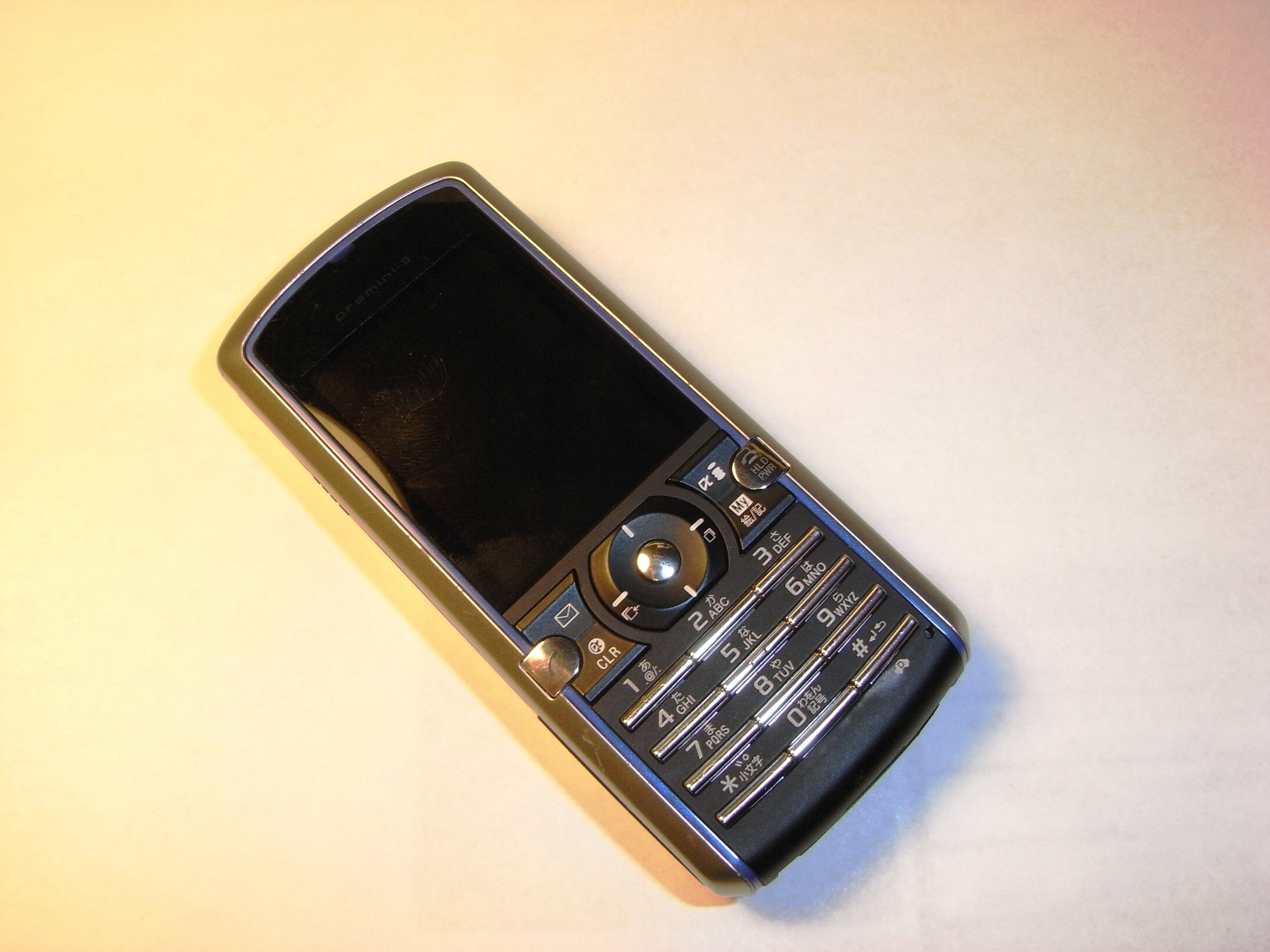
SO506i

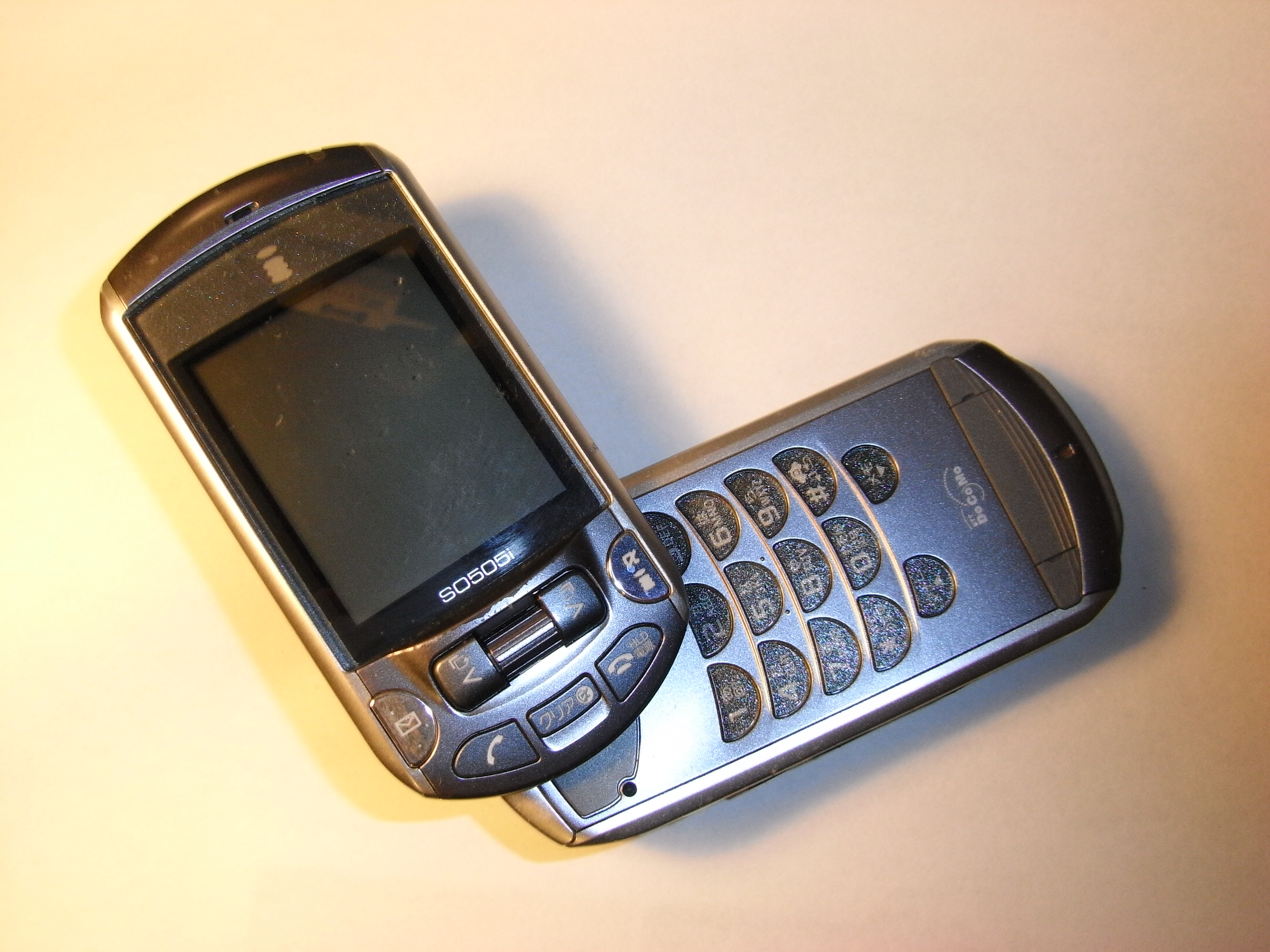
SO505i

- mova models
  - RADIDEN (SO213iWR) - The first Sony Ericsson radiophone with AM/FM/TV band and dual-design.
  - premini-IIS (SO506iS) - One of premini series with improved features and fresh design.
  - premini-II (SO506i) - One of premini series with Memory Stick Duo support.
  - premini-S (SO213iS) - One of premini series with sporty design. It doesn't have external memory slot.
  - SO506iC - The first Sony Ericsson phone for Docomo's mova lineup with electronic payment Osaifu-Keitai function using Sony FeliCa chip.
  - premini (SO213i) - The first and smallest, compact premini model from Sony Ericsson. It doesn't have external memory slot.
  - SO505iS - Swivel music phone from Sony Ericsson for Docomo's mova lineup
  - SO505i - Swivel multimedia phone from Sony Ericsson for Docomo's mova lineup. It is almost similar to global model S700i.
  - SO212i
  - SO504i
  - SO211i
  - SO503iS (Sony)
  - SO210i (Sony)
  - SO503i (Sony)
  - ER209i (Ericsson)
  - SO502iWM (Sony)
  - SO502i (Sony)
  - SO601ps (Sony)
  - ER207 (Ericsson)
  - SO207 (Sony)
  - ER205 (Ericsson)
  - SO206 (Sony)
  - SO201 (Sony)
  - SO101 (Sony)

=== SoftBank Mobile (previously as Vodafone and J-Phone) ===
- UMTS model
  - Vodafone 802SE - Vodafone Japan version of the V800
- PDC model
  - J-SY01 (Sony)

=== TU-KA ===
- PDC models

  - TH291 (Sony) also called SO4
  - TH281 (Sony) also called SO3
  - TH271 (Sony) also called SO2 or Y202
  - TH261 (Sony) also called SO or Y201
  - TH251 (Sony)
  - TH241 (Sony)

== Sony Ericsson Japan phones ==
Phone model	Released	Technology	Form factor	Camera	Carrier	OS
Sony Ericsson XPERIA acro HD IS12S	2012	CDMA 1X WIN. GSM	Waterproof Slate	CMOS "Exmor R" 12.1-megapixel	au	Android OS Ver.2.3 (Gingerbread)
Sony Ericsson XPERIA acro HD SO-03D	2012	FOMA, GSM	Waterproof Slate	CMOS "Exmor R" 12.1-megapixel	docomo	Android OS Ver.2.3 (Gingerbread)
Sony Ericsson XPERIA NX SO-02D	2012	FOMA, GSM	Slate	CMOS "Exmor R" 12.1-megapixel	docomo	Android OS Ver.2.3 (Gingerbread)
Sony Ericsson URBANO AFFARE	2011	CDMA 1X WIN, GSM	Waterproof flip	CMOS "Exmor R" 8.1-megapixel	au	KDDI Common Platform Plus
Sony Ericsson mini S51SE	2011	W-CDMA, GSM	Slate	CMOS 5-megapixel	EMOBILE	Android OS Ver.2.3 (Gingerbread)
Sony Ericsson XPERIA PLAY SO-01D	2011	FOMA, GSM	Slide	CMOS 5-megapixel	docomo	Android OS Ver.2.3 (Gingerbread)
Sony Ericsson XPERIA ray SO-03C	2011	FOMA, GSM	Slate	CMOS "Exmor R" 8.1-megapixel	docomo	Android OS Ver.2.3 (Gingerbread)
Sony Ericsson XPERIA acro SO-02C	2011	FOMA, GSM	Slate	CMOS "Exmor R" 8.1-megapixel	docomo	Android OS Ver.2.3 (Gingerbread)
Sony Ericsson XPERIA acro IS11S	2011	CDMA 1X WIN, GSM	Slate	CMOS "Exmor R" 8.1-megapixel	au	Android OS Ver.2.3 (Gingerbread)
Sony Ericsson S007	2011	CDMA 1X WIN, GSM	Waterproof flip	CMOS "Exmor R" 16.2-megapixel	au	KDDI Common Platform Plus
Sony Ericsson XPERIA arc SO-01C	2011	FOMA, GSM	Slate	CMOS "Exmor R" 8.1-megapixel	docomo	Android OS Ver.2.3 (Gingerbread)
Sony Ericsson iida G11	2011	CDMA 1X WIN, GSM	Waterproof Slide	CMOS 8.1-megapixel	au	KDDI Common Platform Plus
Sony Ericsson Cyber-shot Phone S006	2010	CDMA 1X WIN, GSM	Waterproof Slide	CMOS "Exmor R" 16.2-megapixel	au	KDDI Common Platform Plus
Sony Ericsson BRAVIA Phone S005	2010	CDMA 1X WIN, GSM	Waterproof 2-way flip	CMOS 8.1-megapixel	au	KDDI Common Platform Plus
Sony Ericsson URBANO MOND	2010	CDMA 1X WIN, GSM	Waterproof flip	CMOS 8.1-megapixel	au	KDDI Common Platform Plus
Sony Ericsson BRAVIA Phone S004	2010	CDMA 1X WIN, GSM	Waterproof 2-way flip	CMOS 8.1-megapixel	au	KDDI Common Platform Plus
Sony Ericsson Cyber-shot Phone S003	2010	CDMA 1X WIN, GSM	Waterproof Slide	CMOS "Exmor" 12.1-megapixel	au	KDDI Common Platform Plus
Sony Ericsson XPERIA SO-01B	2010	FOMA, GSM	Slate	CMOS 8.1-megapixel	docomo	Android OS Ver.1.6 (Donut), Android OS Ver.2.1 (Eclair)
Sony Ericsson URBANO BARONE	2009	CDMA 1X WIN	Flip	CMOS 5.1-megapixel	au	KDDI Common Platform Plus
Sony Ericsson BRAVIA Phone U1	2009	CDMA 1X WIN	Waterproof 2-way flip	CMOS 5.1-megapixel	au	KDDI Common Platform Plus
Sony Ericsson S002	2009	CDMA 1X WIN, GSM	Flip	CMOS 3.2-megapixel	au	REX OS + KDDI Common Platform
Sony Ericsson iida G9	2009	CDMA 1X WIN, GSM	Flip	CMOS 3.2-megapixel	au	KDDI Common Platform Plus
Sony Ericsson Cyber-shot Phone S001	2009	CDMA 1X WIN, GSM	Slide	CMOS "Exmor" 8.1-megapixel	au	KDDI Common Platform Plus
Sony Ericsson Walkman Phone, Premier³	2009	CDMA 1X WIN	2-way flip	CMOS 3.2-megapixel	au	KDDI Common Platform Plus
Sony Ericsson Walkman Phone, Xmini	2008	CDMA 1X WIN	Slide	Not Available	au	KDDI Common Platform Plus
Sony Ericsson W64S	2008	CDMA 1X WIN, GSM	Flip	CMOS 3.2-megapixel	au	REX OS + KDDI Common Platform
Sony Ericsson re	2008	CDMA 1X WIN	Flip	CMOS 3.2-megapixel	au	KDDI Common Platform Plus
Sony Ericsson SO706i	2008	FOMA, GSM	Flip	CMOS 2.0-megapixel	docomo	Linux + MOAP(L)
Sony Ericsson BRAVIA Phone SO906i	2008	FOMA, GSM	Flip	CMOS 3.2-megapixel	docomo	Symbian OS Ver.9.3 + MOAP(S)
Sony Ericsson W62S	2008	CDMA 1X WIN, GSM	Flip	CMOS 2.0-megapixel	au	REX OS + KDDI Common Platform
Sony Ericsson Cyber-shot Phone W61S	2008	CDMA 1X WIN	Slide	CMOS "Exmor" 5.1-megapixel	au	KDDI Common Platform Plus
Sony Ericsson SO705i	2008	FOMA	Flip	CMOS 2.0-megapixel	docomo	Linux + MOAP(L)
Sony Ericsson Cyber-shot Phone SO905iCS	2008	FOMA, GSM	Slide	CMOS "Exmor" 5.1-megapixel	docomo	Symbian OS Ver.9.3 + MOAP(S)
Sony Ericsson W54S	2008	CDMA 1X WIN	Flip	CMOS 3.2-megapixel	au	KDDI Common Platform Plus
Sony Ericsson SO905i	2007	FOMA, GSM	Flip	CMOS 3.2-megapixel	docomo	Symbian OS Ver.9.3 + MOAP(S)
Sony Ericsson W53S	2007	CDMA 1X WIN	Flip	CMOS 2.0-megapixel	au	REX OS + KDDI Common Platform
Sony Ericsson Walkman Phone W52S	2007	CDMA 1X WIN	Slide	CMOS 2.0-megapixel	au	REX OS + KDDI Common Platform
Sony Ericsson SO704i	2007	FOMA	Flip	CMOS 2.0-megapixel	docomo	Symbian OS Ver.8.1 + MOAP(S)
Sony Ericsson BRAVIA Phone SO903iTV	2007	FOMA	Flip	CMOS 2.0-megapixel	docomo	Symbian OS Ver.8.1 + MOAP(S)
Sony Ericsson W51S	2007	CDMA 1X WIN	Flip	CMOS 2.0-megapixel	au	REX OS + KDDI Common Platform
Sony Ericsson SO703i	2007	FOMA	Flip	CMOS 2.0-megapixel	docomo	Symbian OS Ver.8.1 + MOAP(S)
Sony Ericsson W44S	2006	CDMA 1X WIN	2-way flip	CMOS 3.2-megapixel	au	REX OS + KDDI Common Platform
Sony Ericsson SO903i	2006	FOMA	Flip	CMOS 3.2-megapixel	docomo	Symbian OS Ver.8.1 + MOAP(S)
Sony Ericsson W43S	2006	CDMA 1X WIN	Flip	CMOS 2.0-megapixel	au	REX OS + KDDI Common Platform
Sony Ericsson Walkman Phone W42S	2006	CDMA 1X WIN	Slide	CMOS 2.0-megapixel	au	REX OS
Sony Ericsson FOMASTICK SO902iWP+	2006	FOMA	Stick	CMOS 1.3-megapixel	docomo	Symbian OS Ver.8.1 + MOAP(S)
Sony Ericsson SO702i	2006	FOMA	Flip	CMOS 1.3-megapixel	docomo	
Sony Ericsson FOMASTICK SO902i	2006	FOMA	Stick	CMOS 3.2-megapixel	docomo	Symbian OS Ver.8.1 + MOAP(S)
Sony Ericsson W41S	2006	CDMA 1X WIN	Flip	CMOS 1.3-megapixel	au	REX OS
Sony Ericsson RADIDEN	2005	mova	Stick	Not Available	docomo	
Sony Ericsson W32S	2005	CDMA 1X WIN	Flip	CMOS 1.3-megapixel	au	REX OS
Sony Ericsson A1404SII	2005	CDMA 1X	Flip	CMOS 0.3-megapixel	au	REX OS
Sony Ericsson premini-IIS	2005	mova	Stick	CCD 1.3-megapixel	docomo	
Sony Ericsson W31S	2005	CDMA 1X WIN	Slide	CMOS 2.0-megapixel	au	REX OS
Sony Ericsson premini-II	2005	mova	Stick	CCD 1.3-megapixel	docomo	
Sony Ericsson A1404S	2005	CDMA 1X	Flip	CMOS 0.3-megapixel	au	REX OS
Sony Ericsson SoftBank 802SE	2004	SoftBank 3G, GSM	Flip	CMOS 1.3-megapixel	SoftBank	
Sony Ericsson premini-S	2004	mova	Stick	Not Available	docomo	
Sony Ericsson A1402SII	2004	CDMA 1X	Flip	CMOS 0.3-megapixel	au	REX OS
Sony Ericsson W21S	2004	CDMA 1X WIN	Flip	CCD 1.3-megapixel	au	REX OS
Sony Ericsson SO506iC	2004	mova	Swivel	CCD 1.3-megapixel	docomo	
Sony Ericsson premini	2004	mova	Stick	Not Available	docomo	
Sony Ericsson A1402S	2004	CDMA 1X	Flip	CMOS 0.3-megapixel	au	REX OS
Sony Ericsson A5404S	2003	CDMA 1X	Flip	CCD 1.3-megapixel	au	REX OS
Sony Ericsson SO505iS	2003	CDMA 1X	Swivel	CCD 1.3-megapixel	docomo	
Sony Ericsson A5402S	2003	CDMA 1X	Flip	CMOS 0.3-megapixel	au	
Sony Ericsson SO505i	2003	mova	Swivel	CCD 1.3-megapixel	docomo	
Sony Ericsson A1301S	2002	CDMA 1X	Flip	CMOS 0.3-megapixel	au	
Sony Ericsson A1101S	2002	CDMA 1X	Flip		au	
Sony Ericsson SO212i	2002	mova	Flip		docomo	
Sony Ericsson A3104S	2002	CDMA 1X	Flip		au	
Sony Ericsson SO504i	2002	mova	Flip		docomo	
Sony Ericsson SO211i	2002	mova	Flip		docomo	
Sony Ericsson C1002S	2001	cdmaOne	Flip		au	

== PC Cards or USB mobile modems ==
- Sony Ericsson GC75e GPRS PC card Modem
- Sony Ericsson GC79 GPRS/802.11b Wireless LAN PC card
- Sony Ericsson GC82 EDGE/GPRS PC card
- Sony Ericsson GC83 EDGE/GPRS PC card
- Sony Ericsson GC85 EDGE/GPRS PC card
- Sony Ericsson GC89 EDGE/GPRS/802.11g Wireless LAN PC card
- Sony Ericsson GC95 UMTS/EDGE/GPRS PC card
- Sony Ericsson GC99 UMTS/EDGE/GPRS/802.11g Wireless LAN PC card
- Sony Ericsson MD300 Mobile Broadband USB Modem HSDPA/UMTS/EDGE/GPRS

== Accessories ==
Note: Lists are incomplete. Some information may be missing.

=== Bluetooth headsets ===
- Sony Ericsson HBH-35
- Sony Ericsson Akono HBH-300
- Sony Ericsson HBH-60
- Sony Ericsson HBH-65
- Sony Ericsson HBH-GV435
- Sony Ericsson Akono HBH-600
- Sony Ericsson Akono HBH-602
- Sony Ericsson Akono HBH-608
- Sony Ericsson HBH-610(a)
- Sony Ericsson Akono HBH-660
- Sony Ericsson Akono HBH-662
- Sony Ericsson HBH-PV700
- Sony Ericsson HBH-PV703
- Sony Ericsson HBH-PV705
- Sony Ericsson HBH-PV708
- Sony Ericsson HBH-PV710
- Sony Ericsson HBH-PV712
- Sony Ericsson HBH-PV715
- Sony Ericsson HBH-PV720
- Sony Ericsson HBH-PV740
- Sony Ericsson HBH-PV770
- Sony Ericsson HBH-IV835
- Sony Ericsson HBH-IV840
- Sony Ericsson HBH-200 (12 character backlit display)
- Sony Ericsson HBH-DS200 (Stereo) (3.5 mm jack)
- Sony Ericsson HBH-DS205 (Stereo) (3.5 mm jack)
- Sony Ericsson HBH-DS220 (Stereo) (3.5 mm jack)
- Sony Ericsson HBH-DS970 (Stereo) (LCD)
- Sony Ericsson HBH-DS980 (Stereo) (OLED display)
- Sony Ericsson MH100 (3.5 mm jack + touch volume control + LED indicator) (bundled with HPM-78 in-ear plugs)
- Sony Ericsson MW600 (3.5 mm jack + touch volume control + OLED display + μUSB + FM) (bundled with HPM-78 in-ear plugs)
- Sony Ericsson VH-110
- Sony Ericsson VH-410
- Sony Ericsson VH-300 (mono)
- Sony Ericsson VH-700 (mono) (noise shield + μUSB)
- Sony Ericsson HBH-IS800

- Note: Sony budget SBH-20 and SBH-54 (OLED) succeeded by screenless SBH-56 (USB-C) are basically successors of MW600 with vibration and NFC-tag.

=== Car-kits (handsfree) ===
- HCA-20 (T28 11pin)
- HCA-200 (T28 11pin)
- HCA-60 (fastport)
- HCB-30 (bluetooth)
- HCB-300 (bluetooth)
- HCB-400 (bluetooth)
- HCB-700 (LCD) (bluetooth)
- HCE-14 (gooseneck microphone) (T28 11pin)
- HCE-24 (gooseneck microphone)
- CHH-300 car headset charger/holder
- HCE-16 (Advanced Music Mute) add-on for HCA-20/200
- HCE-26 (stereo music mute) add-on for HCA-60

sun visor handsfree (bluetooth)

- HCB-100
- HCB-105
- HCB-108
- HCB-120
- HCB-150

HCH-xx phone holder

=== Bluetooth watches ===
- Sony Ericsson MBW-100
- Sony Ericsson MBW-150 Music Edition
- Sony Ericsson MBW-150 Executive Edition
- Sony Ericsson MBW-150 Classic Edition
- Sony Ericsson MBW-200 Contemporary Elegance
- Sony Ericsson MBW-200 Evening Classic
- Sony Ericsson MBW-200 Sparkling Allure
- Sony Ericsson LiveView (MN800) (also included in XP111 Fitness Experience Pack) (Android only!)

=== Speakers ===
==== Bluetooth speakers ====
- MBS-100 stylish bluetooth speaker (with same charging port as HBH-DS205)
- MBS-200 bluetooth speaker (2 watts) with OLED display (uses BST-38 battery inside) (uses fastport charger) (also has 3.5mm input)
- MBS-400 bluetooth stereo speaker set - consists of MBS-200 as primary speaker and MPS-200 as secondary stereo speaker (connected via 3.5mm, no bluetooth, both need power)
- MBS-900 bluetooth speaker with integrated subwoofer (also has 3.5mm input)
- MS-500 waterproof outdoor bluetooth speaker (2xAA battery driven)
- RA3000 Wireless 360 Reality Audio
- RA5000 Wireless 360 Reality Audio High-Resolution Audio

==== Non-bluetooth speakers ====
- MDS-60 desktop stand dock speaker (5 watts RMS) (either driven by battery or wall socket)
- MDS-65 desktop stand dock speaker (either driven by batteries (5xAAA) or wall socket)
- MDS-70 (CPF-MP001) 2.1 audio dock cradle with iR remote control

the following speaker drain their power from fastport (no batteries or wall socked needed):

- MPS-30
- MPS-60
- MPS-70
- MPS-75 portable stereo speaker that attaches to the fast port of Sony Ericsson mobile phones to allow loud music playback.
- MPS-80
- MPS-100
- MAS-100 Zip hard case (splashproof) for phone with integrated speaker
- MS-410 snap-on speaker stand

newer products without fastport:

- MS-430 Portable Media Speaker Stand with 3.5 mm jack and 2xAA batteries
- MS-450 Portable Audio Speakers for X8, X10, X10 Mini Pro only (has 3.5 mm jack but needs special connector for power)
- 3.5mm audio jack adapters for fastport (passive aftermarket cables)

=== Handsfree headsets (cabled) ===
fastport models:

- HPB-10 / HPM-20 / HPS-20 / HPB-20 (mono / mono / mono / stereo) headset for phones with T28 (11pin) connector (e.g. T610/T630/K300)
- HPM-10 stereo headset that includes an MMC card slot to allow the playback of mp3 music files (for 11pin-T28 models)
- HPS-60 mono headset with non-removable jogging earbud (white-blue)
- HPB-60 mono headset with non-removable earbud (silver)
- HPM-60 stereo headset with non-removable earbuds (black)
- HPM-61 stereo headset with non-removable earbuds and clip (gray/silver)
- HPM-62 stereo headset with non-removable earbuds and clip (black)
- HPM-64 stereo headset included with some of the company phones, including a few walkman branded ones. This walkman branded version of this headset is also branded with BassReflex, which is a technology that improves the Bass quality. First headset with 3.5 mm jack to swap headphones. Comes in trendy colors.
- HPM-65 similar to HPM-64, but with jogging earplugs (earbuds which are half in-ear)
- HPM-66 similar to HPM-65, but with regular jogging earbuds - only one color (gray)
- HPM-70 stereo handsfree telephone headset is bundled with many of the company's phones. A microphone, call answer key and 3.5 mm jack to swap headphones are all built-in. Has in-ear plugs.
- HPM-75 fixed up the issues relating to the HPM-70's microphone - that is, when it picked up too much environmental sound - along with an upgrade in audio quality. (Not compatible with <=DB2010 phones e.g. K750, W810, ...)
- HPM-77 similar to HPM-75, also with removable ear plugs.
- HPM-80 stereo handsfree with built-in radio receiver, music controls and an lcd screen used to display current fm radio frequency. (compatible with W900i only).
- HPM-82 stereo handsfree with built-in music controls that is bundled with some of the walkman branded mobile phones.
- HPM-83 stereo (standard) handsfree with neckband.
- HPM-85 full size stereo headphones for Sony ericsson mobile phones. Has same control unit with microphone as HPM-82.
- HPM-88 stereo handsfree with noise cancelling function and non-removable in-ear plugs ( - due to the second microphone being inside one earplug).
- HPM-90 stereo handsfree with OLED display and music navigation.
- HGE-100 stereo handsfree (similar to HPM-82) with GPS built-in.
- MH-300 stereo handsfree with non-removable earbuds - Greenheart series
- MH-907 motion activated stereo handsfree with non-removable in-ear plugs

trrs 4-pole 3.5 mm jack (OMTP only?) models:

- HPM-60J has non-removable earbuds
- HPM-77/J same as HPM-77 but with 3.5 mm jack
- MH-500 has removable earbuds
- MH-700 has removable in-ear plugs
- MH-810 has non-removable earbuds with remote control (for Xperia X10 mini (pro) and Xperia X8 only)
- further headsets with non-removable headphones: VH50 (mono), MH410, MH610, MH650, MH710, MH750, MH1

=== Cables and charger ===
- ITC-60 TV-Out Cable (for C903, C905, Satio only)
- MMC-60 RCA stereo cable
- MMC-70 headphone jack stereo cable
- HCE-12 Antenna cable
- HCE-16 Mute cable for radio
- HCC-11/13/20/30 System cable for HCH-xx car holder
- CBC-100 Battery Charger (external battery charger)
- CPP-100 Power Pack (use your extra battery as 'powerbank')

==== USB ====
- DCU-10 / DCU-11 for phones with T28 (11pin)
- DCU-60 Standard fastport USB cable (ca. 140cm)
- DCU-65 Fastport USB cable with ferrite ring core (ca. 35cm/75cm)

==== wall charger ====
- CTR-10 Ericsson travel charger (old models)
- CST-13 450mA for old Ericsson phones only
- CST-15 350mA energy saving travel charger
- CST-18 350mA headset/handsfree travel charger
- CST-60 450mA
- CST-61 450mA headset/handsfree charger
- CST-70 700mA
- CST-75 750mA (has female fastport connector to attach e.g. headset while charging)
- CST-80 700mA USB-A charger
- CMT-60 Micro travel charger (charge phone with AC-plug or 2xAA batteries [powerbank-like] - does not charge AA-batteries)
- CMT-10 Micro travel charger (similar to CMT-60, but without batteries)

==== car charger ====
- CLA-11 Car charger (for old Ericsson phones)
- CLA-60 Car charger for cigar lighter
- AN402 / AN401 / AN402 car charger for cigar lighter (1200mA USB-A socket with cable)
- AN-300 (micro-USB only)

=== Docking stations ===
- CDW-10 Desktop charger with T28 connector (11pin)
- DSS-20 / DSS-25 SyncStation with T28 connector (11pin) (with serial interface, e.g. T610/T630/K300)
- CSS-25 Desk Speaker Stand (similar to DSS-20/25, but with integrated speaker and buttons) (11pin)
- CDS-60 / CDS-65 Docking station
- CDS-75 Desk Stand
- MPP-60 Docking station with RCA cable (Music Power Pack)
- MRC-60 Docking station with iR remote control (uses ATmega168V μC)
- EC-100 Docking station only for Aino
- DK300 Multimedia Dock only for Xperia Play

=== Other products ===
- MMR-70 FM transmitter (uses ATmega32L μC)
- MBR-100 Bluetooth music receiver
- CAR-100 R/C car (bluetooth - Android OSS project available)
- CCR-70 Memory Stick Micro (M2) USB cardreader
- IM-502 / IPK-100 Tripod for photo/video recording
- ISP-20/25/30/35/40/60/70/80/90 Stylus Pack
- MMV-200 Media Viewer Bluetooth (RCA + VGA out) (CF-Card, Memory Stick, SD Memory Card)
- MMV-100 Media Viewer Bluetooth (SCART)
- MXE-60 Add-on Xenon flash with red‑eye reduction for various older Sony Ericsson mobile phones (e.g. W810i)
- MPF-10 Add-on LED flash for phones with the T28 (11pin) connector (e.g. T610/T630/K300/etc.)
- MCA-10 / MCA-20 / MCA-25 / MCA-30 Cell Phone Digital Camera for T28 connector phones (also known as the CommuniCam). (11pin)
- EGB-10 Gameboard is supposed to show the advantages in the preinstalled game "V-Rally 2" (e.g. for Z600 and T630) (11pin)

== See also ==
- List of Ericsson products
- List of Sony products
- Mylo (Sony)
