= K600 =

K600 may stand for:

- Kaman HH-43 Huskie or K-600, a helicopter
- Sony Ericsson K600 mobile phone
- HMS St Brides Bay (K600), an anti-aircraft frigate
