= Sony Ericsson T707 =

Mobile phone from Sony Ericsson

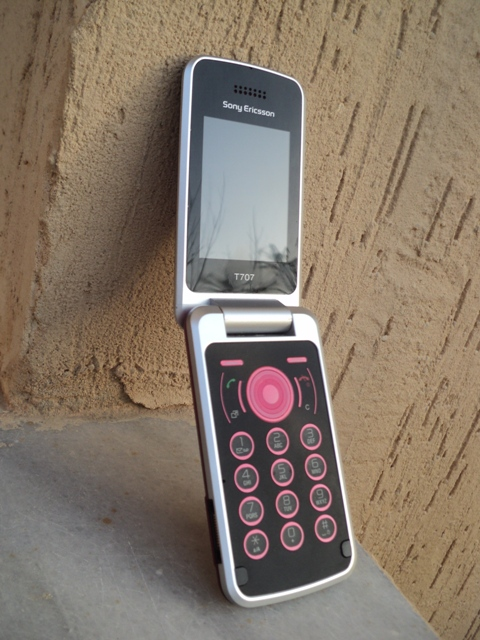
- Manufacturer: Sony Ericsson
- Availability by region: Q2 2009
- Compatible networks: GSM 850/900/1800/1900, GPRS, EDGE, UMTS, HSDPA
- Form factor: Clamshell
- Dimensions: 93×50×14.1 mm (3.66×1.97×0.56 in)
- Weight: 95 g (3 oz)
- Memory: 100 MB
- Removable storage: Memory Stick Micro M2
- Rear camera: 3.2-megapixel
- Display: 2.2" main, 1.1" secondary
- Connectivity: Bluetooth, USB
- Data inputs: Keypad

The Sony Ericsson T707 (also known as Sony Ericsson Equinox in the US) is a fashion-oriented mobile phone from Sony Ericsson. It was announced on 26 March 2009, in conjunction with tennis star Maria Sharapova. The product was discontinued in January 2012.

It has a clamshell design, featuring a small 1.1” scratch-resistant, monochromatic OLED external screen (128 × 36 pixel) that’s built into the phone’s casing. The main screen is a 2.2” 240 × 320 pixel, 262k colour TFT. It comes in three colours; Mysterious Black, Spring Rose and Lucid Blue.

One of its lifestyle features is it enables users to personalise pulsating light settings depending on who is calling. It also features gesture control as you can wave your hand over the screen to trigger actions such as muting calls.

The T707 features a 3.2 MP rear-facing camera, which has an up to 3.2x digital zoom and can be used for video calls. It has an FM radio and supports Sony Ericsson standards such as motion gaming and the PlayNow download service for content such as music, games and ringtones.

In terms of software, it uses the Access NetFront web browser and enables photo, video and text blogging. There is direct access to YouTube and the ability to geo-tag photos to Google Maps as well.

GSM/GPRS standby time is up to 400 hours. Talk time is up to 10 hours. This is reduced to 4 hours for UMTS.

== Features ==
- Quad-band GSM and 3G with HSDPA support
- 3.15-megapixel camera with Cell-ID geotagging (digital zoom up to 3.2x)
- Video light
- 2.2-inch 256K-color TFT display with 240 × 320 pixels resolution
- Secondary monochrome external display (36 × 128 pixels)
- Scratch-resistant surface for both displays
- Bluetooth stereo with A2DP
- Hot-swappable M2 card slot (up to 16 GB)
- FM radio with RDS
- Basic multi-tasking support
- Gesture control
- Light effects with 5 colors, assignable to contacts
- Smart dialing
- Threaded messaging
- Access NetFront
- Google Maps
