= Sony Ericsson S312 =

Mobile phone model

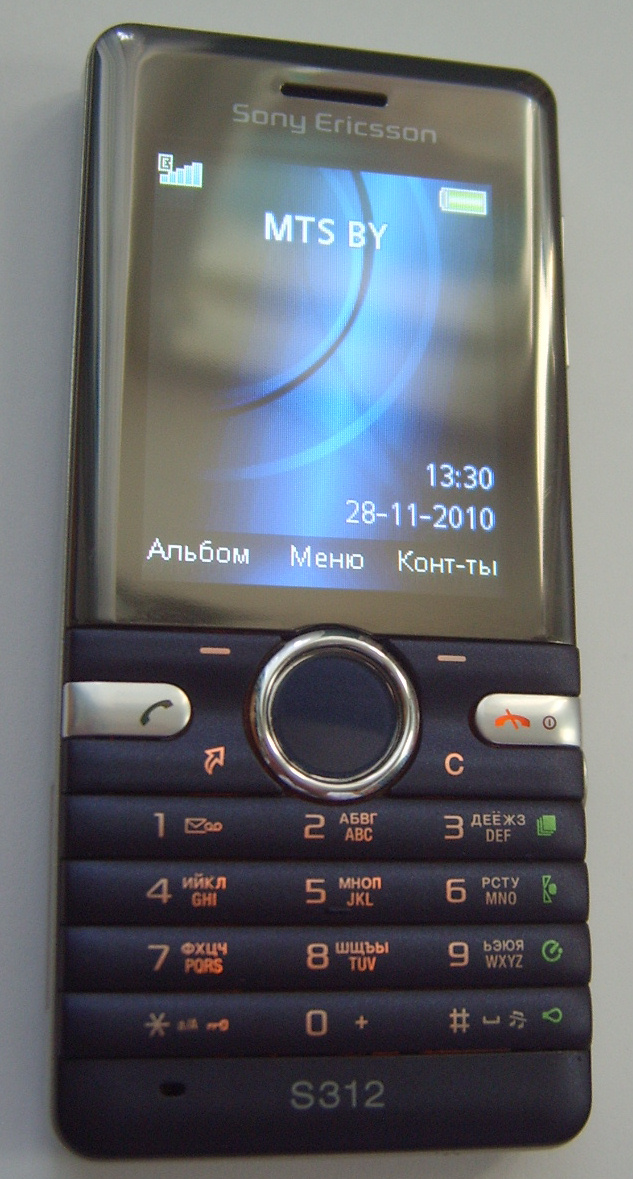
- Sony Ericsson S312
- Manufacturer: Sony Ericsson
- Availability by region: Q2 2009
- Compatible networks: GSM 900, 1800, GPRS, EDGE
- Form factor: Candybar
- Dimensions: 100×46×12.5 mm (3.94×1.81×0.49 in)
- Weight: 80 g (3 oz)
- Memory: up to 15 MB
- Removable storage: Memory Stick Micro
- Rear camera: 2 Megapixel
- Display: 2", 176 x 220 pixel
- Connectivity: Bluetooth, USB
- Data inputs: Keypad

The Sony Ericsson S312 is a budget, lifestyle dual-band GSM mobile phone, with a focus on photography features, manufactured by Sony Ericsson. It was announced on 7 April 2009, and was available from Q2 2009.

It adopts a candybar design, featuring a 2-inch, 262k color, 176 x 220 pixel, scratch-resistance screen, and a 2-megapixel camera with an up to 2.5x digital zoom and a coupled light. It comes in two colours; Dawn Blue and Honey Silver.

With respect to its photography features, as well as the standard vertical orientation, it is designed to be used in the horizontal position.

Other options include illuminated keypad shortcuts, which enable users to quickly change camera settings, while there is an integrated Photo fix function. This is designed to process and correction images easily and quickly. Finally, as well as the usual camera shutter button, there is a dedicated key to trigger the use of camera to record video footage.

As well as camera features, the S312 contains integrated photo blogging software, and Sony Ericsson's PlayNow media download service for content such as music, games and ringtones. It uses the Openwave web browser. Messaging software include email, MMS, SMS, FM radio with RDS, and Java gaming.

Standby time is up to 400 hours. Talk time is up to 8 hours.
