= Sony Ericsson C510 =

Mobile phone model

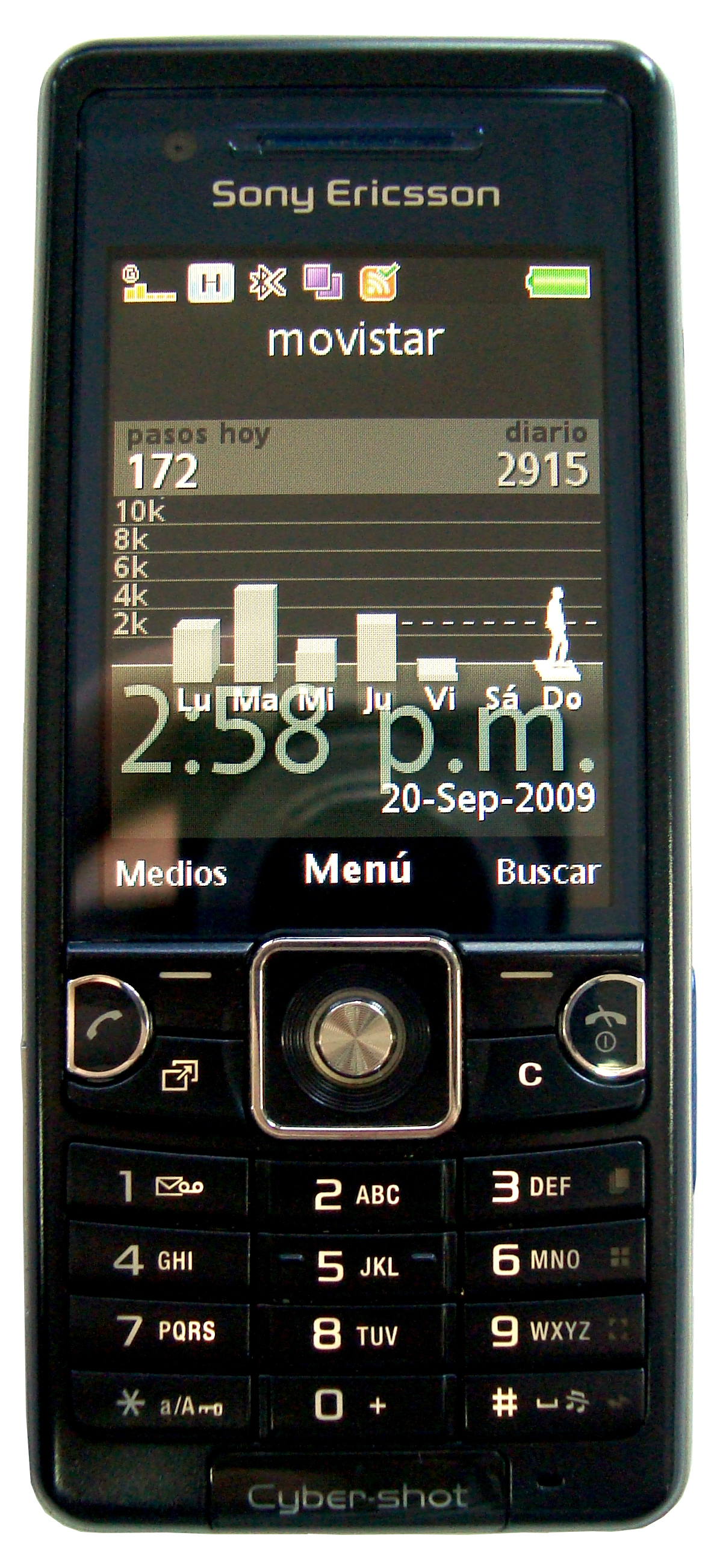
- Manufacturer: Sony Ericsson
- Series: Cyber-shot
- Availability by region: 2009
- Predecessor: Sony Ericsson K510i
- Related: Sony Ericsson C902; Sony Ericsson C905
- Form factor: Candybar
- Dimensions: 107×47×12.5 mm (4.21×1.85×0.49 in)
- Weight: 92 g
- Operating system: Sony Ericsson’s proprietary OS
- CPU: 220 MHz
- Memory: 100 MB (internal)
- Removable storage: Memory Stick Micro (M2), expandable up to 8 GB
- Battery: Li-Polymer (930 mAh)
- Rear camera: 3.2 MP, 2048x1536 pixels
- Front camera: (VGA) Videocall camera
- Display: 2.2 inches, TFT, 256K colors
- Connectivity: Bluetooth v2.0 with A2DP, GPRS, 3G, UMTS, HSPA
- Data inputs: Keypad

The C510 is one of the mobile phones in Sony Ericsson's Cyber-shot series. Released on 7 January 2009, it was a successor to the K510i model. It is widely characterised as one of Sony Ericsson best non-smartphone devices released to the market.

== Features ==
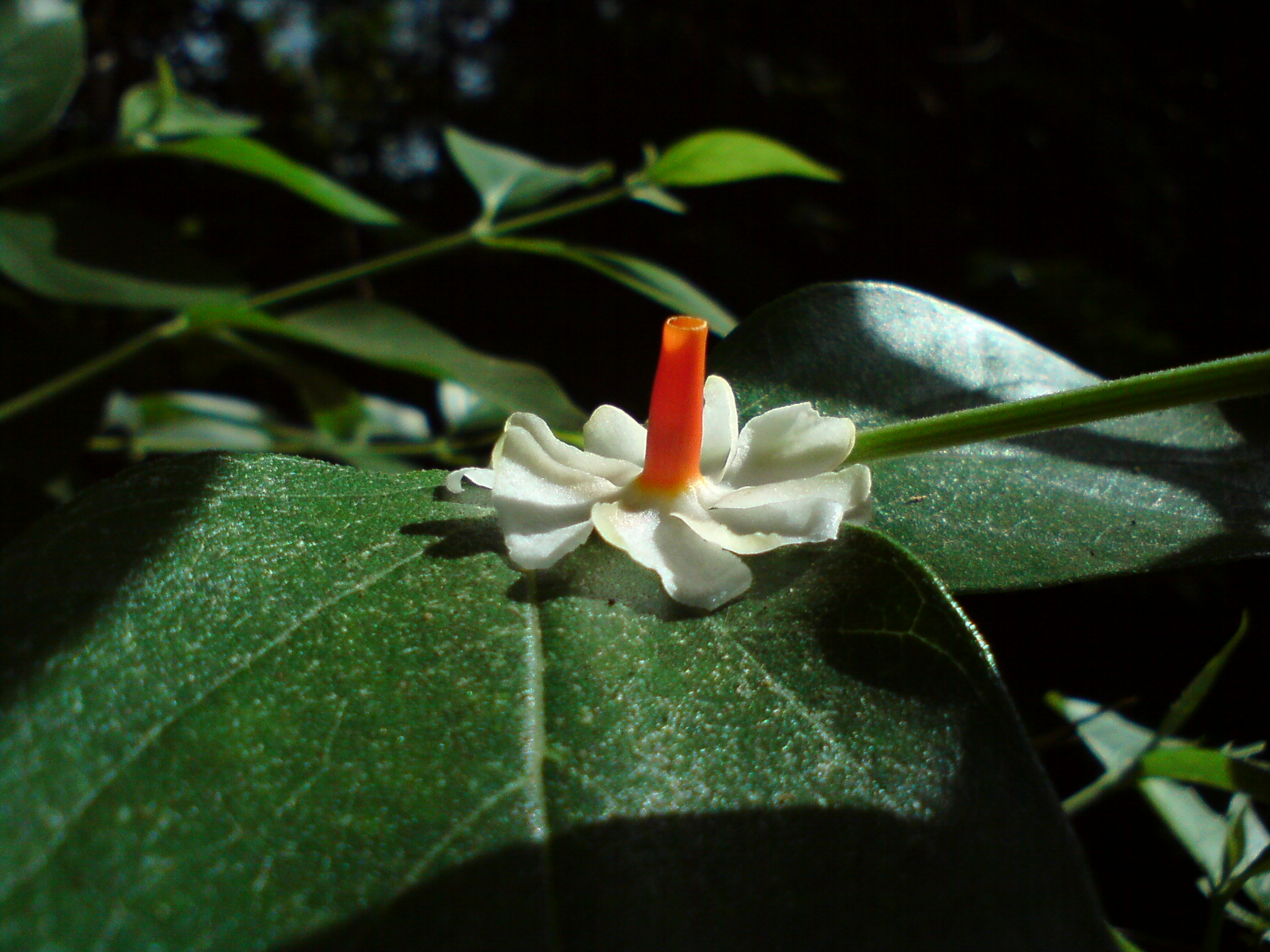
Photo taken with C510

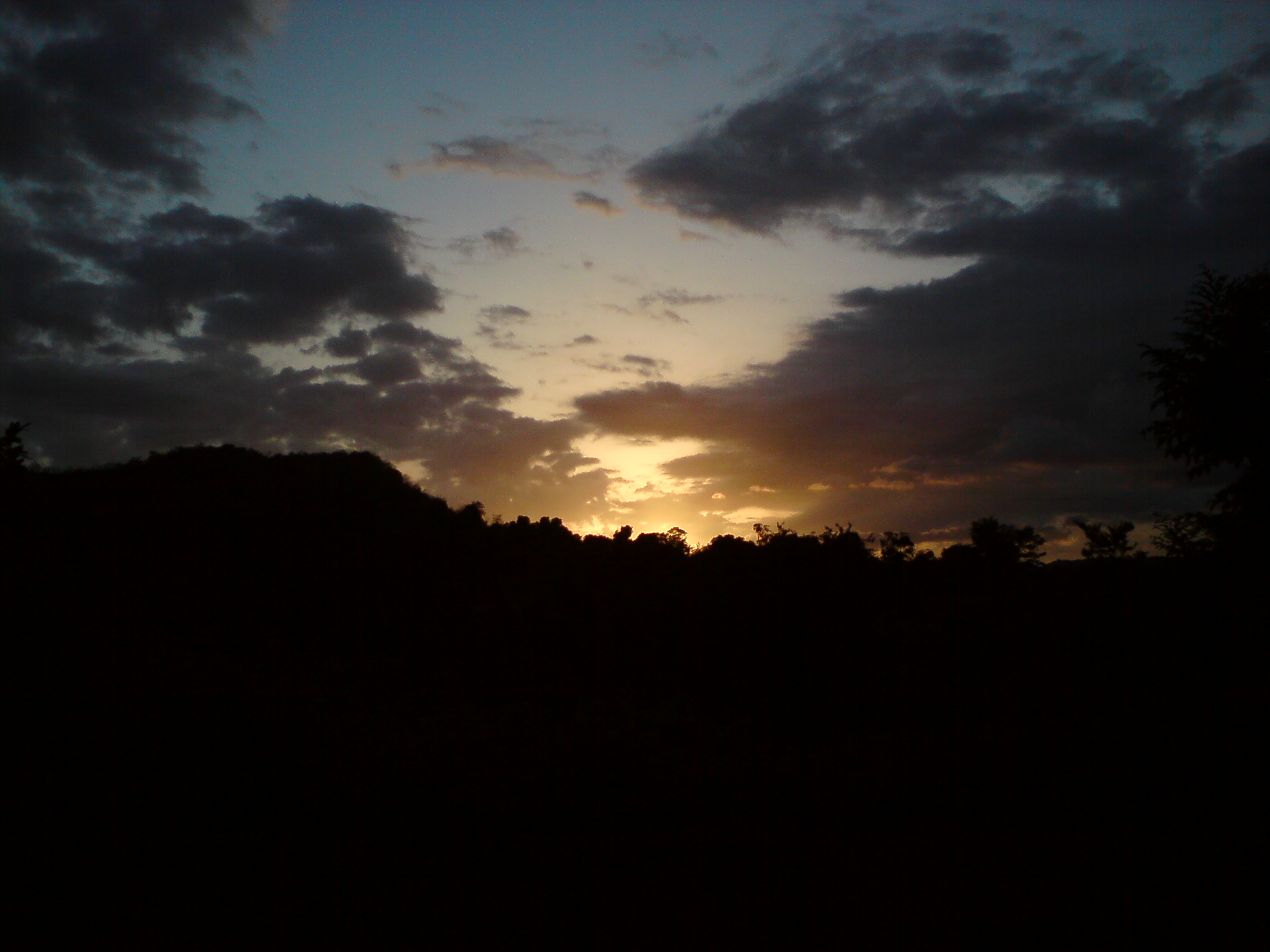
Photo taken with C510

The C510 is one of the first mobile phones to come integrated with Smile Shutter technology. Along with face detection, this feature automatically takes a photo when a person smiles. This feature was later added to the C905 model. The phone can also play YouTube videos, upload pictures to the blogging site Blogger and comes with Facebook integrated.

The phone also has a protector for the camera, scratch-resistant display and buttons with blue illumination while in shooting mode for features such as flash. The phone also offers a large selection of settings for exposure and a built-in photo editor.

My Carrier: Movistar ES

Movistar Startup

== Performance ==
The camera can shoot at up to 3.2 MP and can record video at 30 frame/s in QVGA format. A firmware upgrade allows the phone to run processes such as Windows Live Messenger. The phone supports autorotation for portrait to landscape via the built-in accelerometer, which is also used for various other applications such as a step counter (Walk Mate) and some games. The phone has the ability to work as a modem, and in a good 3G signal area up to reasonable broadband speeds can be achieved. It supports memory cards up to 8 GB in capacity via the Memory Stick Micro port.

== Virtues and issues ==
This phone is very stable and reliable, the quality of the batteries is excellent. Dust collects between the camera lens and the housing (lens protector), which is very difficult to remove. In the long run, these phones break down because of buttons that stop working, no repair possible.

== Java Platform 8 ==
The C510 has Sony Ericsson Java Platform 8 profile, and so allows Flash Lite to run as a front-end to Java ME.
