= Sony Ericsson K600 =

Mobile Phone

Sony Ericsson K600i
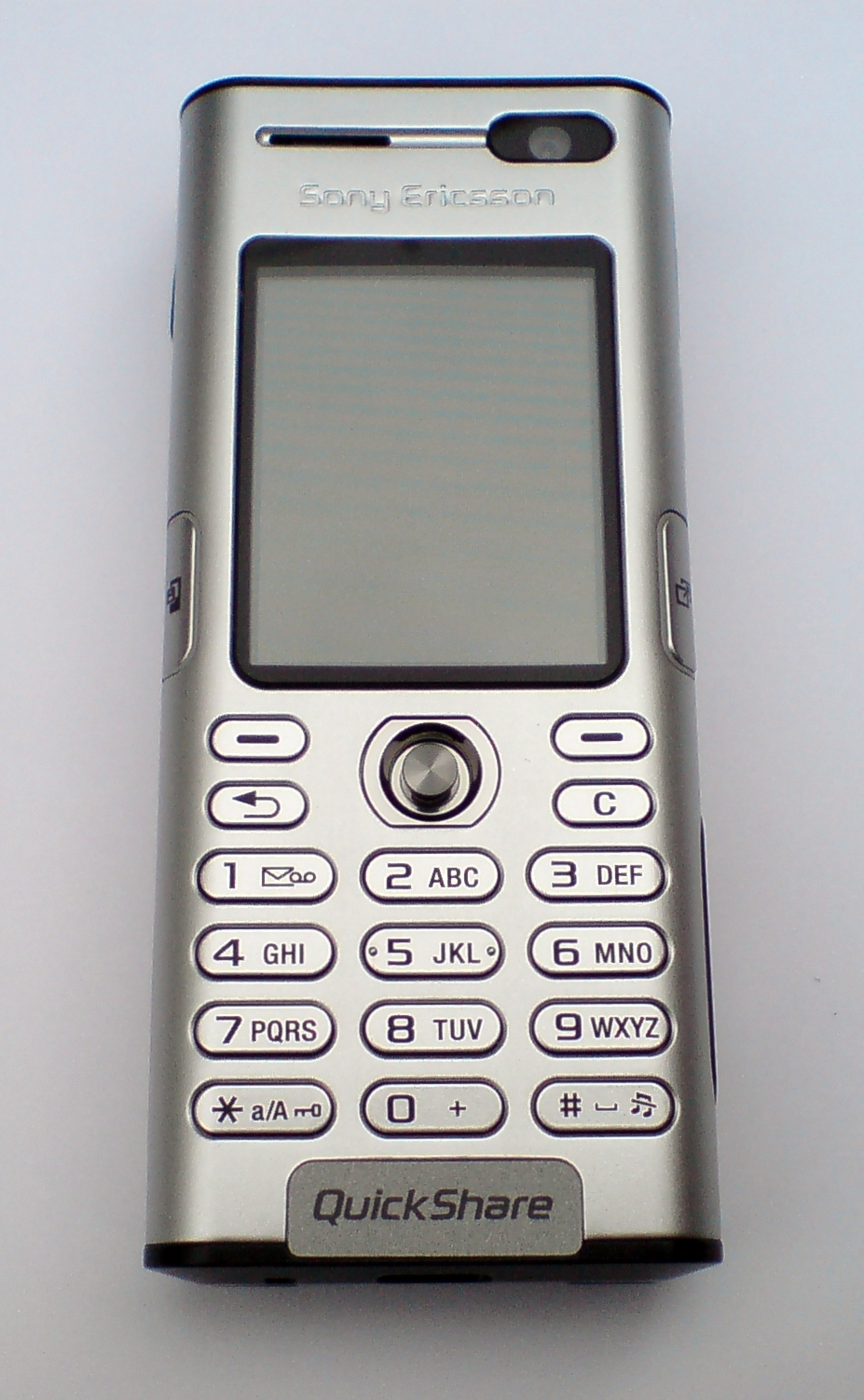
- Series: K
- First released: 2005 Q1
- Compatible networks: UMTS 2100, GSM 900 / 1800 / 1900
- Dimensions: 104.3×45×18.9 mm (4.11×1.77×0.74 in)
- Weight: 105 g (4 oz)
- Memory: 33MB
- Battery: 900 mAh Li-ion bst-37
- Rear camera: 1.3 megapixels
- Front camera: Videocall camera
- Display: 1.8 inch, 176x220 pixels, 256,000 color TFT
- Connectivity: Bluetooth, infrared port, USB
- Model: K600

The Sony Ericsson K600 is a 3G mobile phone handset manufactured by Sony Ericsson. It was announced in the first quarter of 2005.

The K600i is its international variant. Generally available on the Orange network in the UK, the K600i is closely related to the K608i and V600i models, and was produced at the same time. The K608i was available on the 3 network, and the V600i was available on the Vodafone network. The K608i and V600i are both practically the same phone internally as the K600i, but look different externally.

== Main features ==
K600i Specifications:

- Measurement: 104.3mm x 45mm x 18.9mm (4.13" x 1.77" x .79")
- Weight: 105g, 3.7 oz
- 1.3 MegaPixel, 1280x1024 pixels (main camera) and front-mounted QCIF (176x144 pixels) camera for video calls
- digital zoom up to 4x and photo light
- triband with GPRS and 3G support
- MP3, MPEG4 playback
- 33MB internal memory
- FM Radio with RDS
- Bluetooth and Infrared support
- Java MIDP 2.0

== Reviews ==
The K600 was relatively small for a 3G phone at the time of its manufacture. As the phone doesn't feature a memory card slot, it is mainly criticised for its inability to expand memory. It is usually praised for its camera and its connectivity options, it can serve as a modem for a computer either via USB data cable or Bluetooth.

== See also ==
- List of Sony Ericsson products
