= Sony Ericsson W380 =

Mobile phone model

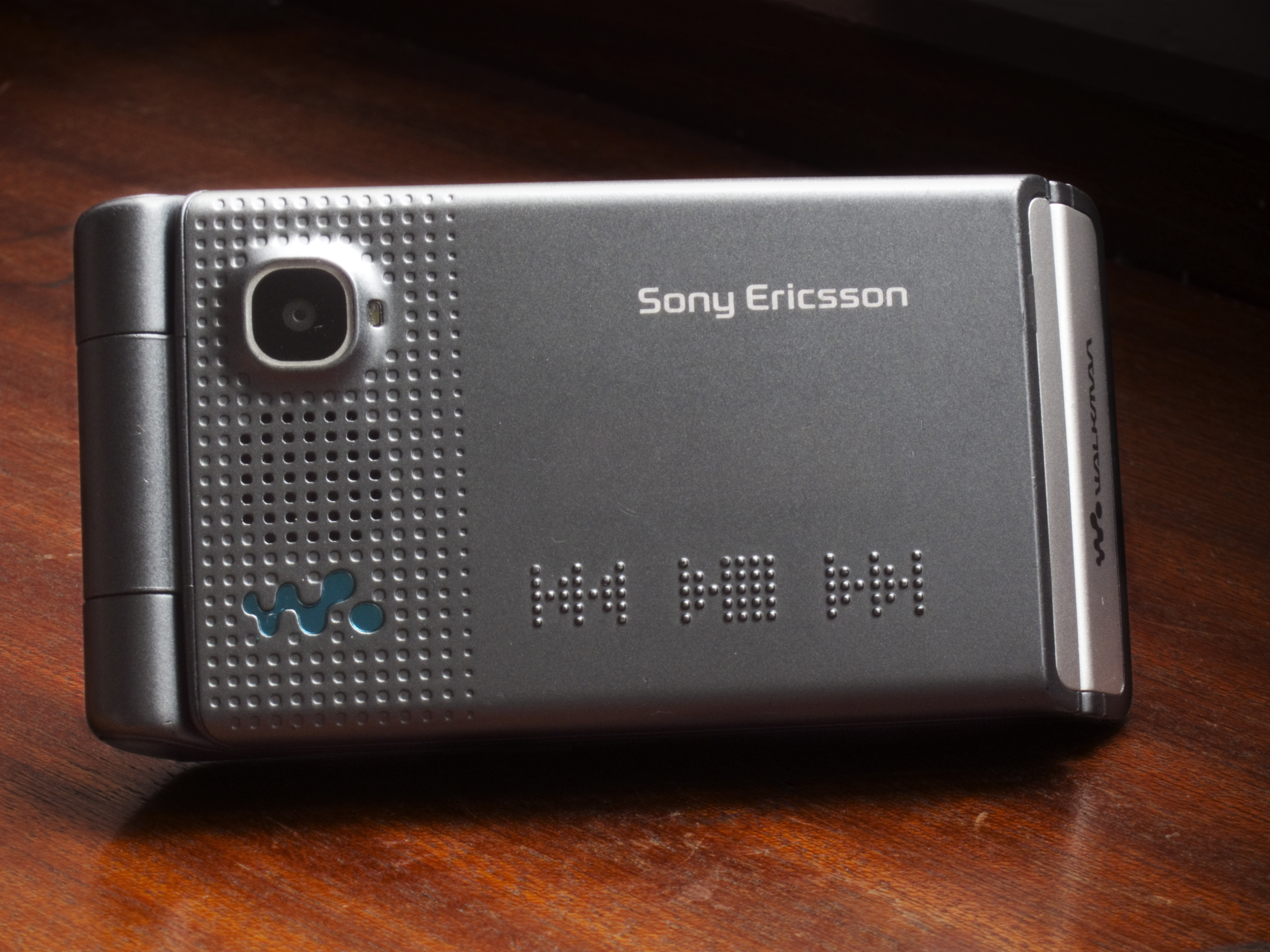
- Manufacturer: Sony Ericsson
- Series: Walkman
- Predecessor: W350
- Successor: W550
- Compatible networks: GSM, EDGE
- Dimensions: 92×49×16 mm (3.62×1.93×0.63 in)
- Weight: 100 g (3.5 oz)
- Operating system: Sony Ericsson proprietary OS
- Memory: 14 MiB internal
- Removable storage: Up to 4GB Memory Stick Micro M2
- Rear camera: 1.3 megapixel
- Display: 1,9" 262,144 colors (176x220 pixels) TFT, 28x36 pixels OLED monochrome external
- Connectivity: Bluetooth, USB
- Data inputs: Keypad

Sony Ericsson W380 is a mobile phone that belongs to the Walkman series. This phone has multiple function for camera, such as negative, black and white or sepia.
