= PlayNow Arena =

Defunct download service by Sony Ericsson

PlayNow
- Developer: Sony Ericsson
- Initial release: February 2004; 22 years ago
- Platform: Sony Ericsson mobile phones, PC
- Type: Mobile content portal
- Website: http://www.playnowarena.com

PlayNow was Sony Ericsson's download service for media that included music, games, ringtones, wallpapers and themes. It was introduced in February 2004 as a way for owners of SE phones to listen to and directly purchase ringtones. It was rolled out into 32 countries. The Sony Ericsson S700 was the first Sony Ericsson phone to come pre-loaded with PlayNow.

PlayNow was expanded in mid-2008 into the browser-based portal, PlayNow arena. This first went live in the Nordic countries in August 2008 and offered additional types of free and premium content, including 1 million DRM-free tracks from record companies such as Sony Music, Warner Music, and EMI. It also enabled the dual download of MP3 music tracks, with one higher quality MP3 track downloaded direct to PC, and one lower quality track to the phone.

PlayNow arena is organised on a per country basis, and is compatible with a wide range of Sony Ericsson phones. It also supports various thirdparty Windows Media DRM-enabled devices.

Part of the PlayNow service was the TrackID mobile music recognition service. Using this system, you could have recorded several seconds of music on your phone to find out the artist and track. Where available, you could have also purchased the identified track direct from PlayNow. TrackID worked via the Sony-owned Gracenote identification system.

In September 2008, Sony Ericsson announced PlayNow plus; a paid for subscription service. It was launched in Sweden at the cost of 99 Swedish crowns (around $15) per month on the W902 Walkman phone through operator Telenor.

PlayNow plus was bundled and billed via a mobile operator and enabled unlimited downloads of DRM-controlled music, as well as PC playback via Omnifone's music player. Pre-loaded music offers were also planned for subsequent PlayNow plus-enabled phones.

In May 2009, Sony Ericsson announced PlayNow arena with movies. This was a bundled out-of-the-box services that enabled users to download up to 60 specially formatted movies per year. Organised on a per country basis, a total of 15 movies (new and classics) were to be available at any one time with four replacement titles added every month. The movies were accessed via a PC and side loaded on the phone via USB. They could have been watched as many times as possible for up to 90 days. They couldn't be played on any other device. PlayNow arena with movies were to launch in June 2009 with the W995 Walkman phone in Sweden, Norway, the Netherlands, Germany and the UK.

As of Sony's complete acquisition in 2011, this service is no longer available, and has been replaced with Sony Entertainment Network.
