= Sony Ericsson T290 =

Cellphone model

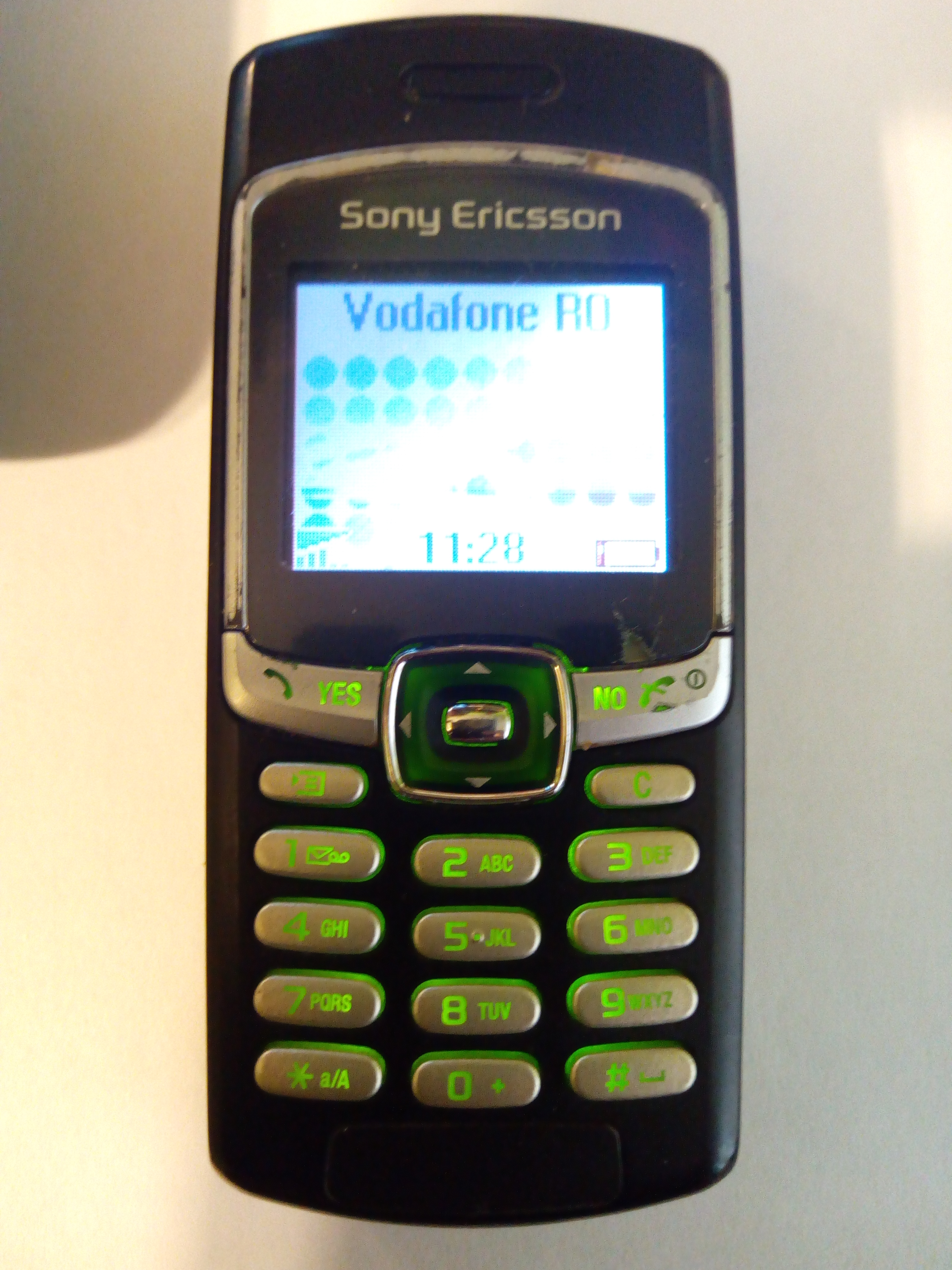
Sony Ericsson T290

Sony Ericsson T290 is a cellphone released by Sony Ericsson in 2004. It has a 700 mAh Li-ion battery, a 101x80 pixels screen. It weighs 78 grams and has no Bluetooth or infrared. The T290 is very similar to Sony Ericsson T230, apart from speakerphone mode.

== Variants ==
Name	For these zones	GSM Bands
T290c	China	900/1800 MHz
T290i	International	900/1800 MHz
T290a	America	850/1900 MHz

Name	For these zones	GSM Bands
T238	China	900/1800 MHz
T230	International	900/1800 MHz
T226	America	850/1900 MHz
