= Sony Ericsson K660i =

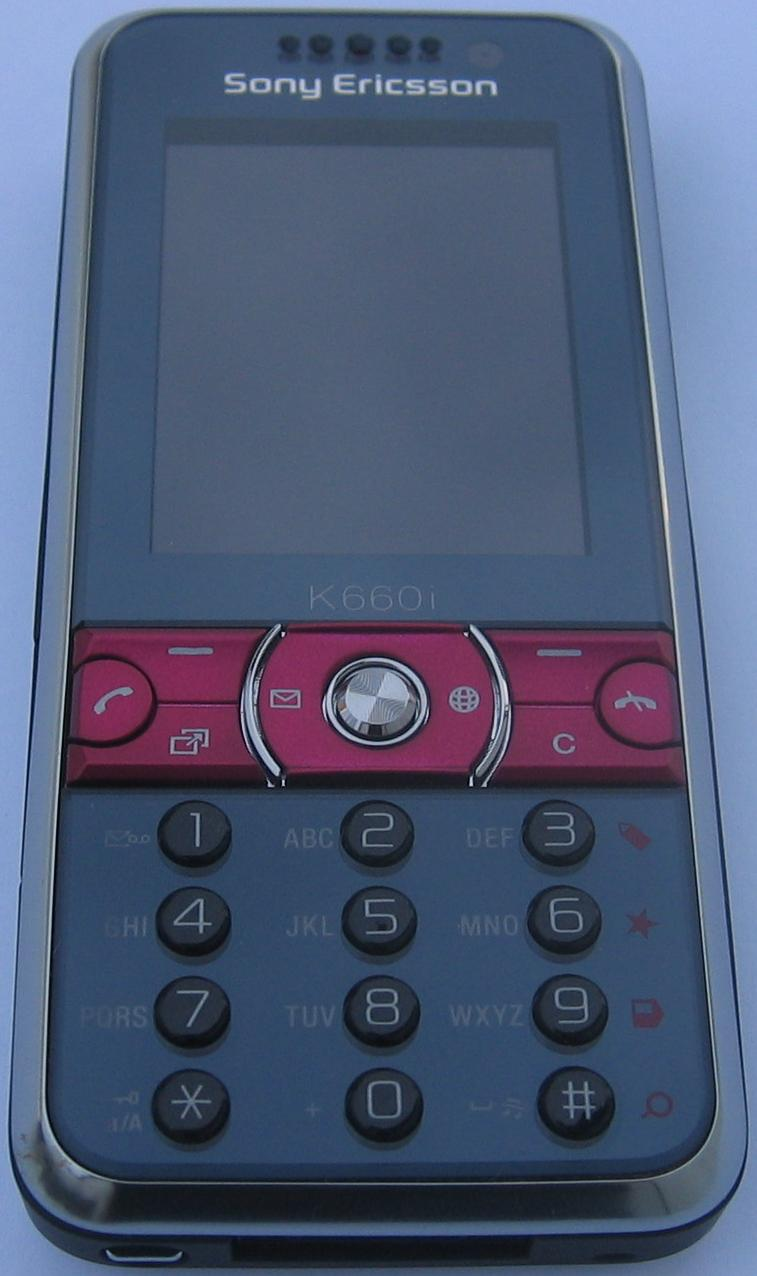
- Compatible networks: GSM 850, GSM 900, GSM 1800, GSM 1900
- Dimensions: 104×47×15 mm (4.09×1.85×0.59 in)
- Weight: 95 g (3 oz)
- Memory: 32 MB internal, Memory Stick Micro support (up to 4 GB)
- Rear camera: 2.0 megapixel and front VGA camera for videocalls
- Display: 240×320 pixels, 262,144-colour TFT-LCD
- Connectivity: EDGE, GPRS, UMTS, HSDPA 2100, Bluetooth v2.0, USB 2

The K660i is a camera phone produced by Sony Ericsson released in 2008 (14 March 2008 in Norway).
