= Sony Ericsson T300 =

Entry-level GSM mobile phone released in December 2002

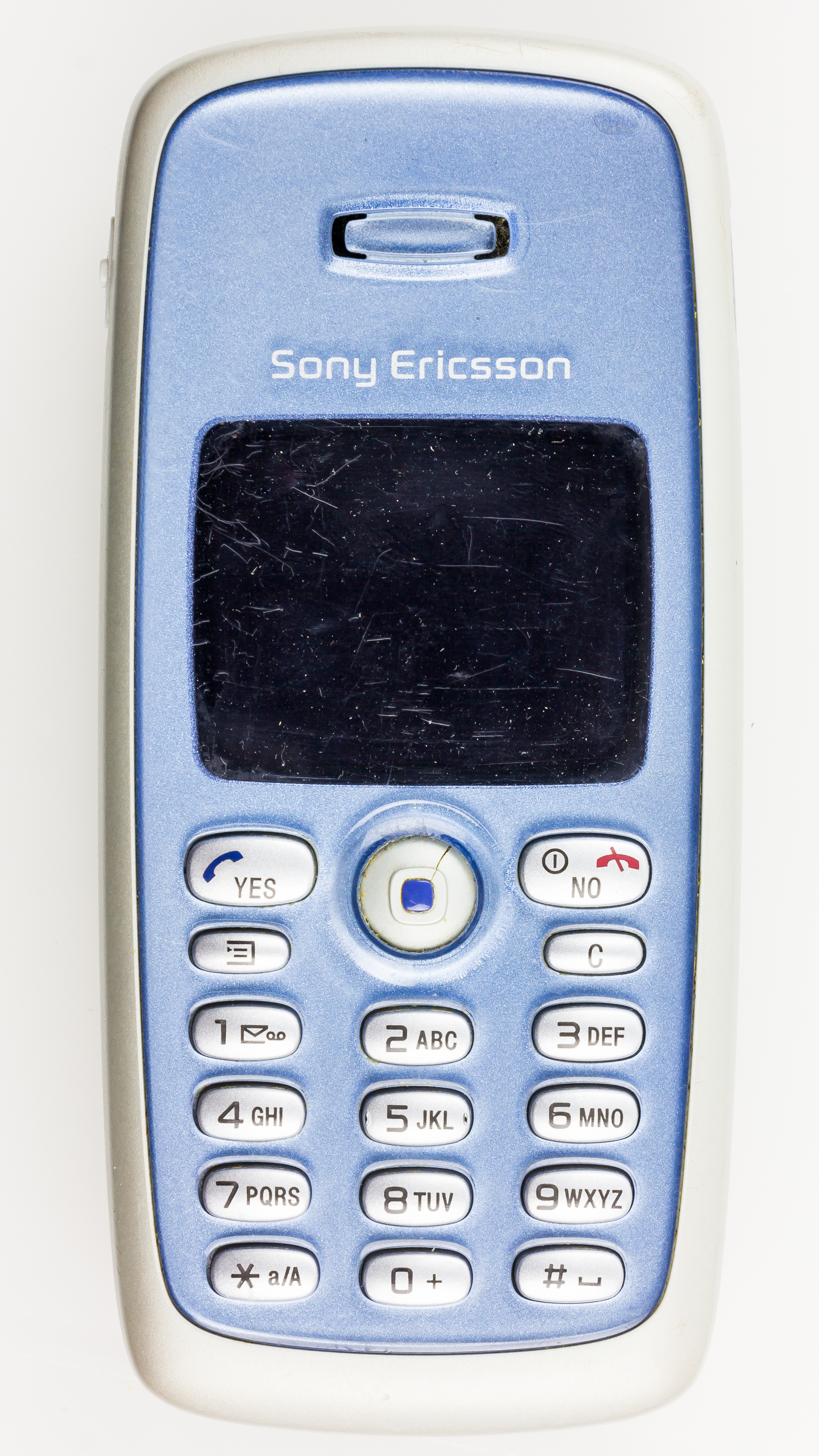
T300

The Sony Ericsson T300 is an entry-level GSM mobile phone, and one of the first with a colour screen. It was released in October 2002. The Cingular variant, the T306, was released in December 2002.

It operated on the 2G network and triple band GSM (900/1800/1900, or 850/1800/1900 for the T306).

== Features ==
The T300 is a slightly cut-down version of its predecessor, the T68, lacking Bluetooth and some software functions. It features GPRS connectivity and has an IrDA port. The optional CommuniCam accessory is coupled to the phone's accessory port, and can be used to take still photographs at up to VGA (640x480) resolution. Captured photos could be sent via MMS, which was one of the phone's key selling points. It also has an optional FM receiver, model HPR-20, coupled like the CommuniCam. This has stereo earphones and a microphone, making it one of the first handsfree capable cellular phones.

It can also operate as a modem, using its IR port to create a data link to a PC or Laptop using a serial (COM) port configuration with NMEA 0183 version 2.0 data.

The T300 is capable of sending and receiving Email, and has a WAP/HTML Web browser. Unlike its predecessor, the T300 has a dedicated PCM sound generator, manufactured by OKI, the same company that provided the sound hardware for entry-level Casio keyboards. It was used to play polyphonic ringtones and MMS content. Additional upgrades to the software included support for downloadable Mophun games and digital zoom on its then-new MCA-25 CommuniCam.

== Display ==
Display		
Type	Size	
STN, 256 colors	101 x 80 pixels, 6 lines	– Wallpapers
