= Sony Ericsson Elm =

Cell phone

The Sony Ericsson Elm (J10 and J10i2) is a cell phone released in 2010. It is a compact handset noted for its environmentally friendly features.

== Features ==
Elm has a 5 megapixel camera, microSD memory card slot, and FM radio. The phone also came with social media widgets built in, such as Facebook, Twitter and MySpace.

Upon release, the phone was available in two color schemes: black/silver (matte-black frame with silver-coloured battery lid), and pink.

Apart from the form factor and the very minor software changes required by the difference in form, the Elm is feature-wise identical to the Sony Ericsson Hazel (J20i). The J10 variant has a second video call camera on display side, whereas the J10i2 features A-GPS and Wi-Fi. However, the J10i2 was more widely available on the market, making the J10 variant extremely rare to find.

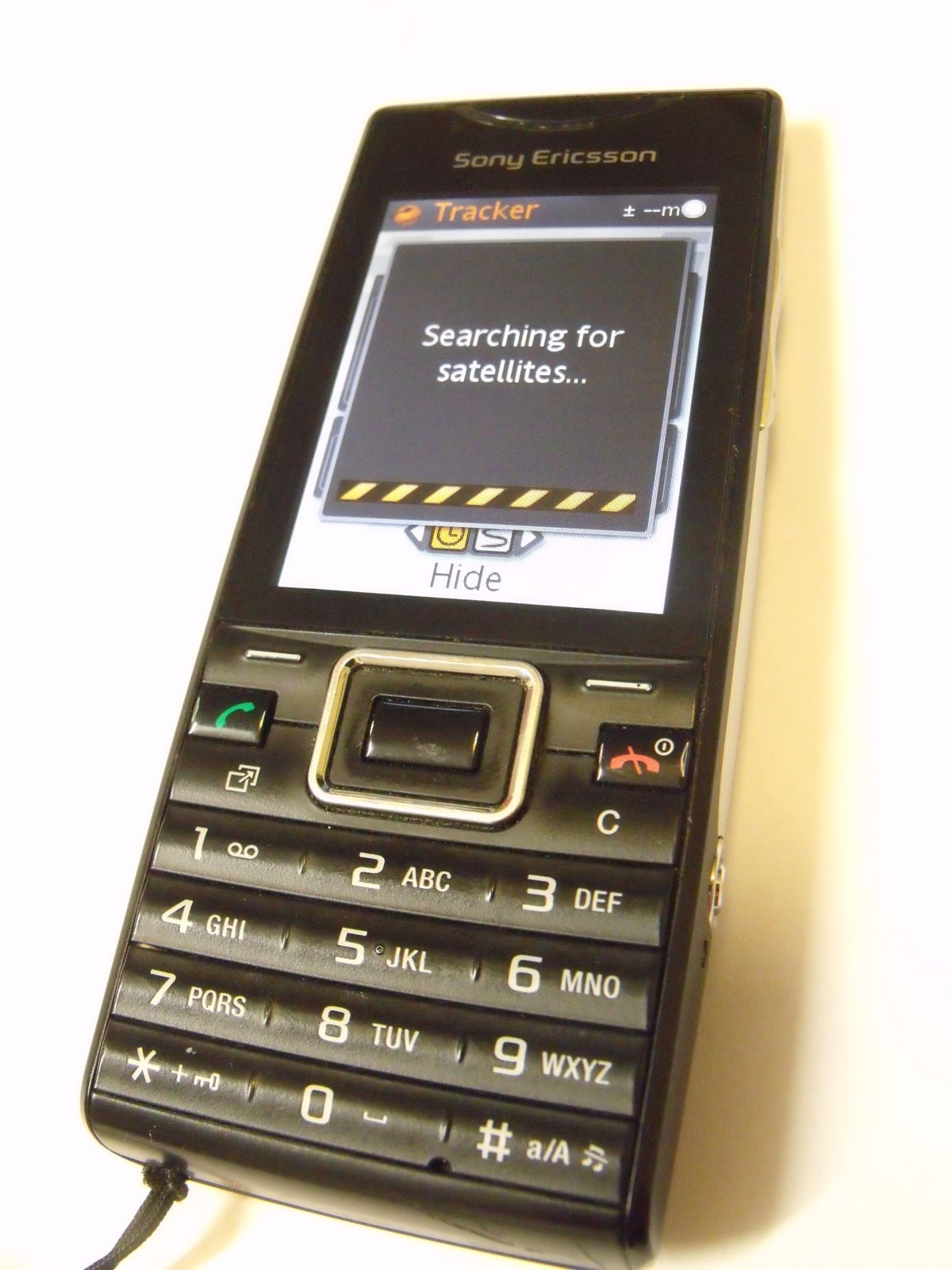
Sony Ericsson Elm J10i2 running A-GPS scanner.

== Greenheart ==
The phone is one of Sony Ericsson's earliest environmentally friendly "Greenheart" range, featuring devices made of recycled materials, longer battery life and low-energy chargers, as well as minimal use of paper through reduced packaging and the replacement of the traditional printed user manual with one stored on the phone. The Elm was made from recycled plastic and free of toxic chemicals. The device also shipped with "eco-aware" applications such as the "green calculator", which showed saved CO_{2} by walking, minimized packaging and the use of waterborne paint, as well as "Walk Mate", a walking navigation app.

Eco-rating, an organization providing sustainability scores to mobile devices, gave Elm 4.3 out of 5 rating, which is the highest among the handsets it evaluated in 2010.
