= Sony Ericsson Z610 =

Cellphone model

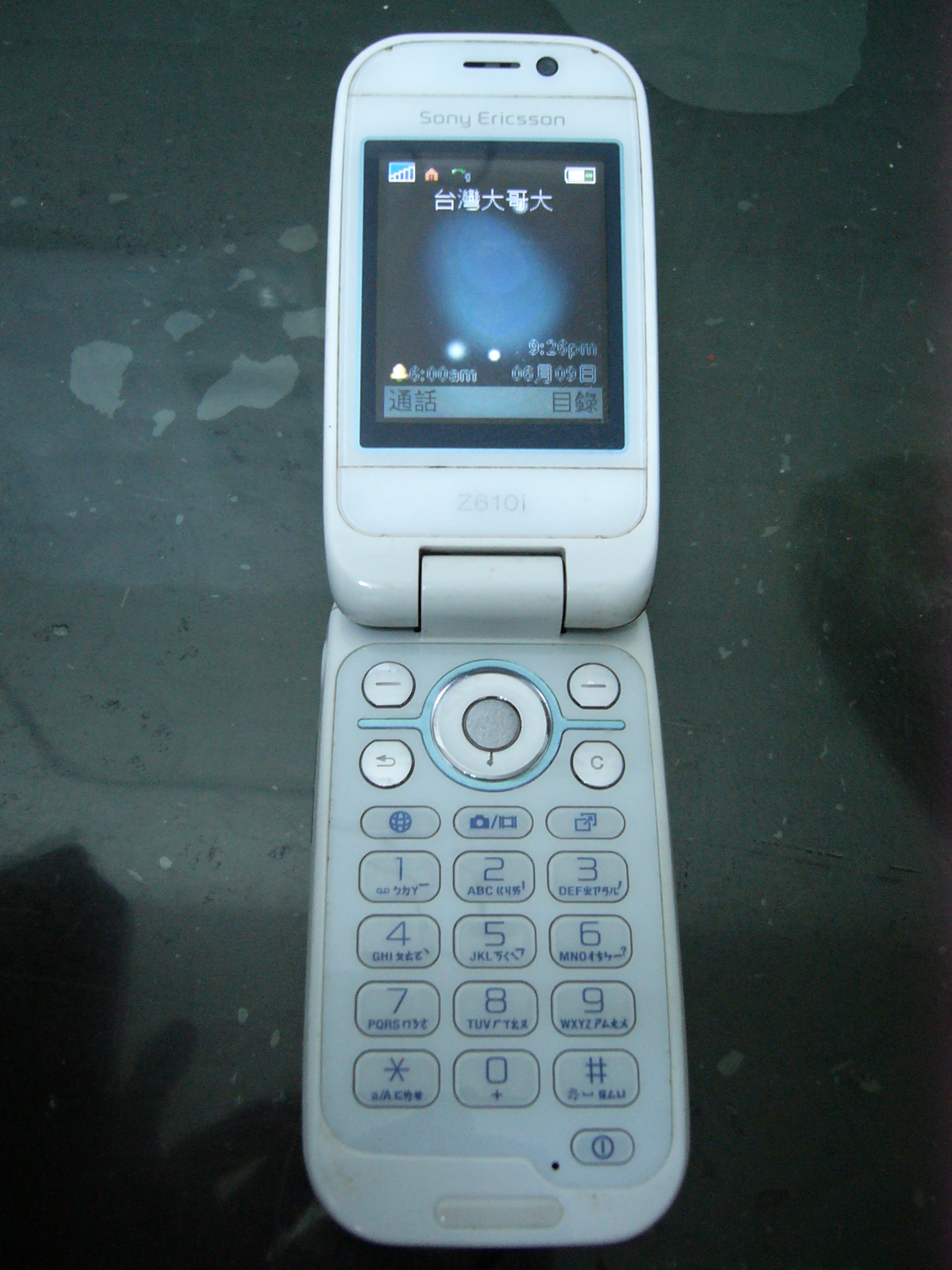
Open Sony Ericsson Z610

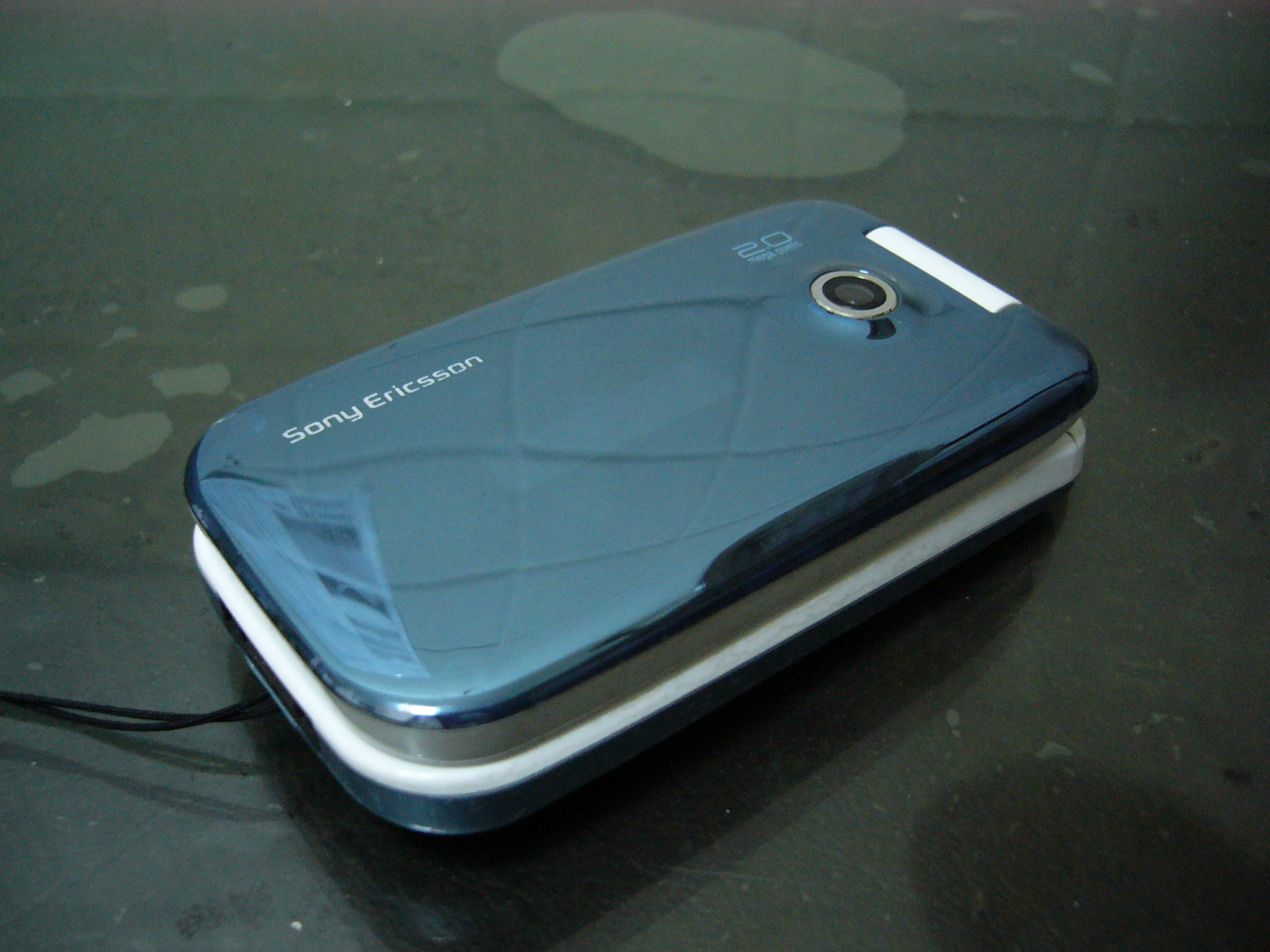
Closed Sony Ericsson Z610

Sony Ericsson Z610 was a cellphone made by Sony Ericsson. It was announced in August 2006. It had a 176x220 pixels main screen, a secondary screen on the back, a 950 mAh Li-ion battery, a 2 MP camera on the back and another one on the front. It had Bluetooth 2.0, 900/1800/1900 GSM and 2100 UMTS bands. The phone had a dual camera for 3G video calling.

The phone's design was "inspired by nature" and was originally available in three colors: Luster Black, Rose Pink and Airy Blue.
