= Sony Ericsson W810 =

Cell phone model

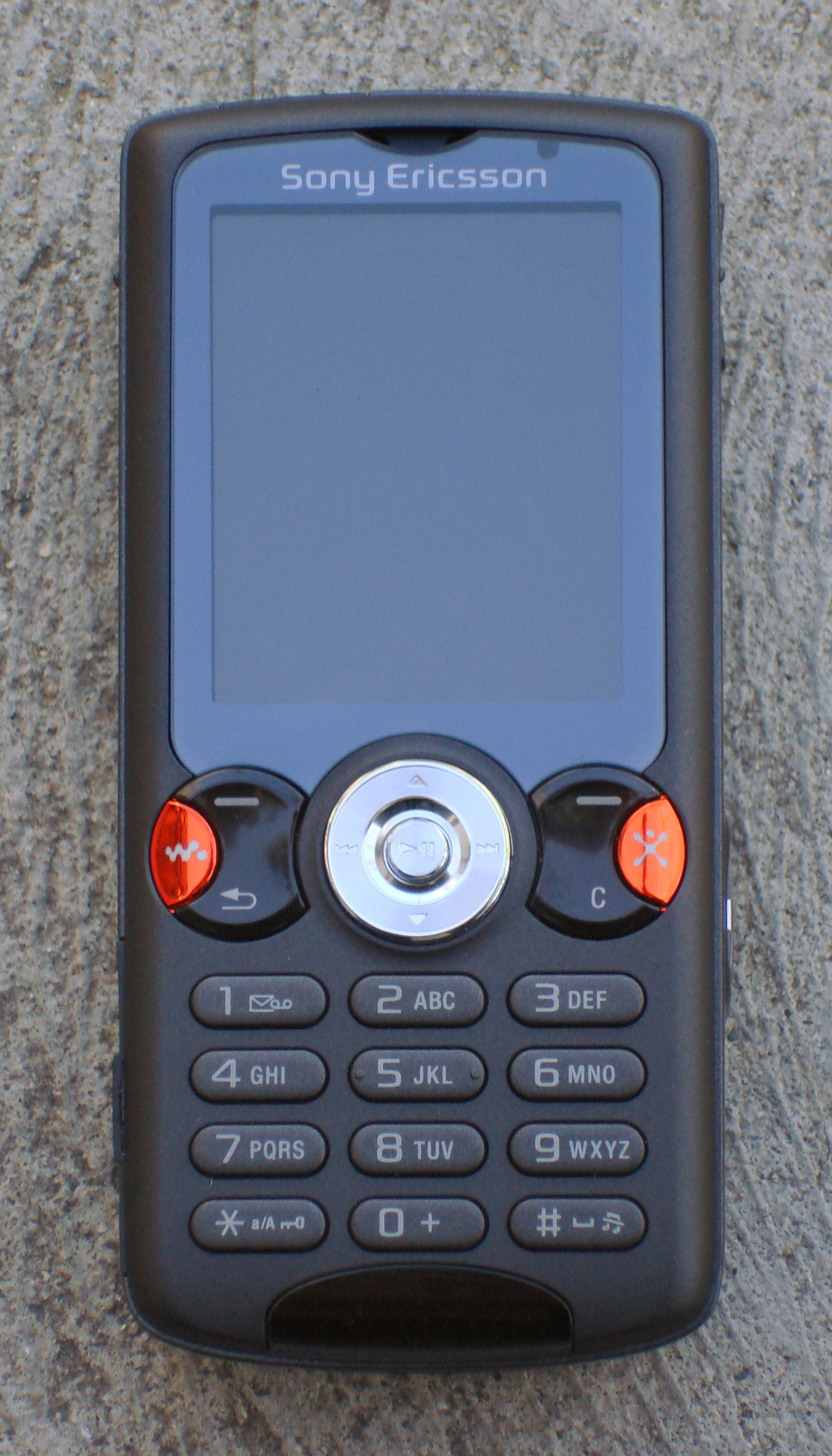
- First released: 2006; 20 years ago
- Availability by region: January 2006
- Predecessor: Sony Ericsson W800
- Successor: Sony Ericsson W880i
- Compatible networks: GSM 850, GSM 900, GSM 1800, GSM 1900
- Form factor: Candybar
- Dimensions: 100×46×19.5 mm (3.94×1.81×0.77 in)
- Weight: 99 g
- Operating system: Java, Sony Ericsson A100 Platform
- System-on-chip: DB2010
- Memory: 20 MB internal, Memory Stick PRO Duo support (up to 4 GB)
- Rear camera: 2.0 megapixel with autofocus 4.8 mm 1:2.8
- Display: 176×220 pixels, 262,144 colour TFT-LCD
- Connectivity: EDGE, GPRS, HSCSD, Bluetooth v2.0, IrDA, USB 2

The W810 (also available as the W810i and W810c) is a camera phone produced by Sony Ericsson. It was announced on 5 January 2006 and was the successor of the W800. The W810 is part of Sony Ericsson's Walkman line of mobile phones. It became one of the most iconic Walkman phones, known for its blend of music and mobile technology, setting the standard for future music-oriented handsets.

== Features ==
While being similar to the W800, the W810 benefited from several improvements. Most notably are quad band connectivity, EDGE support for faster wireless data transfers, a light level sensor, a slightly enhanced display, but slightly reduced battery life.

Other features include a web browser, two megapixel digital camera with autofocus and flash, the HPM-70 stereo headset, Memory Stick PRO Duo slot, 20 MB of internal memory, and a music-only mode where phone functions are fully turned off, which also allows the phone to be used as a Walkman in areas mobile phones would usually be barred from, such as airplanes and hospitals, in addition to providing longer battery-life. The phone supported MP3, AMR, MIDI, IMY, EMY, WAV (16 kHZ maximum sample rate) and AAC audio formats and MPEG-4 and 3GPP video formats. However WMA audio format is not supported.

While official support for Memory Stick PRO Duo is capped at 4 GB, users have reported using 16 GB sticks with full functionality (read and write), though at larger sizes, some functions (boot time, media playback, and file retrieval, for example) are noticeably slower.

== Cosmetics ==
There were many small cosmetic changes from the W800, but most noticeable is the absence of the classic joystick that has been found on the majority of Sony Ericsson mobile phones since the T68i. This has been replaced by a D-pad designed to improve ease of use when listening to music and to provide a longer life to the keypad (as the classic joystick tended to fail due to dust, especially on some models like the K700). The casing color has changed from burnt orange and cream to “Satin Black” or “Fusion White”. The sliding camera lens cover has also been omitted completely. However, a K750i or W800 back cover (with lens cover) will fit with minor modifications.

== Availability ==
The Sony Ericsson W810 is available as the W810i for Europe, the Middle East, Africa, Asia-Pacific, and North America, and the W810c for mainland China. The W810 was released worldwide in January 2006. A white color variation officially called “Fusion White” was released on 20 June 2006.

== Specifications ==
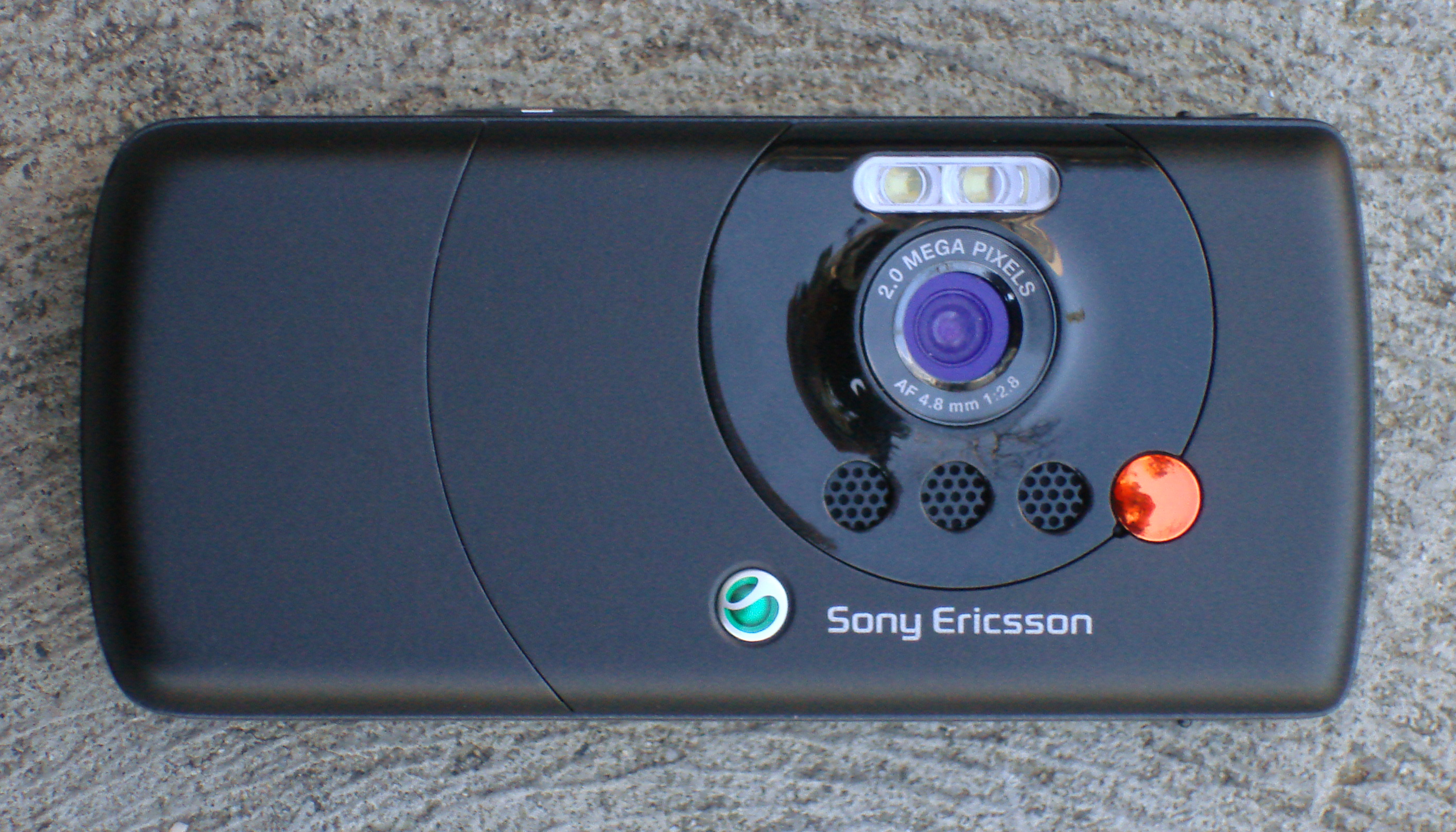
Sony Ericsson W810i rear

Screen

- 1.9-inches, 176×220 pixels
- 262,144 colour TFT-LCD

Memory

- 512 MB Sony Memory Stick PRO Duo included
- Phone memory 20 MB (Actual free memory may vary due to phone pre-configuration)
- Memory Stick PRO Duo support (up to 4 GB officially)

Networks

- GSM 850
- GSM 900
- GSM 1800
- GSM 1900
- EDGE

Available colors

- Satin Black
- Fusion White (limited market availability)

Size

- 100 × 46 × 19 mm (3.9 × 1.8 × 0.7 inches)

Weight

- 99 g (3.5 oz)

Camera

- 2 MP
- AF 4.8 mm 1:2.8
