= Sony Ericsson K770 =

Mobile phone model

Sony Ericsson K770i
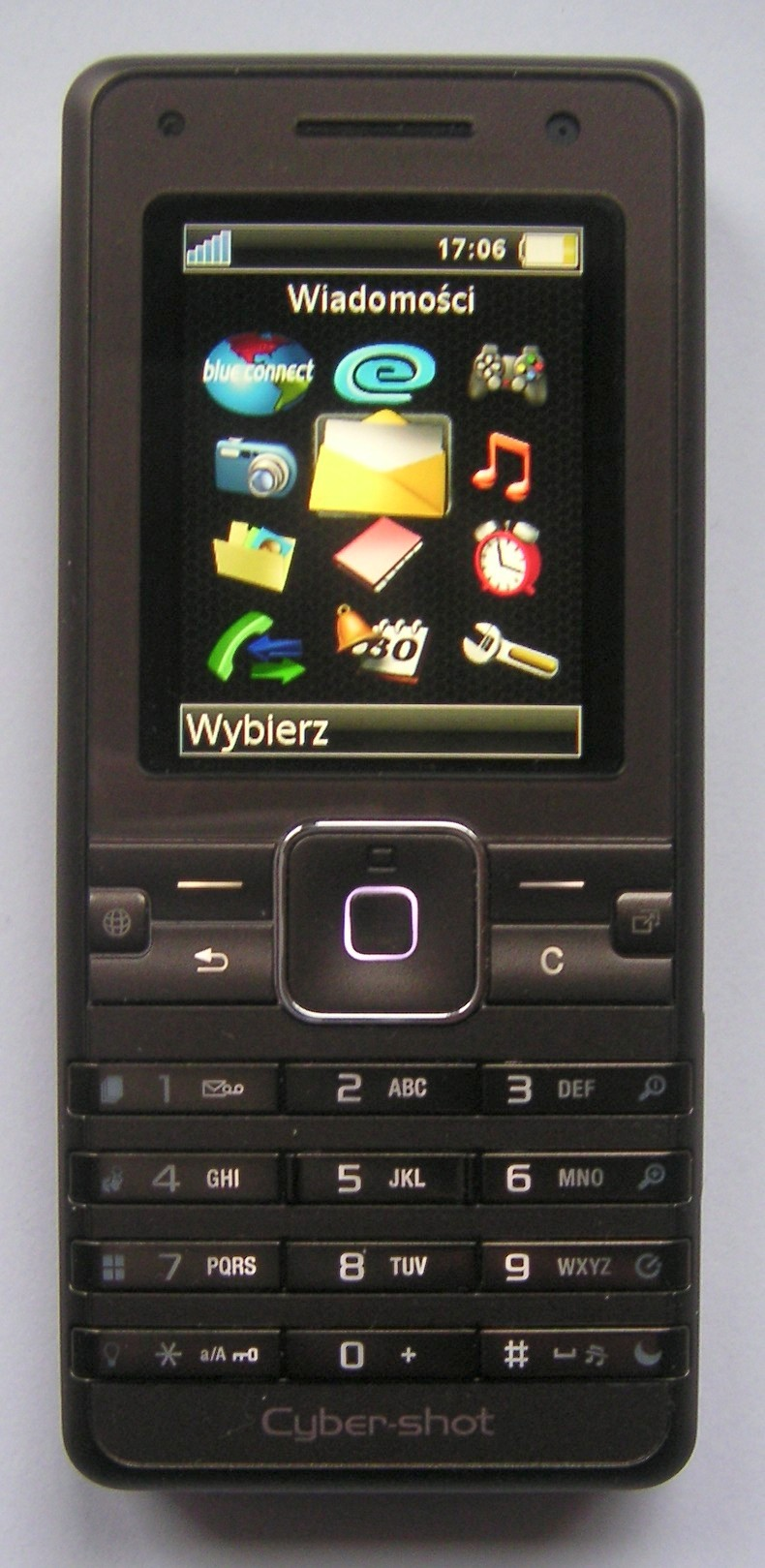
- Availability by region: September 2007
- Compatible networks: 3G, GSM 900/1800/1900
- Form factor: Candybar
- Dimensions: 105×47×14.5 mm (4.13×1.85×0.57 in)
- Weight: 95 g
- Memory: 32 MB Internal, 1 Memory Stick Micro (M2) slot, 256MB Memory Stick Micro (M2) included
- Rear camera: 3.2 megapixel with AF
- Front camera: 0.3 megapixel (Video Calling Camera)
- Display: 240x320 pixels (QCIF+), 262,144 (18-bit) Color TFT LCD
- Connectivity: GPRS, HSCSD, Bluetooth, USB
- Data inputs: Keypad

The Sony Ericsson K770i, was launched by 3 (in the UK) in 2008 in association with girl band Sugababes.

It is a mid-range mobile phone, and successor to the (then) still manufactured K750. As of mid-2009, it has not been directly succeeded in the Sony Ericsson model range.

== Design ==
The K770i is a candybar style phone that weighs 95 grams (3.35 ounces). It has the 'dual-front' design common to most Sony Ericsson mobile phones since the T610, with the back of the mobile phone designed like a digital camera and intended to be held sideways to take photographs. The K770i is available in six distinct colours: black, metallic pink, truffle brown, ultra violet, henna bronze and sandy beige. The central joystick button is used for selecting options and navigating menus, with the "C" button as an 'undo' or 'delete' button, and the arrow-labelled button as a 'return' or 'back' button. The two buttons labelled by white horizontal lines, known as 'hotkeys' or 'soft keys' perform the function of making binary decisions, labelled on the phone's display. The button in between the right 'soft key' and the "C" button acts as a shortcut key, which brings up a user-customisable shortcut menu when pressed. The button in between the left 'soft key' and the 'back' button acts as a shortcut key, which opens the home page in the browser. The on/off button is located on the top of the phone.

On the left hand side of the phone is the connection port for the supplied USB cable which is available to upload photos and other digital files to computers.

On the right-hand side of the phone there are three keys - two for controlling volume (when in audio mode), skipping through tracks in the Media Player and zooming in and out when in camera mode after the photograph has been taken. The included handsfree headset is also required to listen to the radio since it functions as the antenna.

== Connectivity ==
The phone can also be used as a modem via Bluetooth or USB. According to the o2 website, the K770 has a talk time battery life of 16 hours and a standby time battery life of 384 hours.

== Date bug ==
On some versions such as firmware R8BC004 there is a bug in the internal clock, which does not recognise leap days from 2016 onwards. Attempting to set the date to 29 February 2016, for example, results in the time and date becoming corrupted, and it becomes impossible to reset the date, until the phone is shut down and restarted.
