= Sony Mobile =

Former Japanese or Swedish-Japanese telecommunications company

Sony Mobile Communications Inc.
- Top: Sony Ericsson logo used from 2001 to 2012; Bottom: Sony logo used from 2012 to 2021
- Native name: ソニーモバイルコミュニケーションズ株式会社
- Formerly: Sony Ericsson (2001–2012)
- Type: Subsidiary
- Industry: Telecommunications
- Predecessor: Ericsson Mobile Communications
- Founded: October 1, 2001; 25 years ago
- Defunct: April 1, 2021; 5 years ago
- Fate: Merged with Sony
- Headquarters: London, England (2001–2012); Lund, Sweden (2012); Shinagawa, Tokyo, Japan (2012–2021)
- Key people: Katsumi Ihara (president, 2001–2004); Miles Flint (president, 2004–2007); Hideki Komiyama (president, 2007–2009); Bert Nordberg (president, 2009–2012); Kunimasa Suzuki (president, 2012–2014); Hiroki Totoki (president, 2014–2018); Mitsuya Kishida (president, 2018–2021)
- Parent: Sony; Ericsson (2001–2012)

Sony Ericsson Mobile Communications AB, was a Swedish-Japanese multinational consumer electronics and telecommunications company, best known for its mobile phone products. The company, originally a joint venture between Sony and Ericsson, marketed products under the "Sony Ericsson" brand from 2001 until 2012, when Ericsson sold its share to Sony, with products hereafter being branded as "Sony". From its inception until 2018, previous presidents of Sony Mobile included Katsumi Ihara, Miles Flint, Hideki Komiyama, Bert Nordberg, Kunimasa Suzuki and Hiroki Totoki. After that, Mitsuya Kishida served as its last president until it was integrated into Sony Corporation in 2021.

The alliance between Swedish telecom giant Ericsson and Japanese electronics giant Sony was formed to help Ericsson Mobile recover against competitors in the mobile phone market, while for Sony it gave the opportunity to grow in the field of cellular communication, where it had only a minor presence. Products and development was done with contributions from both parties: the company itself was based in London, England, with its design centre in Lund, Sweden, and other research and development facilities in Beijing, China; Tokyo, Japan; and San Francisco, United States. The Sony Ericsson T68i was the first GSM phone released under the joint venture since its launch. After the Sony acquisition, the company, now as Sony Mobile, moved its headquarters to Tokyo, Japan.

Some of the most notable phones produced by Sony Ericsson include the T610, the K800i (Cyber-shot branded), the W810 (Walkman-branded), and the Xperia arc S. Sony Ericsson was also the main user of the UIQ smartphone platform, but beginning in 2010 had switched over entirely to Android. After the end of the joint venture, the Xperia sub-brand of Android smartphones would be the only handsets under the Sony brand, although Sony Mobile also developed tablet computers (Xperia Tablet), smartwatches (Sony SmartWatch) and fitness trackers (Sony SmartBand).

At its peak in 2007, Sony Ericsson, Sony Mobile's predecessor, held a 9 percent global mobile phone market share making it the fourth largest vendor at the time. In 2017, Sony Mobile held less than 1% global market share but 4.8% in Europe and 16.3% in Japan.

== History ==
=== Origins ===
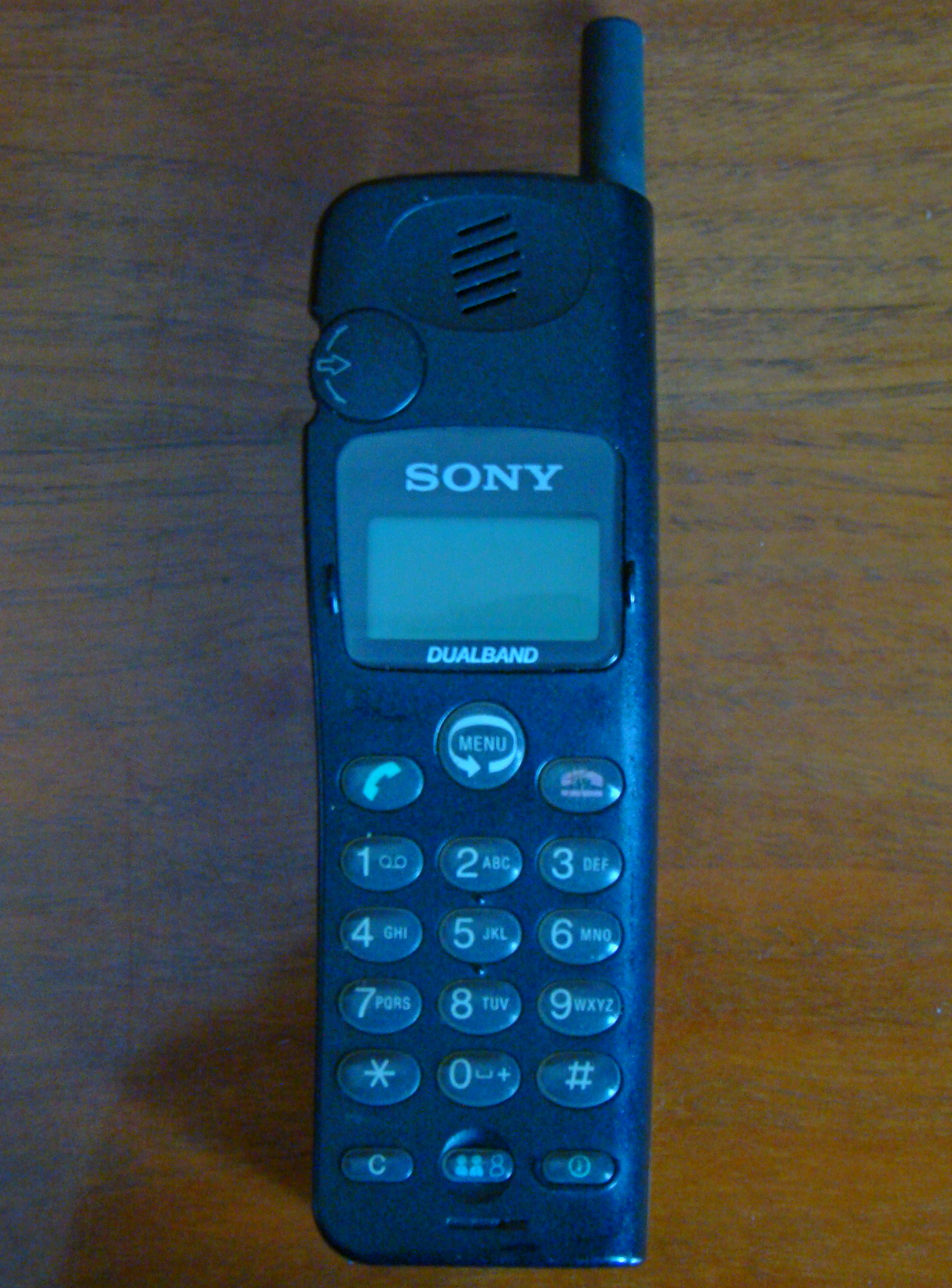
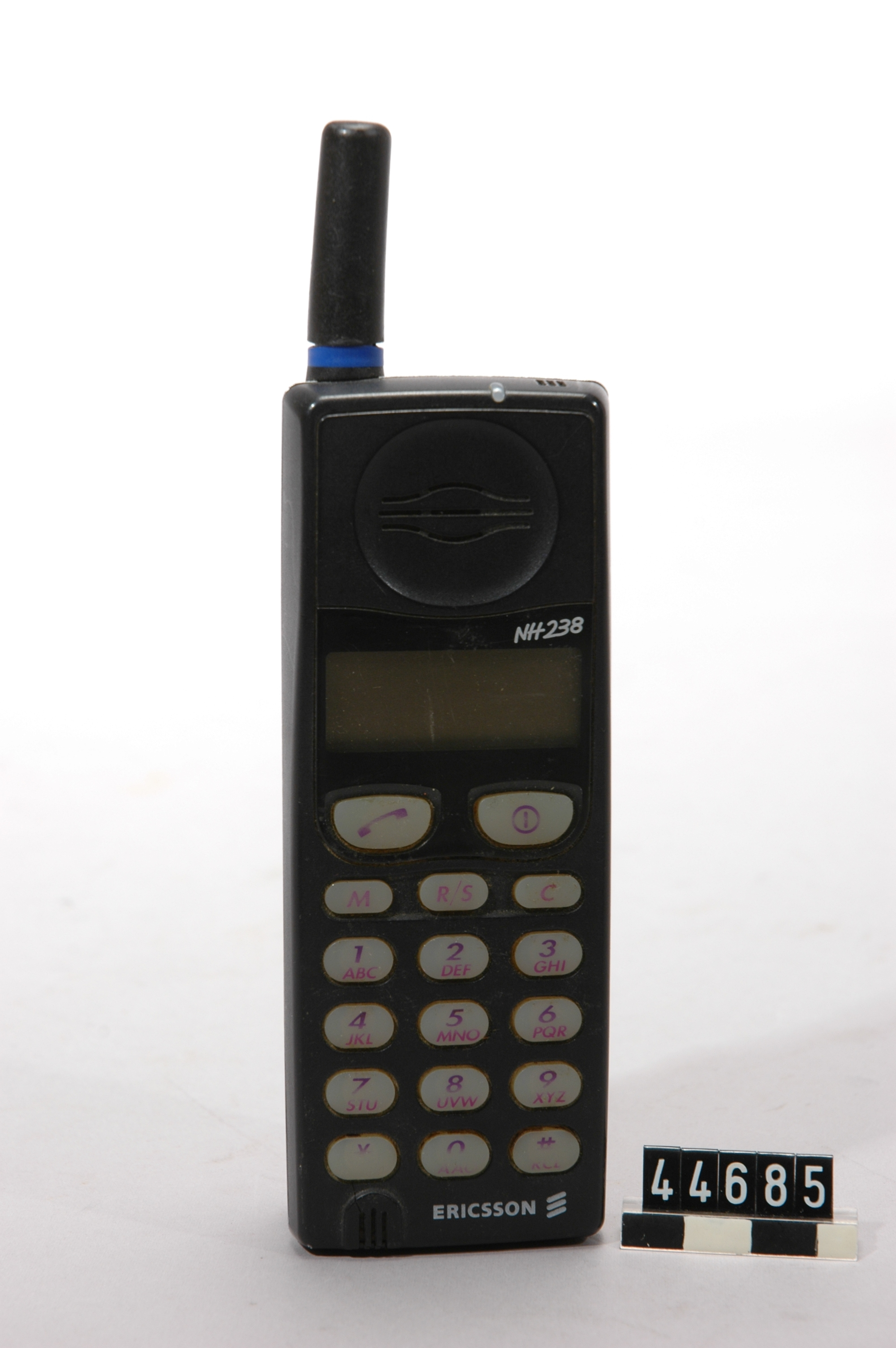
A Sony and an Ericsson mobile phone from before the joint venture

The Swedish company Ericsson had been making mobile cell phones since the 1980s, with their very first handheld device being the Hotline Pocket introduced in 1987. In the United States, Ericsson partnered with General Electric in the early nineties as Ericsson Mobile Communications (ECS), primarily to establish a US presence and brand recognition. General Electric eventually left the joint venture.

Ericsson had decided to obtain chips for its phones from a single source—a Philips facility in New Mexico. On March 17, 2000, a fire at the Philips factory contaminated the sterile facility. Philips assured Ericsson and Nokia (their other major customer) that production would be delayed for no more than a week. When it became clear that production would actually be compromised for months, Ericsson was faced with a serious shortage. Nokia had already begun to obtain parts from alternative sources, but Ericsson's position was much worse as production of current models and the launch of new ones was held up.

Ericsson, which had been in the mobile phone market for decades, and was the world's third largest cellular telephone handset maker at the time behind Nokia and Motorola, was struggling with huge losses and decreasing market share. This was partly due to this fire as well as its inability to produce cheaper phones or fashionably-designed phones like Nokia managed to do. Speculation began about a possible sale by Ericsson of its mobile phone division, but the company's president, Kurt Hellström, said it had no plans to do so. Hellström said, "Mobile phones are really a core business for Ericsson. We wouldn't be as successful (in networks) if we didn't have phones".

Sony was a marginal player in the worldwide mobile phone market with a share of less than 1 percent in 2000. By August 2001, the two companies had finalised the terms of the merger announced in April. Ericsson contributed a majority of the Ericsson Mobile Communications company, excluding a minor part spun off as Ericsson Mobile Platforms. Sony contributed its entire handset division. The company was to have an initial workforce of 3,500 employees.

1997-2001 worldwide mobile phone manufacturers shipments (in 000s)
	1	2	3	4	5
1997	Motorola	Nokia	Ericsson		
1997	25,328	20,593	15,914		
1998	Nokia	Motorola	Ericsson		
1998	37,374 (+81.5%)	32,319 (+27.6%)	23,827 (+49.7%)		
1999	Nokia	Motorola	Ericsson		
1999	76,335 (+97.5%)	47,817 (+43.3%)	29,785 (+14.8%)		
2000	Nokia	Motorola	Ericsson		
2000	126.4 (+60.4%)	60,000 (+79.7%)	41,000 (+72.6%)		
2001	Nokia	Motorola	Siemens	Samsung	Ericsson
2001	139.7 (+10.5%)	59,100 (-1.7%)	29,800 (+10.2%)	28,200 (+36.8%)	27,000 (-35.0%)

=== 2001 to 2010 ===
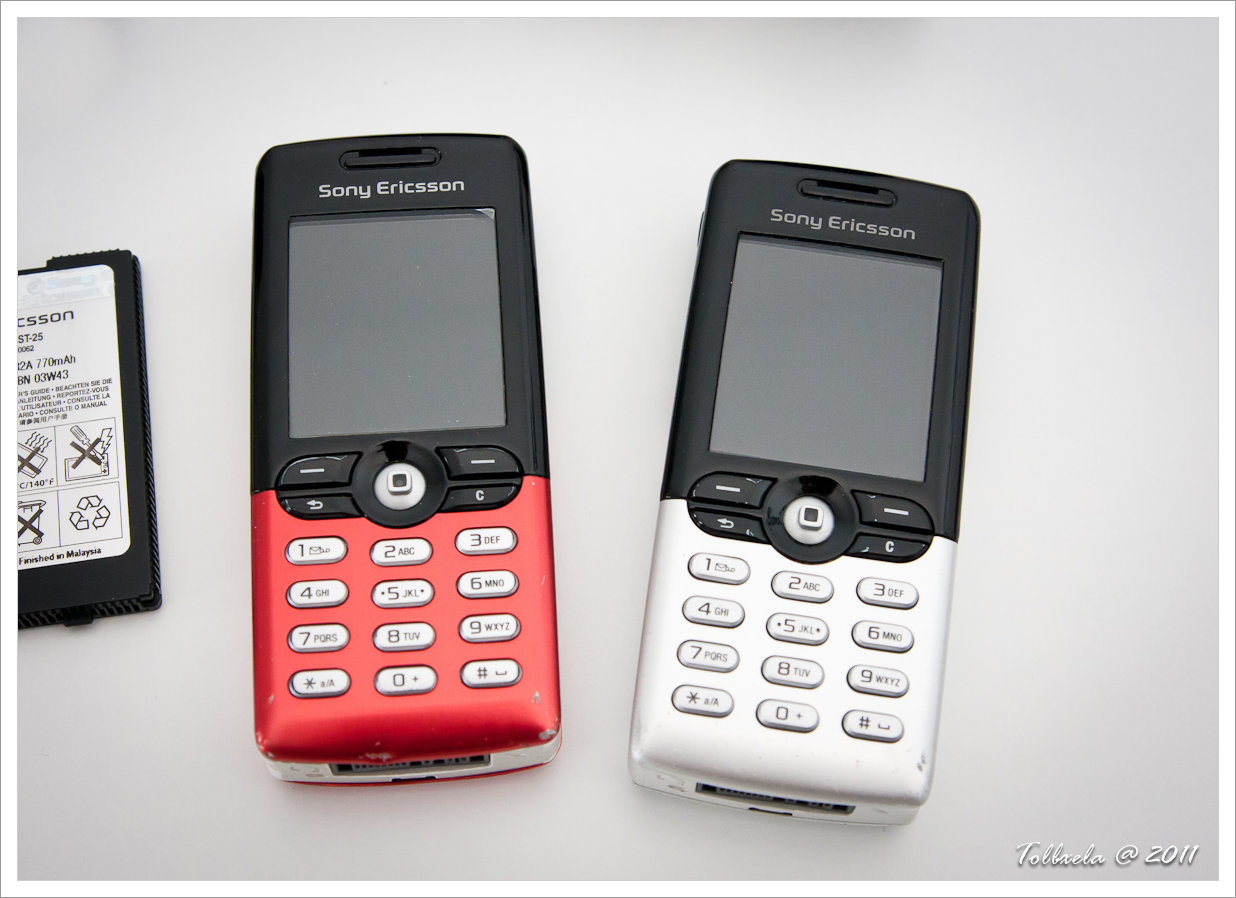
Sony Ericsson T610, the company's first hit product

Sony Ericsson's strategy was to release new models capable of digital photography as well as other multimedia capabilities such as downloading and viewing video clips and personal information management capabilities. To this end, it released several new models which had built-in digital camera and colour screen which were novelties at that time - examples include the Sony Ericsson T610, the P800 UIQ smartphone, and later the K700 handset. The joint venture continued to make bigger losses in spite of booming sales - however it paid off as Sony Ericsson made its first profit in 2003 and in the following years steadily increased handset sales. The joint venture was regarded to have been a success.

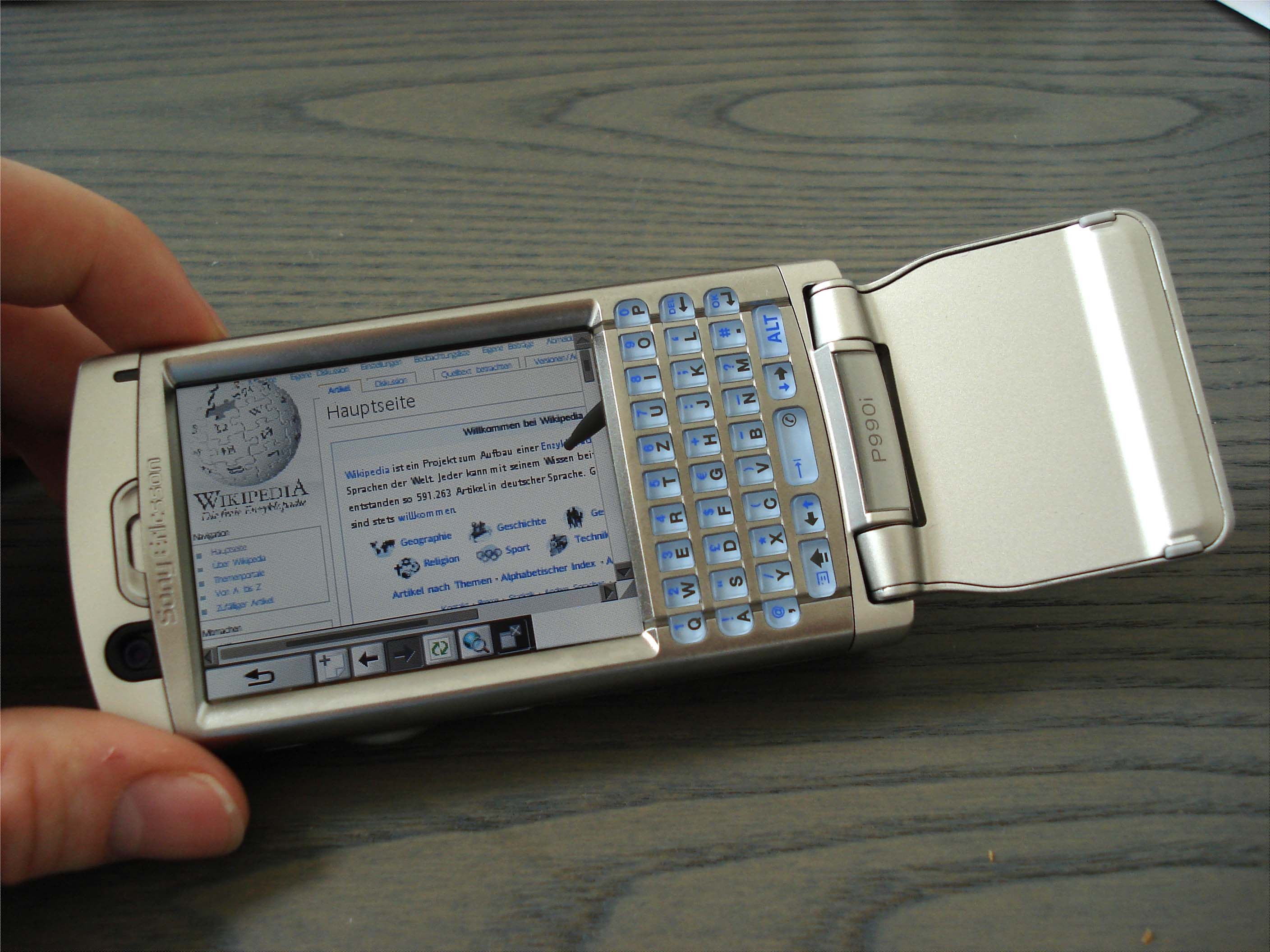
Sony Ericsson P990i

In 2005, Sony Ericsson introduced the K750i with a 2 megapixel camera, as well as its platform mate, the W800i, the first of the Walkman phones capable of 30 hours of music playback. Later in October 2005, Sony Ericsson presented the first mobile phone based on UIQ 3, the P990.

Also in 2005, Sony Ericsson agreed to become the global title sponsor for the WTA Tour in a deal worth $88 million US dollars over 6 years. The women's pro tennis circuit was renamed the Sony Ericsson WTA Tour. Just over a month later on June 7, it announced sponsorship of West Indian batsmen Chris Gayle and Ramnaresh Sarwan.

In 2007, the company's first 5-Megapixel camera phone, the Sony Ericsson K850i, was announced followed in 2008 by the C905, the world's first 8.1-Megapixel camera phone. At Mobile World Congress 2009, Sony Ericsson unveiled the first 12-Megapixel camera phone, named Satio.

On January 2, 2009, Sony Ericsson announced in Stockholm that it would have some of its mobile phones made in India, and that its two outsourcing partners, Flextronics and Foxconn would manufacture ten million mobile phones per year by 2009. CEO Miles Flint announced at a press conference held with India's communications minister Dayanidhi Maran in Chennai that India was one of the fastest growing markets in the world and a priority market for Sony Ericsson with 105 million users of GSM mobile telephones.

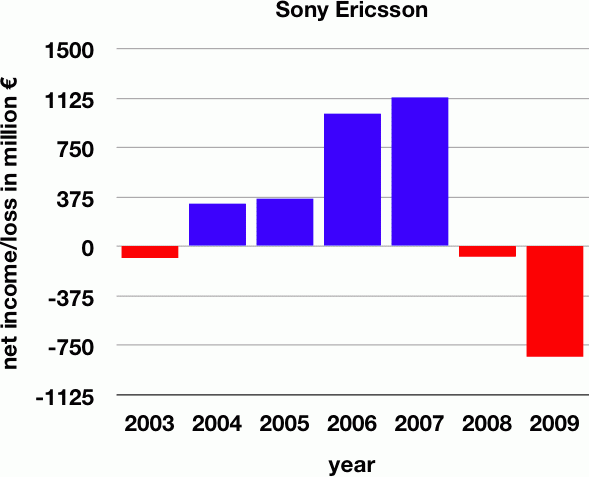
Annual net income or loss 2003 to 2009

Sony Ericsson's handset shipments fell from a high of 30.8m in Q4 1999 to only 8.1m in Q1 2003. The company had made net losses in six of the 15 quarters and seen its cash reserves shrink from €2.2bn to €599m, after taking a €375m cash injection from its joint owners. The eclipse of the Symbian operating system, initially by Apple's iPhone, and then by Google's Android, has affected Sony Ericsson's position in the market. The company also struggled following the launch of Apple's iPhone in the third quarter of 2007.

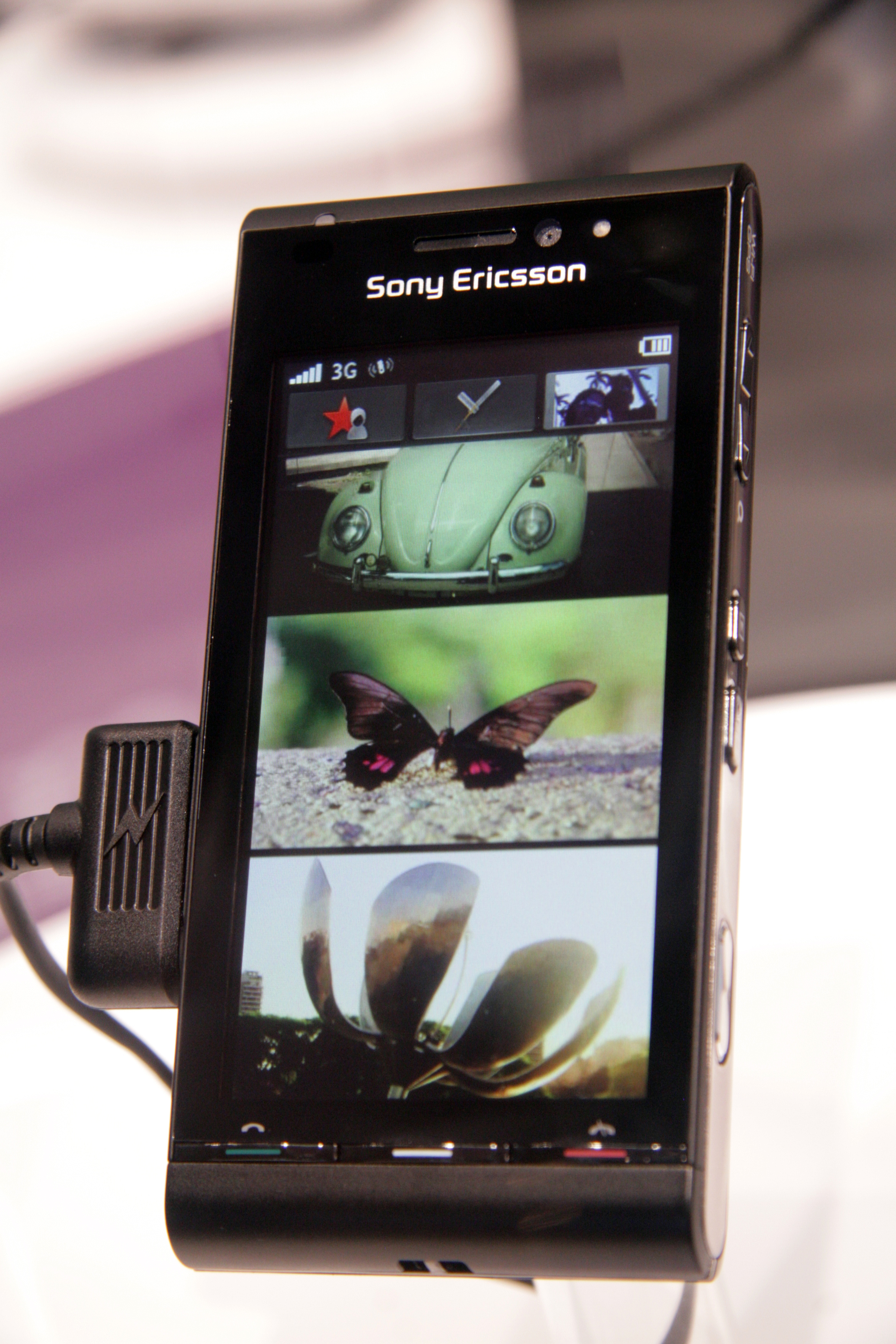
Sony Ericsson Satio

Sony Ericsson was overtaken by its South Korean rival LG Electronics in Q1 2008. Sony Ericsson's company's profits fell significantly by 43% to €133 million (approx. US$180 million), sales falling by 8% and market share falling from 9.4% to 7.9%, despite favourable conditions that the handset market was expected to grow by 10% in 2008. Sony Ericsson announced another profit warning in June 2008 and saw net profit crash by 97% in Q2 2008, announcing that it would cut 2,000 jobs, leading to wide fear that Sony Ericsson was on the verge of decline along with its struggling rival, Motorola. In Q3 the profits were much on the same level, however November and December saw increased profits along with new models being released such as the C905 being one of the top sellers across the United Kingdom.

In June 2008, Sony Ericsson had about 8,200 employees, it then launched a cost-cutting program and by the end of 2009 it had slashed its global workforce by around 5,000 people. It has also closed R&D centres in Chadwick House, Birchwood (Warrington) in the UK; Miami, Seattle, San Diego and RTP (Raleigh, NC) in the USA; The Chennai Unit (Tamil Nadu) in India; Hässleholm and Kista in Sweden and operations in the Netherlands. The UIQ centres in London and Budapest were also closed, UIQ was a joint venture with Motorola which began life in the 1990s.

=== 2011 to 2020 ===
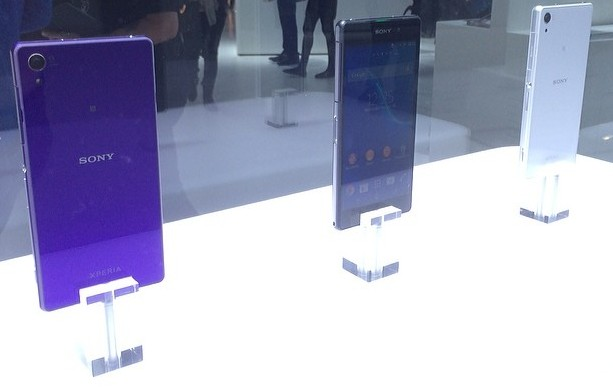
Sony Xperia Z2, released in 2014, is Sony Mobile's former flagship device.

On October 27, 2011, Sony announced that it would acquire Ericsson's stake in Sony Ericsson for €1.05 billion ($1.47 billion), making the mobile handset business a wholly owned subsidiary of Sony. The transaction's completion was expected to occur in January 2012. At their keynote at the 2012 Consumer Electronics Show, Sony's Kaz Hirai announced that the Sony Ericsson Mobile Communications name would be shortened to Sony Mobile Communications pending completion of the transaction. On January 26, 2012, the European Union approved the buyout. On February 16, 2012, Sony announced it had completed the full acquisition of Sony Ericsson. On January 7, 2013, Sony Mobile completed moving its headquarters from Lund, Sweden to Tokyo, Japan in order to fully integrate with its parent company. Since the acquisition, the first Sony-only mobile was the Sony Xperia S at the 2012 Consumer Electronics Show. In May 2012, Sony Mobile Communications announced that it would phase out all the feature (non-smart) phones in favor of "smartphones" by September 2012.

Sony Mobile was the fourth-largest smartphone manufacturer by market share in the fourth quarter of 2012 with 9.8 million units shipped.

On July 2, 2012, Sony announced it was buying Gaikai, a cloud service to support its expansion into the cloud gaming realm. Sony paid a reported $380 million to acquire Gaikai. The Sony Ericsson Liquid Energy Logo, which was the hallmark logo used on Sony Mobile products up until the 2012 series of phones, was replaced with a new power button designed as the new signature hallmark to easily identify a Sony phone and this debuted with the 2013 series of Xperia mobile phones. The last phones to feature the Liquid Energy logo were the Sony Xperia T and Sony Xperia TX, and the first phones without featuring it were the Sony Xperia J and Sony Xperia V. Both were unveiled at the IFA 2012. At the 2013 Consumer Electronics Show the Sony Xperia Z and Sony Xperia ZL were announced, followed by the Sony Xperia Z1, unveiled during a press conference in IFA 2013, the Sony Xperia Z2 during the 2014 Mobile World Congress in Barcelona, Spain, and the Sony Xperia Z3 in IFA 2014.

On October 30, 2014, Sony announced that Senior Vice President of Corporate Planning, Finance and New Business Creation Department Hiroki Totoki will replace Kunimasa Suzuki as president and CEO of Sony Mobile Communications with effect from November 16, 2014. Suzuki subsequently became the Group Executive of Sony Corporation after his departure from Sony Mobile Communications.

In the last quarter of 2015, Sony Mobile had the highest per-handset-profit and average selling price of all major Android handset manufacturers. However, in terms of market share, Sony Mobile dropped out of the top 10 smartphone vendors globally for the first time in the first quarter of the year.

Sony Mobile has been the only major smartphone OEM that has given support to developing communities of smaller, hacker-focused mobile operating systems during this time. In 2013 Sony released an experimental Firefox OS ROM for the Sony Xperia E device. In 2017 Sony got Sailfish OS into its Open Devices program. As a result, the Sailfish software has been officially ported to many Xperia devices.

As of Q2 2018, Sony Mobile's smartphone market share in Japan was 12.5%, behind Apple and Sharp.

On March 26, 2020, Sony announced that it will establish an intermediate holding company "Sony Electronics Corporation" effective April 1, 2020. Sony Electronics Corporation will incorporate the three businesses that comprise its Electronics Products & Solutions ("EP&S") segment (Imaging Products & Solutions, Home Entertainment & Sound, and Mobile Communications) and related global sales and marketing, manufacturing, logistics, procurement and engineering platforms.

== Operations ==
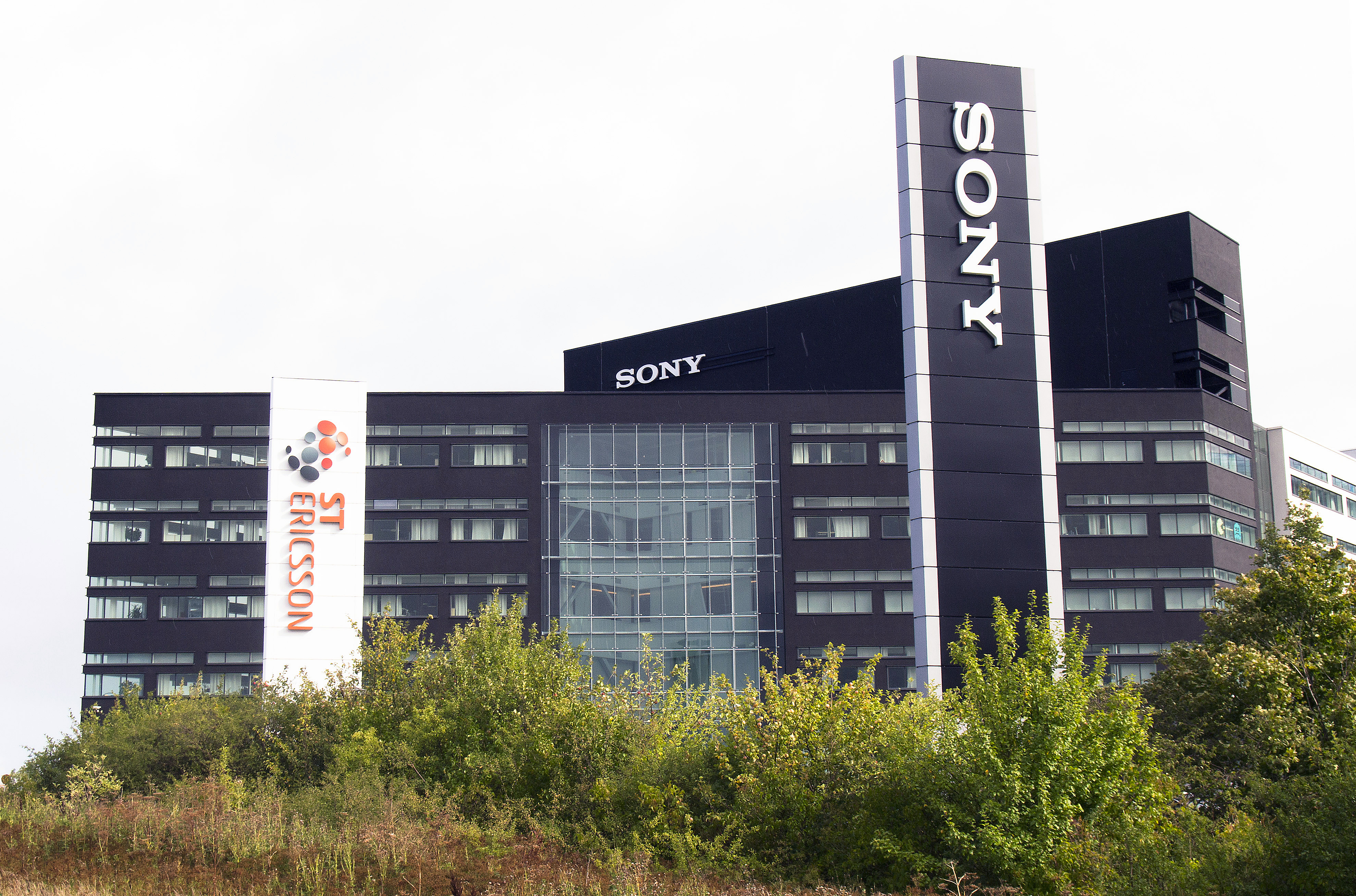
Sony Mobile (and ST-Ericsson) offices in Lund, Sweden

In 2009, Sony Ericsson announced that it was moving its North American headquarters from Research Triangle Park, North Carolina, to Atlanta. The headquarters move was part of a plan to reduce its workforce, then 10,000 employees, by 20%. As of that year, Sony Ericsson had 425 employees in Research Triangle Park; the staff had been reduced by hundreds due to layoffs. Stacy Doster, a spokesperson of Sony Ericsson, said that the proximity to Hartsfield-Jackson Atlanta International Airport's flights to Latin America and the operations of AT&T Mobility influenced the decision to move the USA headquarters. Sony Ericsson will close the Research Triangle site. On August 23, 2012, Sony announced heavy cuts of their work force in Lund, Sweden. In September 2014, Sony announced taking a €1.3 billion impairment charge on the Sony Mobile division and cutting another 15% of jobs - equivalenting about 1000 employees - at Sony Mobile.

== Products ==
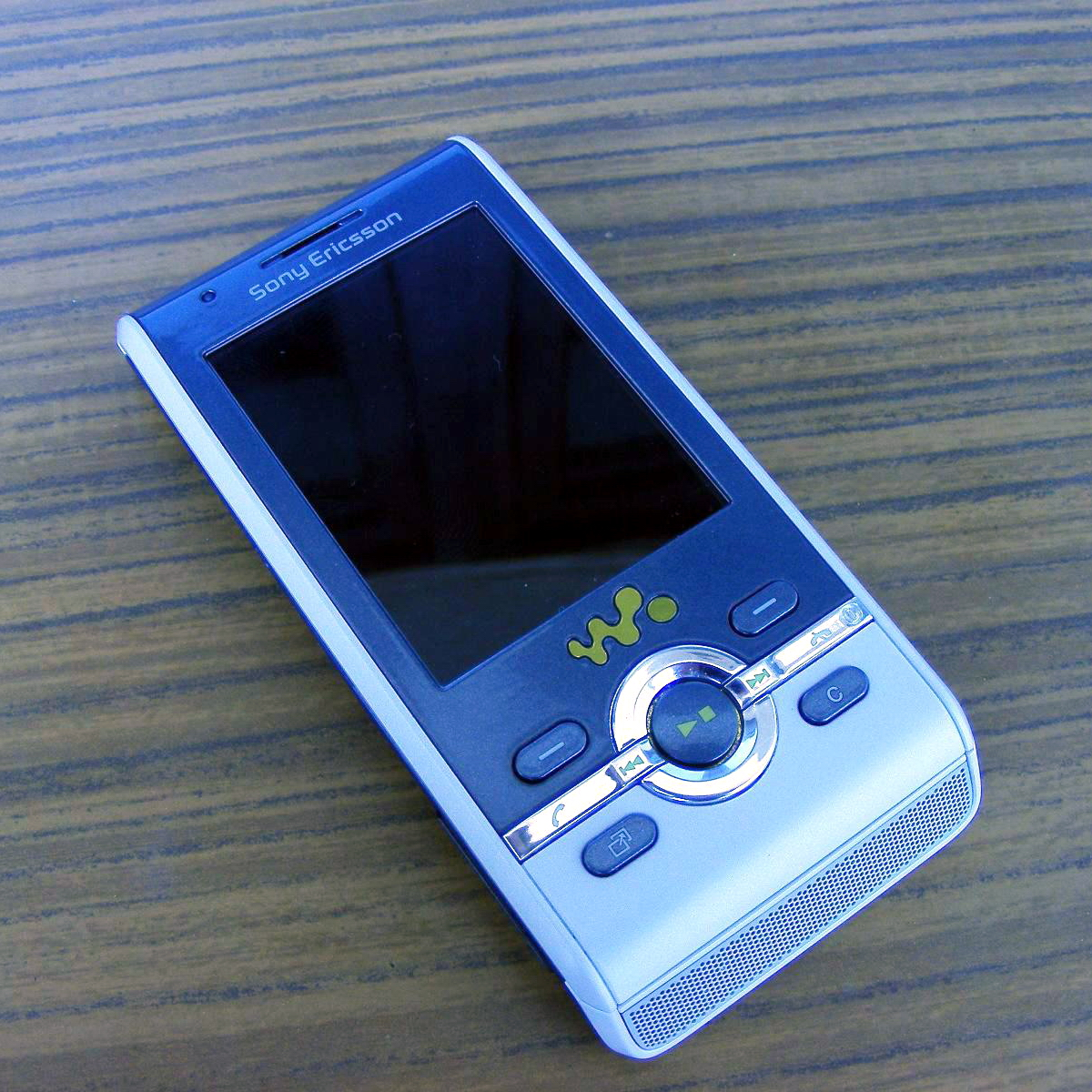
A Sony Ericsson W595s mobile phone

=== Sony Ericsson smartphones ===
Sony Ericsson (originally Ericsson) was part of the Symbian Ltd. consortium and supported the UIQ pen-based touch interface for Symbian OS. The first Sony Ericsson UIQ smartphone was the Sony Ericsson P800 in 2002. Sony Ericsson joined the Symbian Foundation in 2008 and soon UIQ Technology went bankrupt - the Sony Ericsson Satio was released in 2009 running on Symbian^1, which would be succeeded by Sony Ericsson Vivaz in 2010. For the Japanese market, Sony Ericsson also produced Linux and Symbian-based MOAP handsets for NTT DoCoMo, as well as REX OS for au/KDDI.

Sony Ericsson launched their first Windows Mobile device in 2008, the Xperia X1, at the 2008 Mobile World Congress in Barcelona, which carried the Windows Mobile operating system with a Sony Ericsson panel interface and was manufactured by HTC. They would further develop two more Windows Mobile devices: Sony Ericsson Xperia X2 and Sony Ericsson Aspen in 2010. By this time, Sony Ericsson switched all its focus on Google's Android operating system. The company's CEO did confirm a Sony Ericsson Windows Phone device called "Jolie" for 2011. A prototype exists and was leaked on the internet in 2011, but no Windows Phone device was ever released.

There was also a line of BRAVIA-branded clamshell smartphones that were released for the Japanese market between 2007 and 2010.

Since 2012 all products by Sony Mobile have been in the Xperia range and running the Android OS - the Xperia X10 model launched in 2010 was the first to feature this. In 2011 Sony Ericsson carried a range of mid and high-end Android smartphones all using the same SoC, only differentiating in form factor, screen size and multimedia capabilities. Although in 2012 the phones already carried the Sony brand on them, they were still (mostly) developed by Sony Ericsson, as can be seen from the green logo on the back of handsets like the Xperia S and Xperia T.

=== Sony smartphones (Xperia) ===
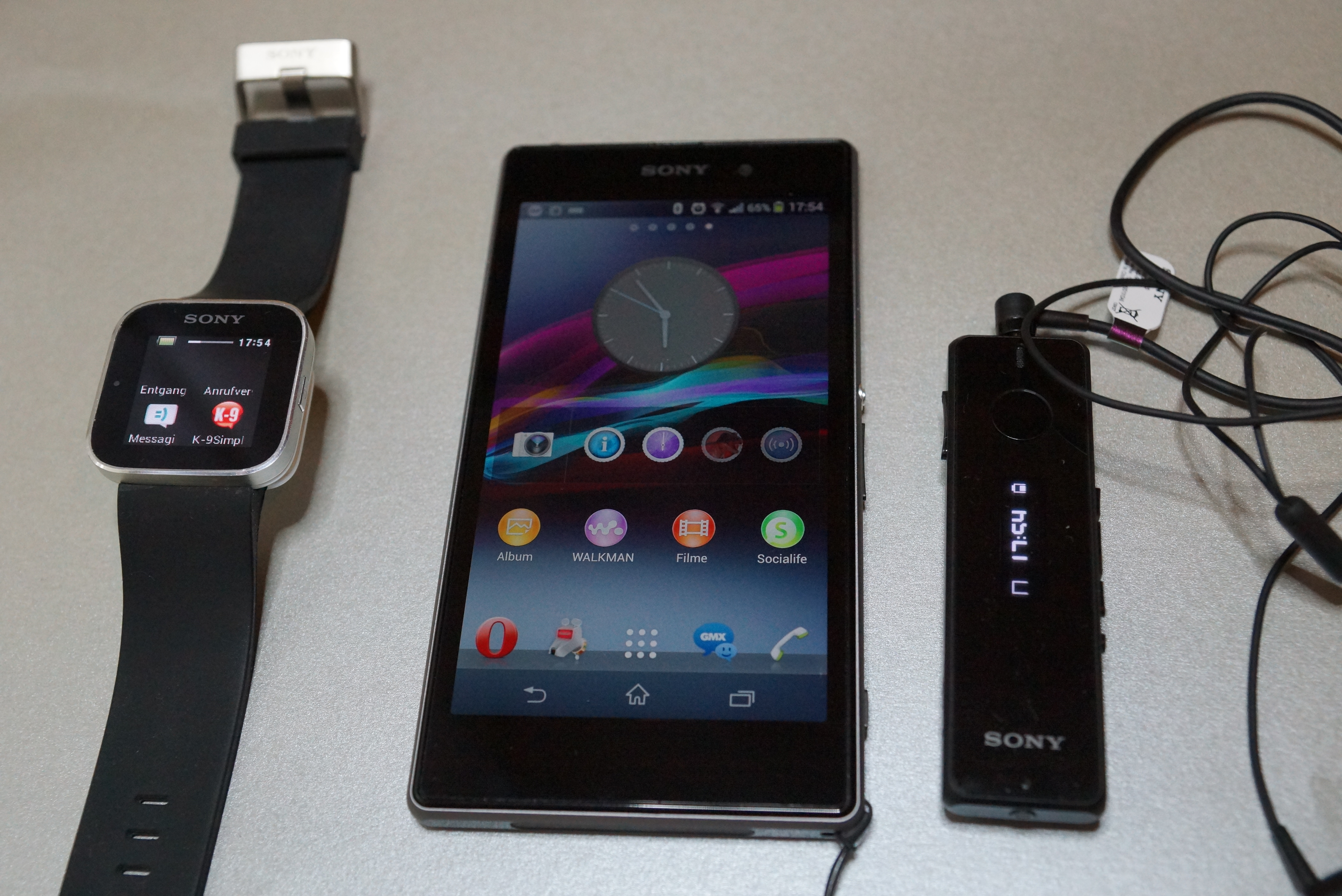
A Sony SmartWatch wearable with an Xperia Z1 smartphone and a Smart Bluetooth Handset

The line-up in 2013 brought an entirely different design of phones, first seen on the Xperia Z smartphone, and called 'OmniBalance' (roughly translated as 'balance everywhere') by Sony. In 2014 Sony stated to be focusing more on the high-end phone market and reducing the number of low and mid-end products. The first model launched in 2015 was the Xperia Z3+, featuring updated internals in a body similar to the Xperia Z3.

In 2016, Sony introduced the Xperia X series at MWC 2016 to replace the Z series. The last device to launch under the Xperia X series was the Xperia XZ3, a flagship device released in late-2018 featuring an OLED display, a first for Sony smartphones, then it got replaced by the number series introduced on the Xperia 1 in 2019.

=== Wearables ===
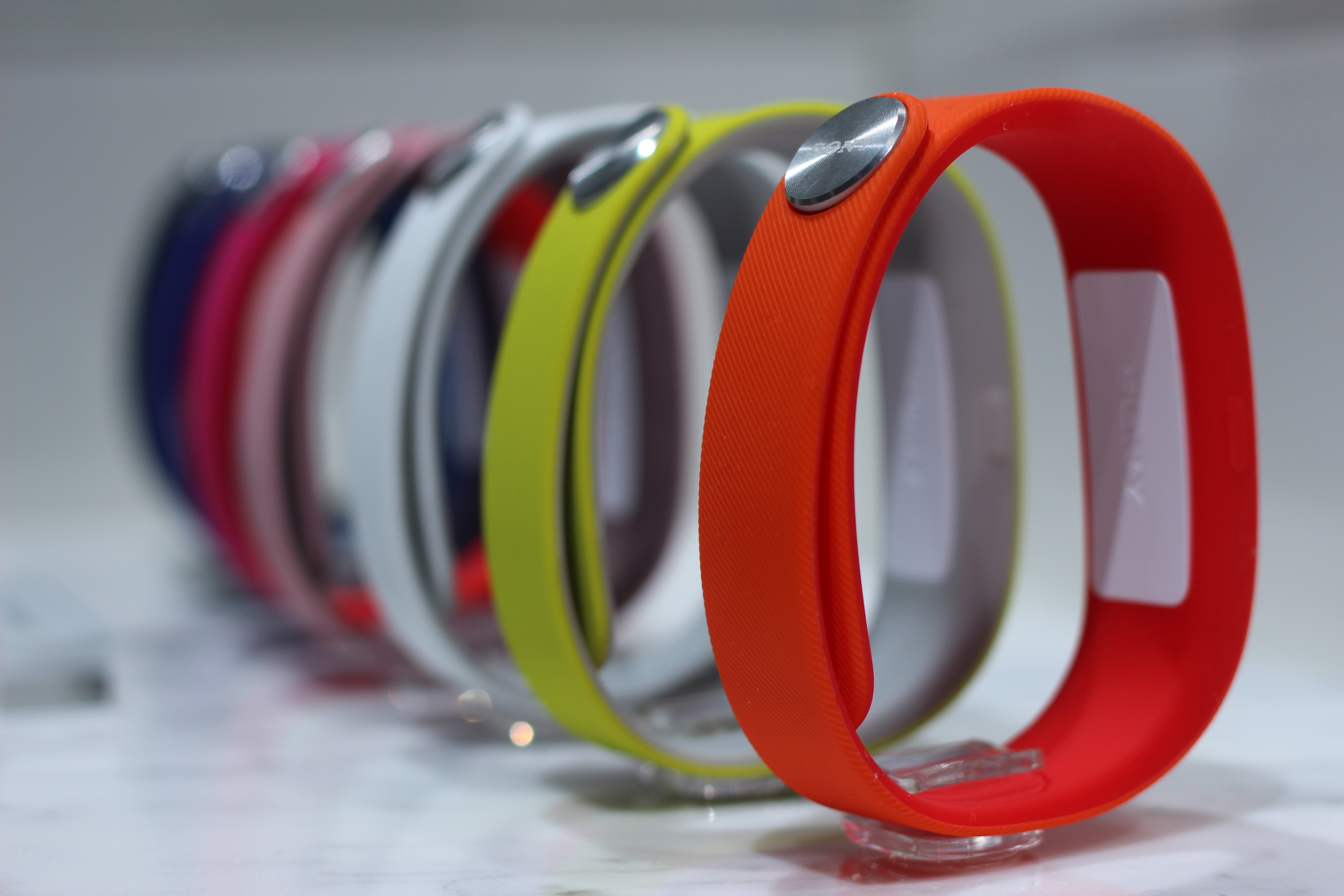
Sony SmartBands on display

Sony (then Sony Ericsson) has been making Bluetooth enabled watches from as early as 2006. In 2010 the LiveView smartwatch was launched, featuring a colour OLED display that let the user view notifications and control the music player. Its successor was the Sony SmartWatch in 2012, of which two newer revisions have been made since.

In 2014 a fitness tracking band, named SmartBand, was introduced. The device's data is accessed using an Android application named Lifelog, which presents statistics about their everyday activities. In 2015, a successor to the SmartBand was introduced, named SmartBand 2, which can track user's heart rate, movements, sleep, and the moments they are calm or excited.

=== PlayStation Certified ===
In 2011, Sony Ericsson announced the first PlayStation Certified phone, the Xperia Play which meant that it had access to PlayStation Mobile games. The previously released Sony Ericsson Xperia Arc and Xperia acro became the next PlayStation Certified devices followed by the Sony Xperia S, Xperia ion and other Sony Tablets.

=== Applications ===
Sony Mobile offers a wide range of applications, ranging from music and videos to camera and gaming apps. Some of Sony Mobile's most popular apps include:

- Cinema Pro - premium video recording application co-developed with CineAlta engineers.
- Photo Pro - a photography app that gives you Alpha-like manual controls.
- Game Enhancer - makes gameplay much more convenient with various functions.
- Lifelog - activity tracking and fitness app designed for Android devices.
- PlayStation Video - online film and television programme distribution service that first was offered by Sony Entertainment Network.
- PS3 or PS4 Remote Play - Remote Play allows PS3 or PS4 games to be played on Xperia smartphones and tablets.

=== Former products ===
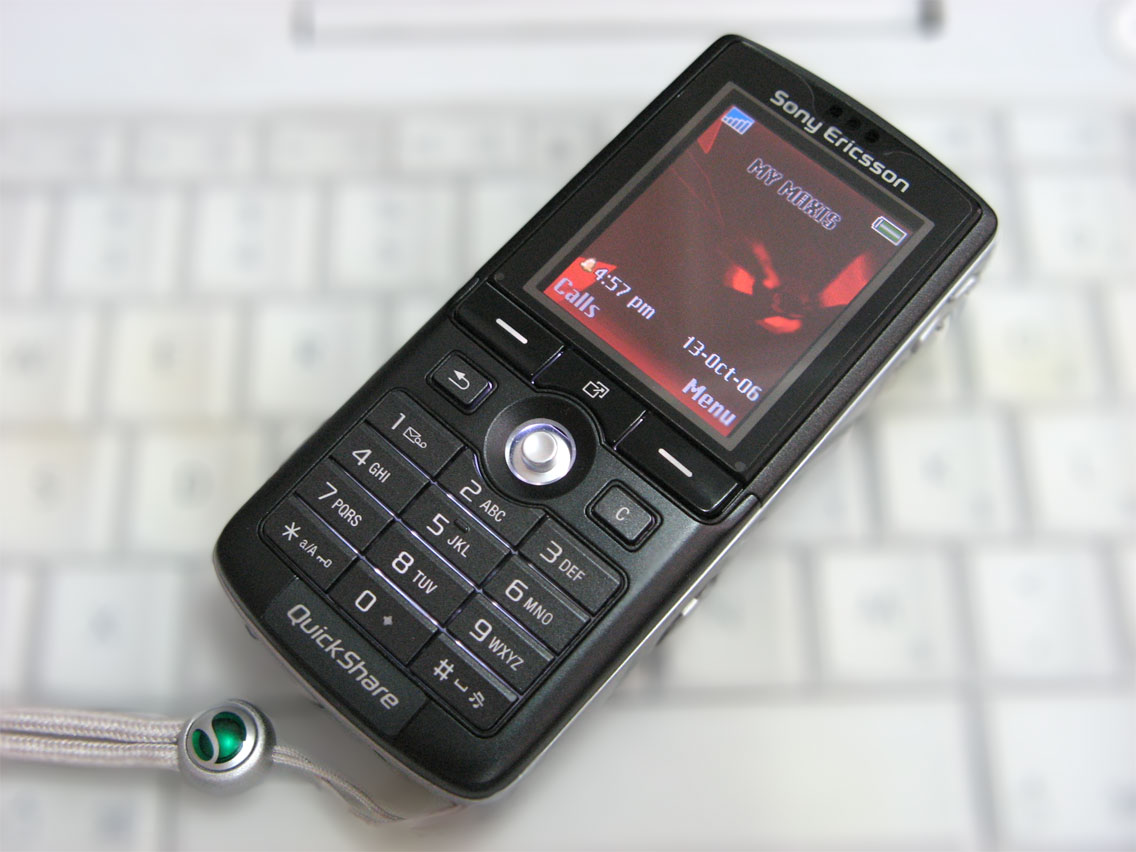
Sony Ericsson K750i, released 2005

- PlayNow - Mobile Store for applications and themes
- Xperia Lounge - music, film and mobile entertainment app.
- TrackID - mobile music and audio recognition service.
- BRAVIA range - launched 2007 in Japan. To date, five BRAVIA branded phones have been produced: Sony Ericsson (FOMA SO903iTV, FOMA SO906i, U1, S004, and S005).
- The Walkman-branded W series music phones, launched in 2005. The Sony Ericsson W-series music phones were notable for being the first music-centric series mobile phones. A notable feature was a 'W' button, which when pressed opens the media centre.
- The Cyber-shot-branded line of phones, launched in 2006 in newer models of the K series phones. This range of phones are focused on the quality of the camera included with the phone. Cyber-shot phones always include a flash, some with a xenon flash, and also include auto-focus cameras. Sony Ericsson kicked off its global marketing campaign for Cyber-shot phone with the launch of 'Never Miss a Shot'. In February 2008, the series was expanded with the announcement of C702, C902 and C905 phones.
- The UIQ smartphone range of mobiles, introduced with the P series in 2003 with the introduction of P800. They are notable for their touchscreens, QWERTY keypads (on most models), and use of the UIQ interface platform for Symbian OS. The range was subsequently expanded with the M series and G series.
- The GreenHeart range - first introduced in 2009 with the Sony Ericsson J105i Naite and C901 GreenHeart. Focused on an environmentally friendly theme, it mainly used eco-friendly materials and featured eco-apps.

== Sales units ==
All these sales figures have been retrieved from Sony's Corporate Website.
Financial / Fiscal Year	Q1 (April - June)	Q2 (July - September)	Q3 (October - December)	Q4 (January - March)	Total official sales figure
2001–02	N.A.	N.A.	6.8 Million Units	5.8 Million Units	
2002–03	5 Million Units	5 Million Units	7.1 Million Units	5.4 Million Units	22.5 Million Units
2003–04	6.7 Million Units	7.1 Million Units	8.0 Million Units	8.8 Million Units	30.6 Million Units
2004–05	10.4 Million Units	10.7 Million Units	12.6 Million Units	9.4 Million Units	43.1 Million Units
2005–06	11.8 Million Units	13.8 Million Units	16.1 Million Units	13.4 Million Units	55.1 Million Units
2006–07	15.7 Million Units	19.8 Million Units	26 Million Units	21.8 Million Units	83.3 Million Units
2007–08	24.9 Million Units	25.9 Million Units	30.8 Million Units	22.3 Million Units	103.9 Million Units
2008–09	24.4 Million Units	25.7 Million Units	24.2 Million Units	14.5 Million Units	88.8 Million Units
2009–10	13.8 Million Units	14.1 Million Units	14.6 Million Units	10.5 Million Units	53 Million Units
2010–11	2.0 Million Units	3.4 Million Units	3.6 Million Units	3.5 Million Units	12.5 Million Units
2011–12	3.5 Million Units	6.0 Million Units	6.0 Million Units	7.0 Million Units	22.5 Million Units
2012–13	7.4 Million Units	8.8 Million Units	8.7 Million Units	8.1 Million Units	33.0 Million Units
2013–14	9.6 Million Units	10.0 Million Units	10.7 Million Units	8.8 Million Units	39.1 Million Units
2014–15	9.4 Million Units	9.9 Million Units	11.9 Million Units	7.9 Million Units	39.1 Million Units
2015–16	7.2 Million Units	6.7 Million Units	7.6 Million Units	3.4 Million Units	24.9 Million Units
2016–17	3.1 Million Units	3.5 Million Units	5.1 Million Units	2.9 Million Units	14.6 Million Units
2017–18	3.4 Million Units	3.4 Million Units	4.0 Million Units	2.7 Million Units	13.5 Million Units
2018–19	2.0 Million Units	1.6 Million Units	1.8 Million Units	1.1 Million Units	6.5 Million Units
2019–20	0.9 Million Units	0.6 Million Units	1.3 Million Units	0.4 Million Units	3.2 Million Units
2020–21	0.8 Million Units	0.6 Million Units	1.0 Million Units	0.4 Million Units	2.9 Million Units

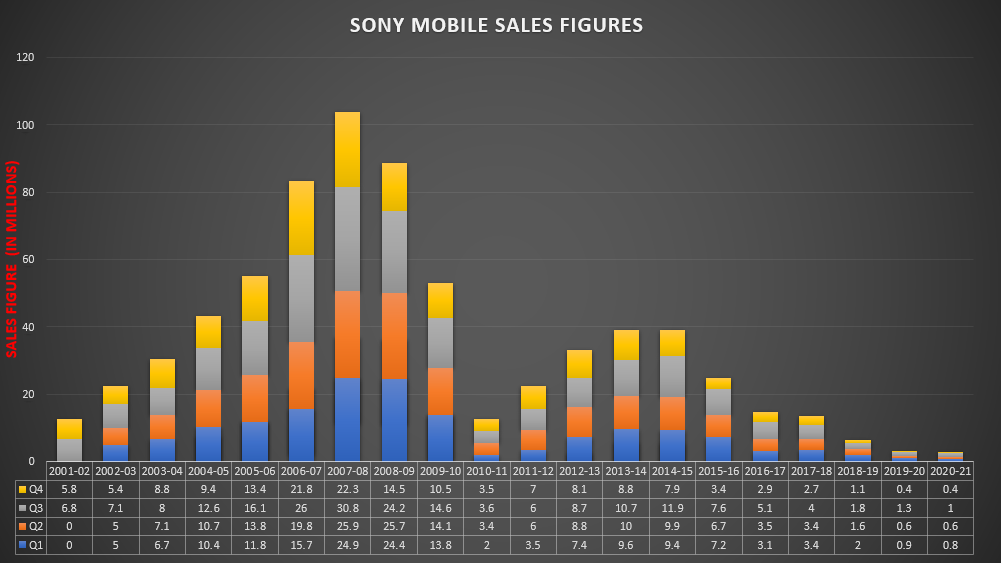
The Sony Mobile sales figure from 2001 to 2021

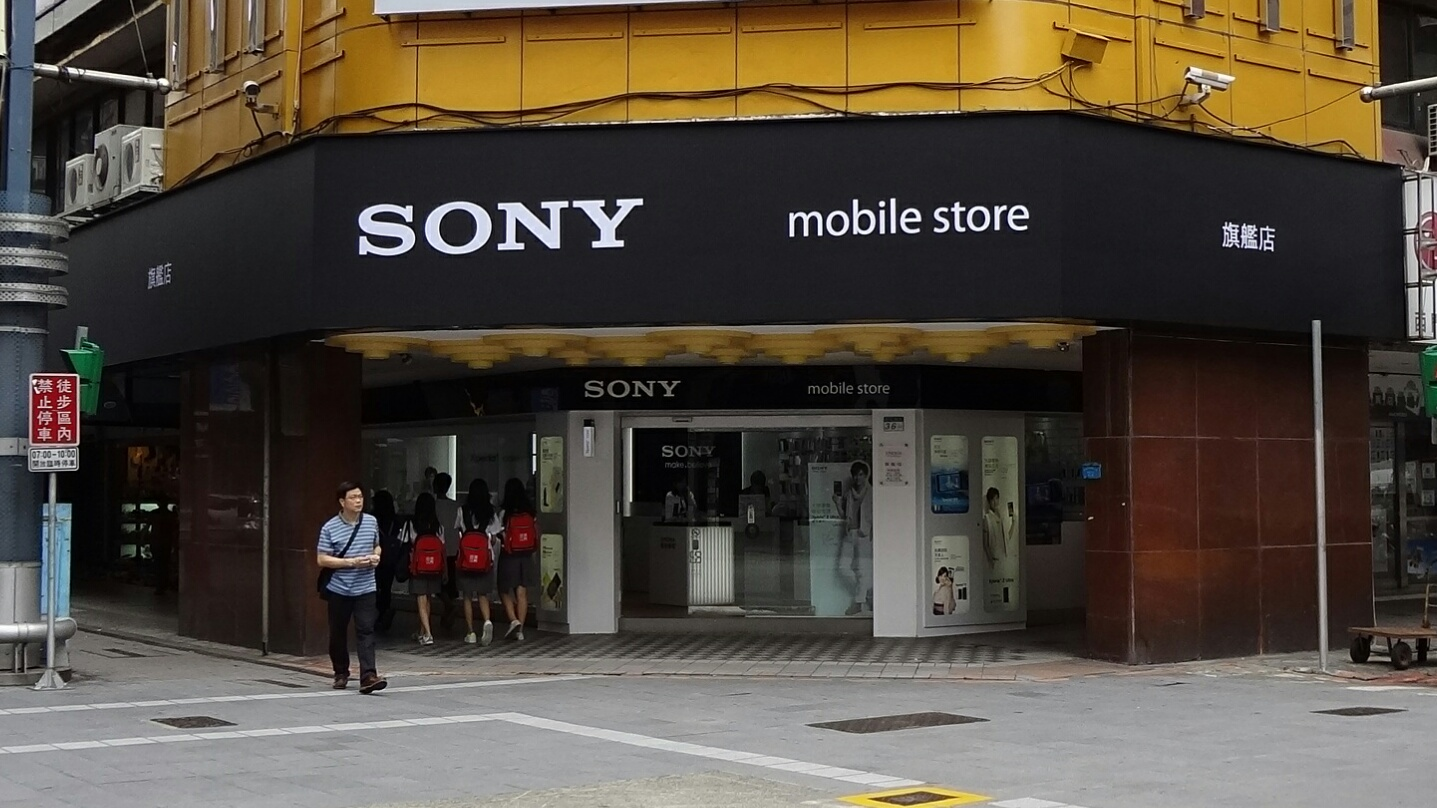
Sony Mobile store in Taipei, Taiwan in 2013

== Marketing campaigns ==
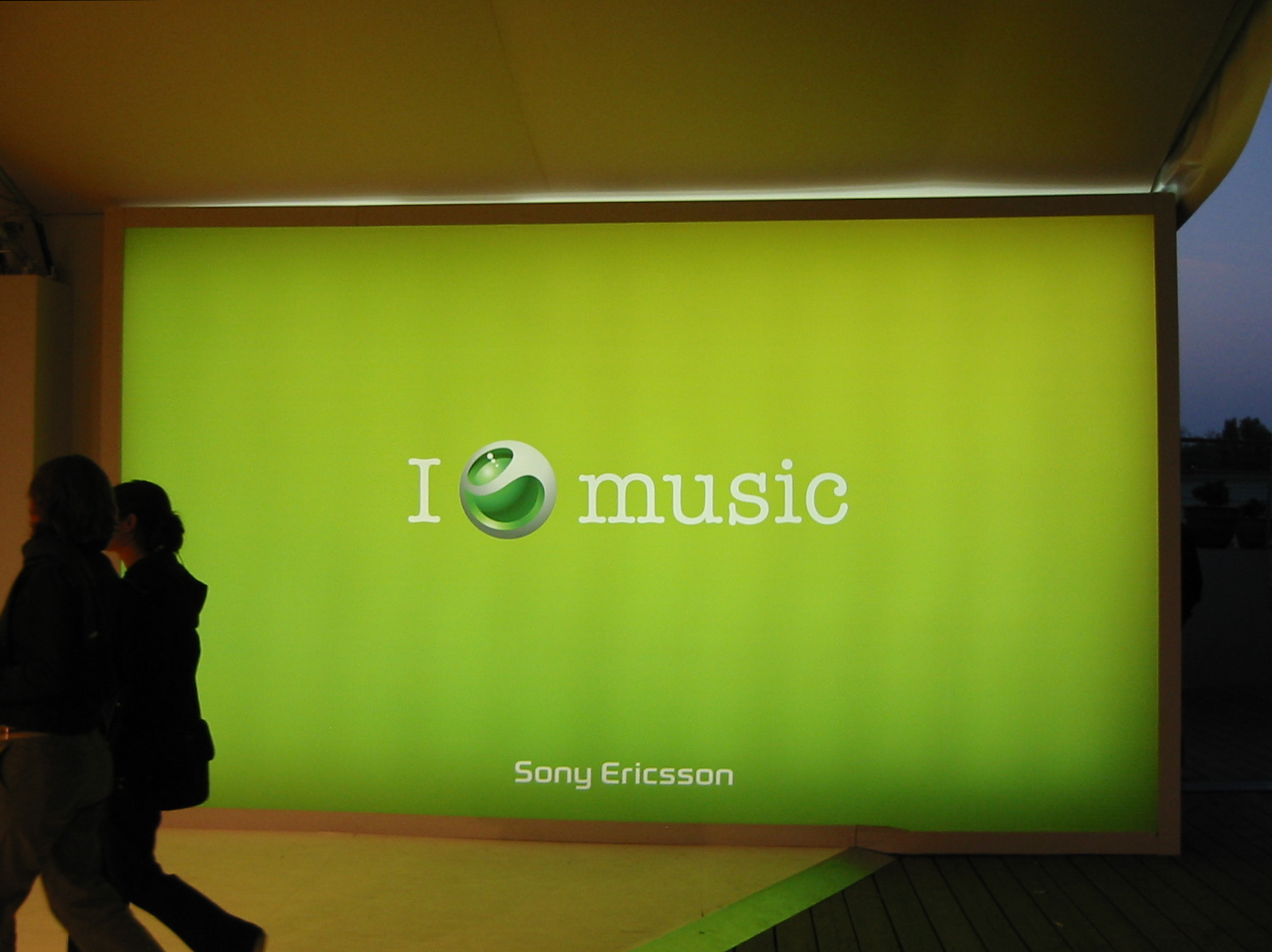
"I Love Music" ad banner in Madrid in 2006

=== "I love" ===
On October 2, 2006, Sony Ericsson adopted a new corporate and advertising identity inspired by I Love New York in which the circular Sony Ericsson icon is placed instead of a heart meaning "love". This would then be followed by words, initially simple ones such as "music" or "photography" and later by for instance "my hip hop loud" or "life captured". The branding was designed by the Wolff Olins consultancy. The campaign lasted until 2009 when it was replaced by multicoloured Sony Ericsson icons using Sony's slogan "make.believe".

=== Social media ===
During 2010, in 11 months, Sony Ericsson's Facebook fan count rose from 300,000 to 4 million to become the 40th-largest brand on the social networking site. The company aims to capitalise on this fanbase and increase engagement by profiling these fans and matching them to dedicated content. It will also analyse the top commenters on the Facebook page and ensure engagement through special content and offering these fans the chance to visit Sony Ericsson offices.

=== Sports sponsorship ===
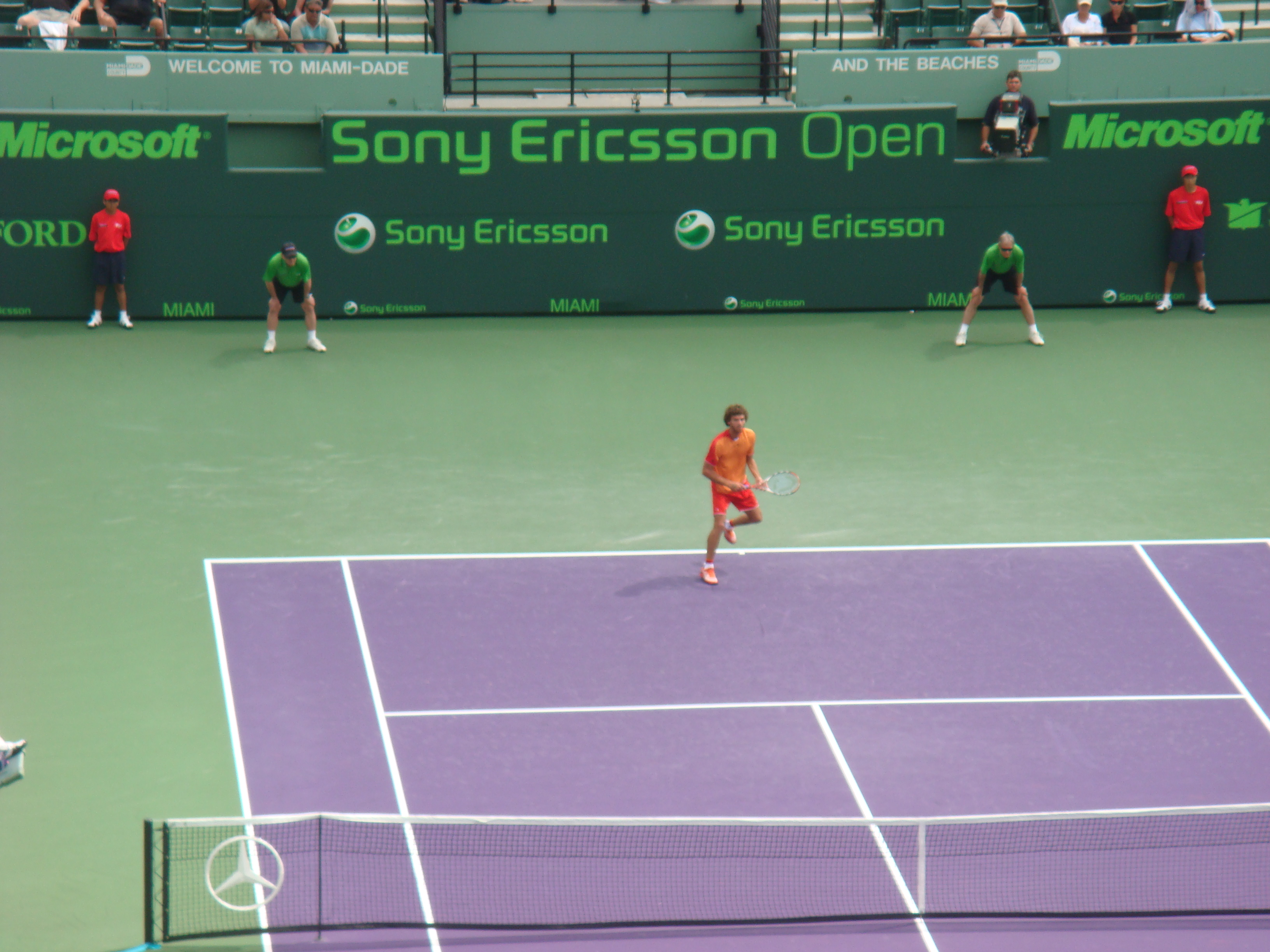
A Sony Ericsson Open tennis match in 2008

From 2007 to 2014, Sony Ericsson / Sony Mobile sponsored the Sony Ericsson Open tennis tournament in Miami. Stephan Croix, head of marketing executive for the company, stated that the sponsorship was used for displaying their mobile devices to fans. The tournament was originally called the Sony Ericsson Open which was renamed to Sony Open Tennis in 2013.

Sony Mobile sponsored the 2014 FIFA World Cup in Brazil and was a former partner of the UEFA Champions League.

== See also ==
- Media Go – music, photo, video, and game management software made for Sony Ericsson phones
- SonicStage – music management software made for Japan market phones
- PlayNow – global content distribution portal
- FastPort – proprietary former Sony Ericsson data bus
- List of Sony products
