= W800 =

W800, W 800 or W–800 may refer to:

- Sony Ericsson W800, a mobile phone
- Kawasaki W800, a motorbike
