= Miles Flint =

British businessman (born 1953)

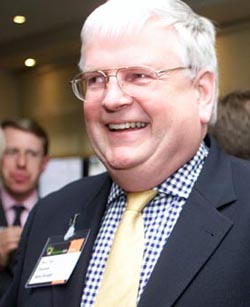
- Miles Flint
- Born: July 1953 (age 72)
- Occupation: businessman

Miles Flint (born in July 1953) is currently a senior advisor at private equity firm Silver Lake Partners. He is largely known as being the former President of Sony Ericsson Mobile Communications AB from June 2004 to November 2007. Before this role, he was the President of European Marketing at Sony Europe. He was responsible for the marketing activities of Sony's electronics business in Europe. Miles was also the Managing Director of Sony United Kingdom Limited. It was the holding company that includes all of Sony’s electronics operations in the British Isles.

Sony Ericsson Mobile Communications announced on 4 September 2007 that Miles Flint has decided to step down from his position as President of Sony Ericsson. Effective 1 November 2007, Hideki ‘Dick’ Komiyama succeeded Flint, who will remained as an Executive Advisor to Komiyama until the end of December 2007. Dick Komiyama will be based at Sony Ericsson’s offices in London.

== Career ==
Miles Flint first worked for Sony in January 1991 as managing director of Sony Broadcast & Communications UK. After a couple of years, Flint was promoted to president of Sony Broadcast & Professional Europe in January 1998.

Miles Flint and his team were in charge of the marketing and support of products and services to Sony’s Professional Solutions and Customers business division in Europe, Africa and the Middle East. After three years, he was given a position to the board of Sony Europe and then became the managing director of Sony UK Limited.

Flint was promoted to president of Sony Business Europe in July 2002. He also took charge of two more Sony businesses: Recording Media & Energy and Semiconductor & Electronic Solutions. In November 2003, he was given the position of President of European Marketing at Sony Europe.

Before the long career stint at Sony, Flint held various marketing and product development positions in the IT and telecommunications sector, first at ICL and then at STC after the acquisition of ICL.

Miles Flint announced on 4 September 2007 that he would step down as president of Sony Ericsson to pursue new personal and business opportunities. His departure was expected for 1 November 2007.

He will be the new chairman of the Skype.

=== Board and advisory roles ===
Flint has roles at several organizations:

- Member, Supervisory Group, AIESEC
- Chairman, Skype Group Sarl
- Non‑Executive Director, Sharpcards Ltd
- Chairman of Supervisory Board, Global Collect Bidco BV

== Education ==
Miles Flint graduated from the University of London and has an MBA from Cranfield University, UK. He also studied at Nanjing University, China.

== Personal ==
Miles lives in London (UK) with his wife and two children. He enjoys photography and sailing.
