= Sony Ericsson T610 =

Mobile phone model released in 2003

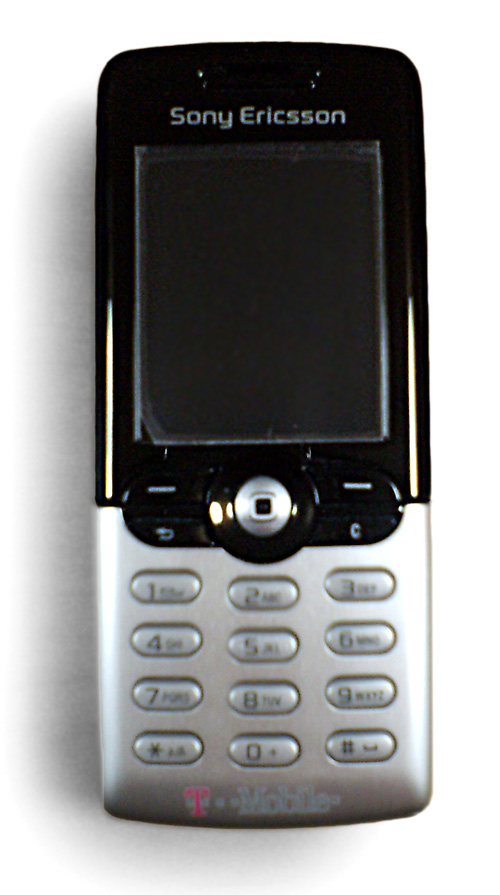
- Availability by region: 2003
- Predecessor: Ericsson T68
- Successor: Sony Ericsson T630; Sony Ericsson K700
- Compatible networks: GSM 900, GSM 1800, GSM 1900
- Dimensions: 102 mm × 44 mm × 19 mm (4.02 in × 1.73 in × 0.75 in)
- Weight: 95 g (3.4 oz)
- Rear camera: 288 × 352 (0.1 MP)
- Display: 128 × 160 pixels, CSTN
- Connectivity: GPRS, HSCSD, Bluetooth, IRDA
- SAR: 0.89 W/kg

The Sony Ericsson T610 is a mobile phone by Sony Ericsson, announced in March 2003. It was one of the first widely available mobile phones to include a built-in digital camera, Bluetooth, and a color screen, and features a joystick navigation. A much touted feature was QuickShare, the ability to easily share pictures taken with its camera. The Sony Ericsson T610's design was inspired by mid-century Scandinavian style and was considered appealing and sleek. The T610 became a very high selling model and is cited to have been Sony Ericsson's breakthrough product. The T630 was a later variant.

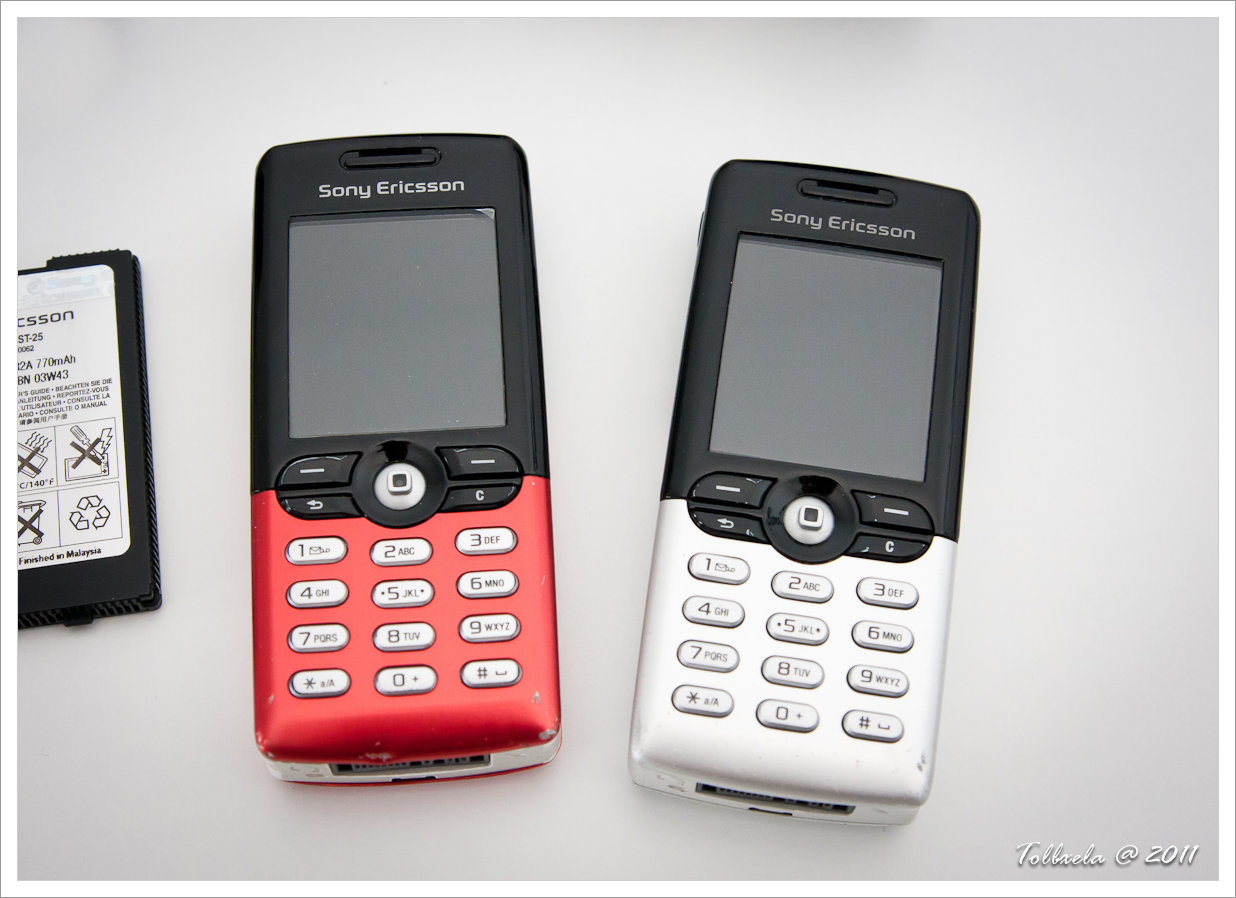
T610 in Volcanic Red and Aluminium Haze

The retro-style design of the phone was created by Swedish industrial designer Erik Ahlgren, and garnered appreciation in magazines, at expositions, and among buyers. The subtle curves of the body were divided vertically with thin metal or aluminum halves, which were colored. Its exterior is shiny black. The Sony Ericsson T610 was awarded 'Best Mobile Handset' at the 2004 3GSM congress.

The T610 was available in three distinct colors: Aluminium Haze, Abyss Blue, and Volcanic Red. The keypad remained silver regardless of body color variation. Many customers of Sony Ericsson in the United Kingdom complained to providers about being unable to obtain the phone in any color other than Aluminium Haze, and to date it is still the most widely sold variant of the phone.

== Features ==
Sony Ericsson T610 Internet icon

The T610 is a cameraphone that can take pictures in a resolution up to 288 × 352 pixels(CIF). It includes 2.5G technologies, supporting GPRS (Class 8) and HSCSD connections with Wireless Application Protocol (WAP) 2.0 capability. It supports polyphonic ringtones in MIDI, and mobile games in Java ME and Mophun formats, and comes with three games. It does not have built-in handsfree or speakerphone capabilities, however.

Specifications:

- 770 mAh Li-Pol battery and travel charger
- Triband (supports GSM 900/1800/1900 MHz bands)
- Bluetooth wireless technology
- Infrared port with the infrared eye on the top of the phone, next to the power button
- Optional: USB cable (USB Cable DCU-11 or USB Cable DCU-10)
- Built-in GPRS modem
- WAP 2.0/XHTML browser; the Internet icon appears when the phone is connected to the Web, using WAP or the built-in GPRS modem
- E-mail
- Polyphonic ringing tones
- Vibrating alert
- Dimensions: 102 × 44 × 19 mm
- 128×160 display, 16-bit color (65536 colors)
- PC synchronization SyncML
- Digital camera, image size: 288 × 352 pixels (CIF) or 120 × 160 pixels (QQVGA), 24-bit color depth (16 million colors), storage format JPEG
- Picture formats supported: JPEG, GIF, MBM, PNG and WBMP.
- Specific absorption rate (SAR) = 0.89 W/kg

== Firmware ==
The latest firmware version for the T610 is R7A011.

== Variants ==
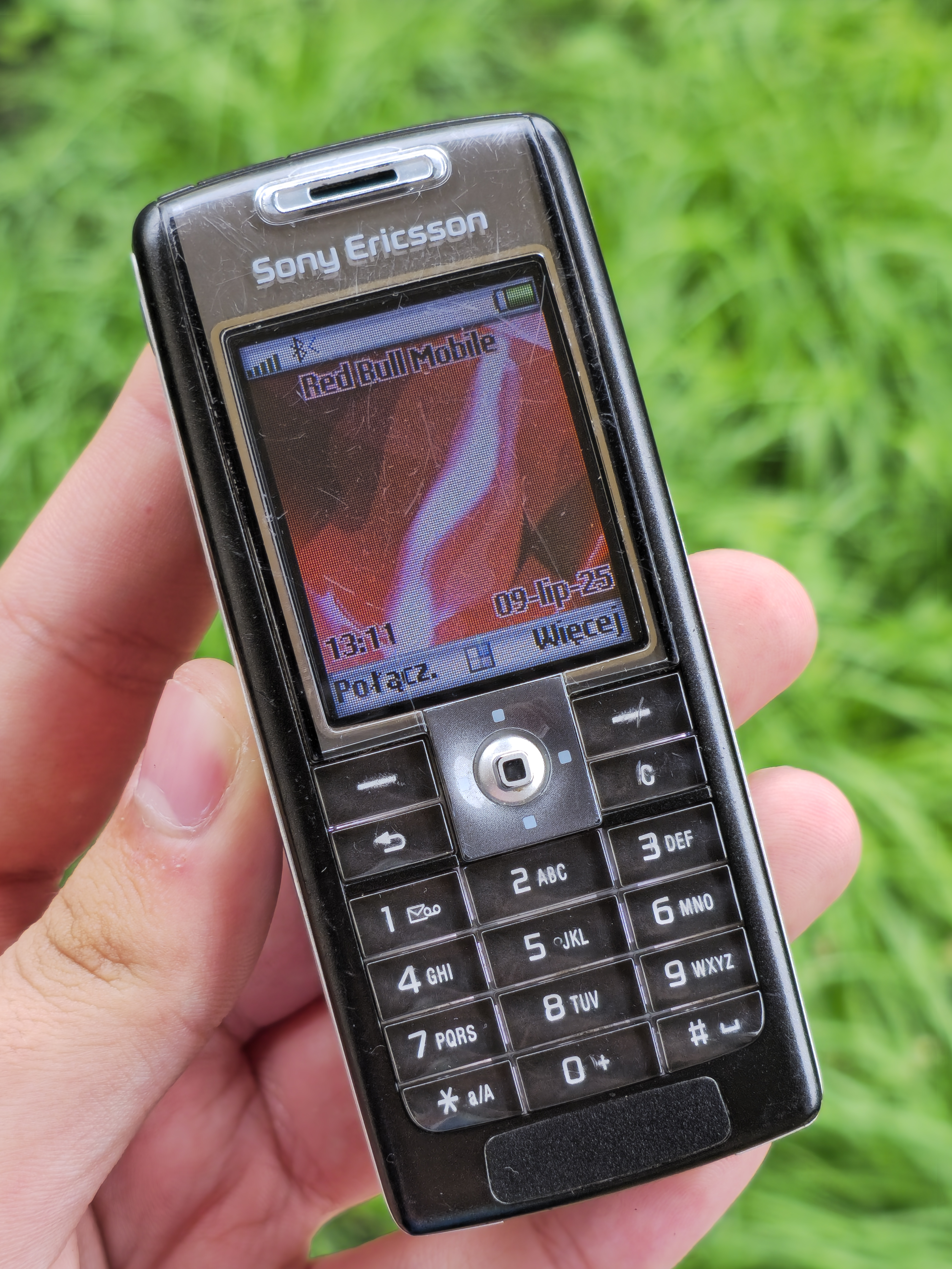
Sony Ericsson T630

- T616 - GSM 850/1800/1900 version for North America
- T628/T630 - New version of the T610 with TFT display, along with new keypad and case, available in Frosty Silver (white/silver) and in certain markets, Liquid Black (black/grey). It can automatically enlarge pictures to VGA size (480×640). The T630 was released in 2004.
- T637 - Same as T630, but with North American bands (GSM 850/1800/1900).
