= Sony Ericsson T68 =

Cell phone model

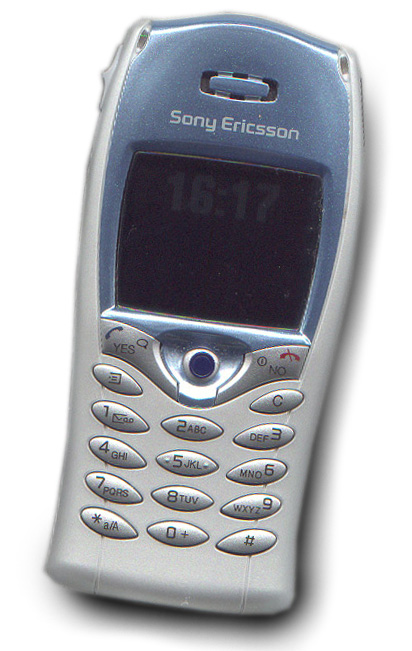
A T68i

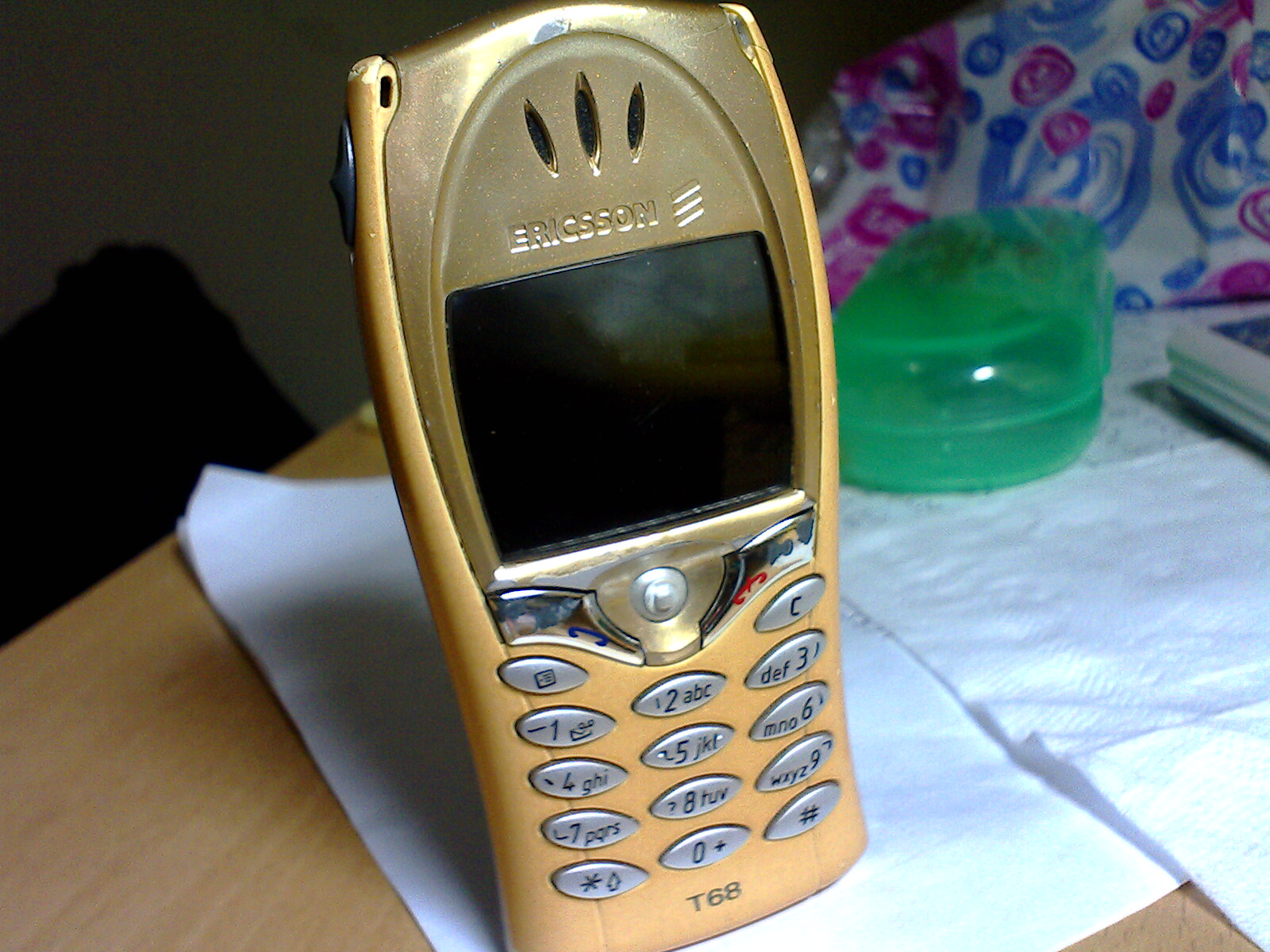
A T68m

The Ericsson T68m (often called simply T68) is a candy-bar style mobile phone by Ericsson Mobile Communications. Launched in time for the 2001 Christmas season, the T68 was the first Ericsson mobile phone to have a colour screen, a passive LCD-STN with a resolution of 101×80 and 256 colours. Despite its diminute size (3.94×1.89×0.79 in or 100×48×20 mm, 2.96 oz or 84 g), it was one of the most feature-rich mobile phones at the time, with Bluetooth, IrDA port, GPRS 3+1, tri-band compatibility (900 MHz, 1800 MHz and 1900 MHz), SMS with T9 (predictive text), EMS, WAP, and customizable monophonic ring tones. At its release, the phone cost around € 500, £299 in the UK, in either two-tone grey or all-gold.

== Features ==
A simple bitmap image editor was provided, allowing the creation of monochrome pictures by guiding a cursor around the canvas and setting or unsetting individual pixels (several 'brush' sizes were selectable to make this easier). These images could be set as the phone's background image in standby mode, and sent to owners of EMS-compliant phones. With EMS soon to be succeeded by the superior MMS, few owners made much use of this feature.

A camera was not present, which was sold as an add-on (MCA-25 CommuniCam) and, at the end of the model life cycle, was offered with the phone. Calendar items, wallpapers, screen savers, contact pictures and ringtones can be sent to the T68i through the Bluetooth protocol, or infrared.

The T68i was the first Ericsson (Sony) free from brominated flame retardants (BFR).

== Sony Ericsson T68i ==
In 2002, after a slight cosmetic redesign and a software upgrade, the T68m was re-released as the Sony Ericsson T68i, as by then Ericsson had created a joint venture with Sony Corporation to produce mobile phones as Sony Ericsson Mobile Communications. The upgrade, also available to owners of the T68, provided a built-in e-mail client, SyncML support, and, for the first time ever, two-way MMS with full SMIL implementation. The underlying hardware remained unchanged. The T68i is known for being a highly effective example of stealth marketing: Before being released Sony Ericsson paid actors to pretend to be tourists and asked people to take pictures of them with the T68i. The previously included Tetris game was not present in the firmware of the T68i.

While the T68i is sometimes cited as the first ever "Sony Ericsson" branded handset, this feat actually belongs to the Sony Ericsson C1002S, a phone produced by Sony alone and released on the au/KDDI carrier in Japan in December 2001.

== Variants ==
- T68m
- T68i
- T68ie
- T68a

== In popular culture ==
It was featured in the James Bond film Die Another Day.
