= Sony Ericsson K750 =

2005 mobile phone

Sony Ericsson K750i

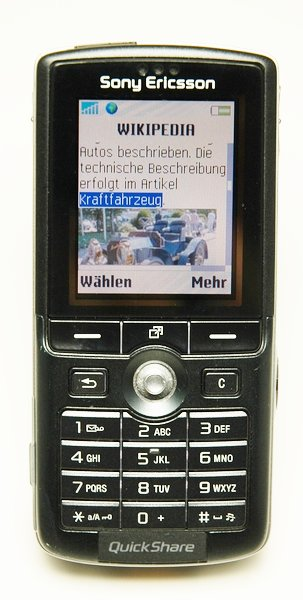
- First released: spring 2005
- Predecessor: K700
- Successor: K800i
- Related: W800
- Compatible networks: GSM 900/1800/1900
- Form factor: Candybar
- Dimensions: 100 mm × 46 mm × 20.5 mm (3.94 in × 1.81 in × 0.81 in)
- Weight: 99 g (3.5 oz)
- Memory: 34 MB Internal, 1 Memory Stick Pro Duo slot, 64 MB Memory Stick Pro Duo included and up to 2 GB
- Battery: BST-37; Li-Po 900 mAh
- Rear camera: 2 megapixel, resolutions 1632 ×1224, autofocus, led flash
- Display: 176×220 pixels (QCIF+), 262,144 (18-bit) Color TFT LCD
- Sound: Polyphonic Sound 40 voices, Real tone (MP3/AAC)
- Connectivity: GPRS, Bluetooth, IrDA, USB
- Codename: Clara

The Sony Ericsson K750, introduced in June 2005, is a high-end mobile phone, the successor to the now discontinued K700, and which was succeeded by the K800i in Q2 2006.

Before official release, K750 was known by its codename Clara.

There also was a T-Mobile exclusive version called D750i. Its hardware was similar to the K750i had T-Mobile branding with a light blue/white body and looked very similar to the Sony Ericsson W800.

== Design ==
The K750i is a candybar style phone that weighs 99 grams (3.5 ounces), with its buttons that can be used with any finger. It has the 'dual-front' design common to most Sony Ericsson mobile phones since the T610, with the back of the mobile phone designed like a digital camera and intended to be held sideways to take photographs. The K750i is available in four colours, Blue, Oxidized Black, metallic red and Blasted Silver (the latter of which is exclusive to Vodafone in the United Kingdom) with a red version later released. The central joystick button is used for selecting options and navigating menus, with the "C" button as an 'undo' or 'delete' button, and the arrow-labelled button as a 'return' or 'back' button. The two buttons labelled by white horizontal lines, known as 'hotkeys' or 'soft keys' perform the function of making binary decisions, labelled on the phone's display. The button in between of these 'soft keys' acts as a shortcut key, which brings up a user-customisable shortcut menu when pressed. The on/off button is located on the top of the phone next to the IrDA port.

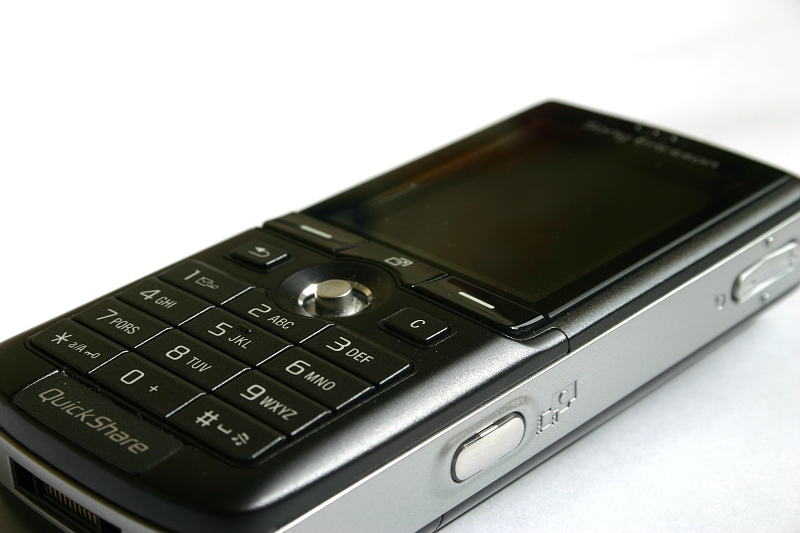
Right side showing the camera button and volume up/down button

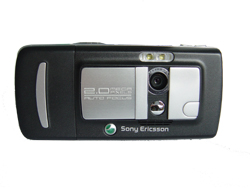
2 megapixel camera

There is one side key on the left of the phone; when pressed in standby mode, it opens either the RDS FM radio or the Media Player as selected by the user, allowing playback of WAV/MP3/AAC audio files, and 3GP/MPEG-4 video files. A press of this button in media player mode plays or pauses the selected media.
The RDS FM radio has 20 user-configurable presets.
The phone also features Sony's Mega Bass technology.

The left-hand side of the phone also houses the Memory Stick PRO Duo slot for external solid state memory, which is protected by a flexible rubber cover.

On the right-hand side of the phone there are three keys - two for controlling volume, skipping through tracks in the Media Player and zooming in and out when in camera mode. If the button is pressed when the headset isn't attached the phone displays a phone status screen showing profile, memory usage, battery level, and, on some mobile networks, phone number. The included handsfree headset is also required to listen to the radio since it functions as the antenna.

== Specification ==
Screen

- 176x220 pixels
- 262,144 colour TFT-LCD

Memory

- 64 MB Sony Memory Stick PRO Duo included
- Phone memory 38 MB (Actual free memory may vary due to phone pre-configuration)
- Memory Stick PRO Duo support (up to 2 GB)

Networks

- GSM 900
- GSM 1800
- GSM 1900

Available colors

- Black
- Silver

Sizes

- 100 x 46 x 20.5 mm (3.9 x 1.8 x 0.8 inches)

Weight

- 99 g
- 3.5 oz

Battery

- Sony Standard Battery BST-37

Camera

- 2 Megapixels
- AF 4.8 mm 1:2.8

== MP3 & connectivity ==
The phone has good all-round support for many versions of the MP3 file format, however support for WAV encoded files is not as extensive.

AAC support is good, and the phone can only properly handle LC AAC. HE-AAC (a.k.a. AAC+, a.k.a. eAAC) will play since HE-AAC is designed to be backwards compatible, however the SBR component will be ignored. The same is true with HE-AAC v2 (a.k.a. eAAC+), only the normal LC component of the file will be played. The SBR and parametric stereo (introduced with HE-AAC v2) is ignored. Since HE-AAC v2 encodes the sound as a mono-aural track and the stereo separation is recreated through the PS data, HE-AAC v2 files played on a K750 actually play back in mono.

The phone can also be used as a modem via Bluetooth, Infrared or USB. According to the Sony Ericsson website, the K750 has a talk time battery life of nine hours and a standby time battery life of 600 hours.

== Modding ==
Since K750i and W800i have essentially the same hardware specifications, soft modifications are available to convert a K750i to a W800i by using flashing software and W800i firmware.

A flashed K750i can also use the flight mode option, allowing the phone to work only as a media player while other functions are restricted. The Activity Menu will not be present when in flight mode - instead the Walkman player appears when it is pressed.

== List of firmware release (earliest to latest) ==
- R1A044
- R1C004 (Vodafone specific)
- R1J002
- R1L002
- R1N035
- R1AA008
- R1BA013
- R1BC002
- R1CA021
- R1DB001

Additionally the K750 shares its hardware with the lesser known D750, which has the interface of the K750, yet has a chassis similar to that of the W800.
