= Sony Ericsson W910i =

Mobile phone model

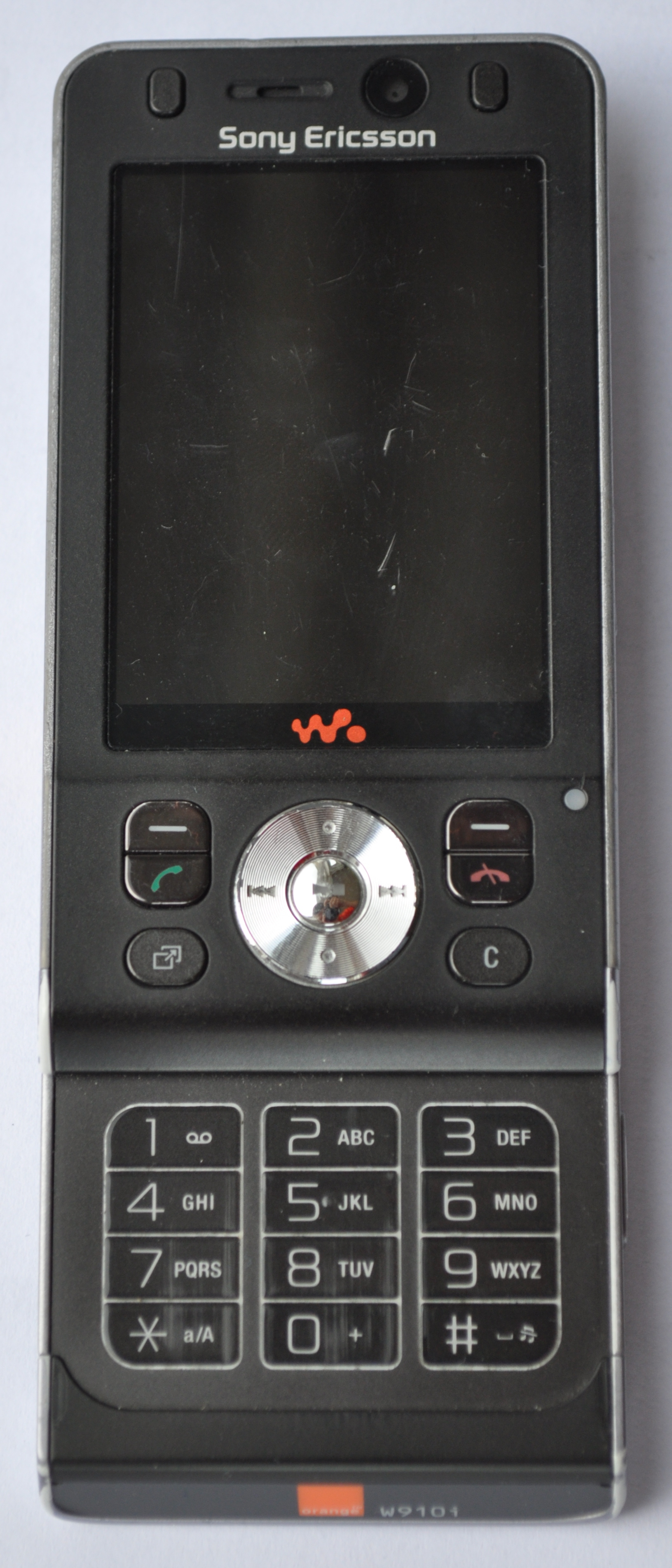
- Manufacturer: Sony Ericsson
- Availability by region: (United Kingdom) October 2007
- Predecessor: Sony Ericsson W900i
- Successor: Sony Ericsson W705
- Related: Sony Ericsson W580; Sony Ericsson W595; Sony Ericsson S810; Sony Ericsson S510; Sony Ericsson S500
- Compatible networks: -GSM (850/900/1800/1900) -GPRS -Quad band EDGE -UMTS 2100 -HSDPA 2100
- Form factor: Slider
- Dimensions: 3.9 x 2.0 x 0.5 in. 99 x 50 x 12 mm
- Weight: 3.0 oz 86 g
- Operating system: Sony Ericsson proprietary OS
- Memory: 40 MB internal
- Removable storage: Memory Stick Micro (M2) (up to 8 GB) supported
- Battery: 930 mAh Li-Ion battery
- Rear camera: 2.0 megapixel
- Front camera: Video calling camera
- Display: 2.4" 262,144 TFT LCD; 240x320 pixels
- Connectivity: -Bluetooth (2.0) -USB (2.0 proprietary)
- Data inputs: -Keypad -Accelerometer -Motion sensor -Ambient light sensor

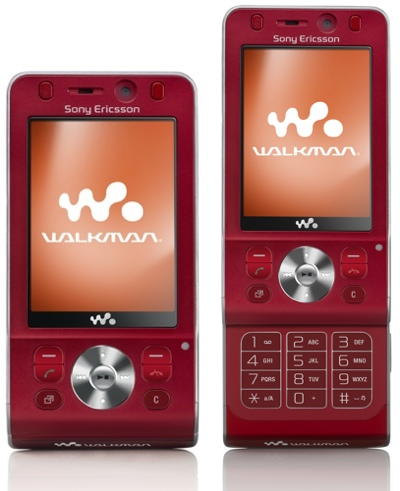
The red W910i, shown in collapsed and extended mode

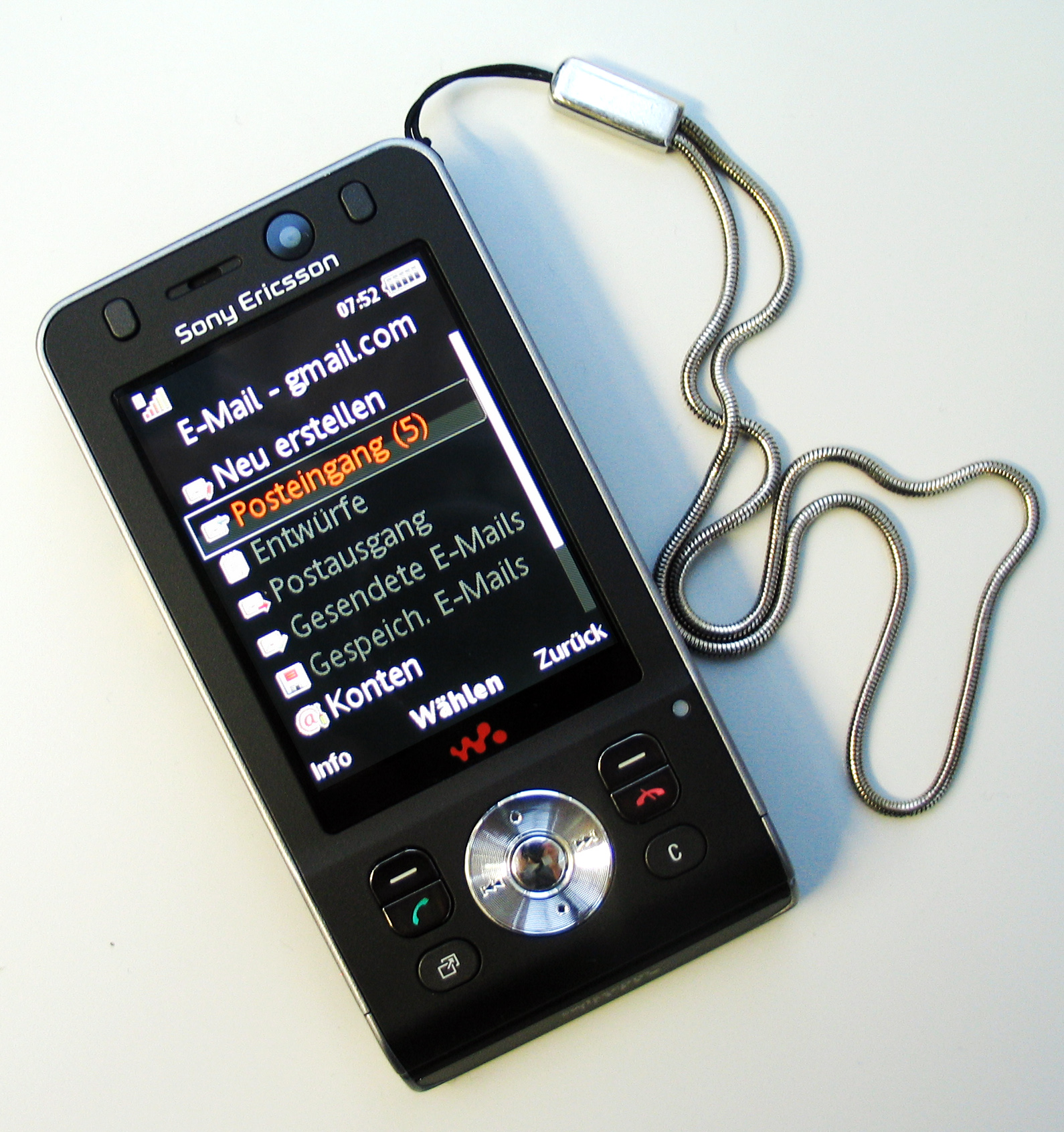
Closed W910i

The Sony Ericsson W910i is a slider model music phone. The W910i was announced on June 14, 2007, as a branded "Walkman phone" and uses version 3 of the 'Walkman Player'. The phone also features the shake control feature found on the W580 that enables music track switching by shaking the phone and also for Java ME based video games and applications using the JP-8.

The phone, alongside the K850 Cybershot and the more expensive W960 Walkman, was one of the first phones from the company to use the Sony Ericsson Media Manager which replaces the now-defunct File Manager seen on older models. The Walkman music software also uses the 'SensMe' feature which designates the mood depending on the genre and the speed of the track the user is playing. The phone has had its camera interface revamped and resembles the one seen on K850; however the BestPic feature has been replaced by Burst Mode.

The W910i is available in six different colors which have been advertised as "Hearty Red", "Noble Black", "Havana Bronze", "Prime Silver", "Lipstick Pink" and "Silky White". Included in certain retail configurations are a 1 GB or 2 GB capacity memory card. As well as the Walkman digital music player, the W910i can also play FM radio with features using RDS and GraceNote TrackID service.

On February 14, 2008, the W910 was given the GSM Association's "Best Handset 2008" award.

== Stability issues ==
The Sony Ericsson W910i was known to crash and switch itself off intermittently. As of November 2009, firmware had yet to be released to fully resolve these issues, though some users had reported that later firmware versions have dramatically reduced the frequency of these issues occurring.

The phone itself had received much criticism for its instability, which include complaints about screen and system freezing, restarting and button input failures. Many reviews and user forums consistently noted this as a major problem for the Sony Ericsson phone.

== Technical specifications ==
- Walkman 3.0 Player (MP3/AAC/WMA/WAV), SensMe
- Java MIDP 2.0 with OpenGL ES and Motion Sensor support
- Video player with progressive fast forward and slow motion
- New 3 softkey interface layout with Call/End keys (A200 Platform), a software feature of Java Platform 8

Advertised battery life

- 400hr standby time
- 9hr talk time

Rear camera

- 2-megapixel
- Maximum resolution (still image): 1600x1200 pixels
- 2.5x digital zoom
- Video recording format: .MP4 (AAC audio)
- Video recording resolution: 320x240@15fps
- No flash

Front camera

- Video calling resolution: 176x144 or 128x96

== Critical reception ==
CNET hardware reviewer Ella Morton wrote that there are some compatibility issues with Windows Media Player for the Walkman functions and criticized the shake and motion sensing function of the W910i but she concluded that "there is much to like beyond the quirky bits" giving it a rating of 8.2/10.

== See also ==
- Nokia N81
- Nokia 5610 XpressMusic
