= Sony Ericsson W850i =

Mobile phone model

Sony Ericsson W850
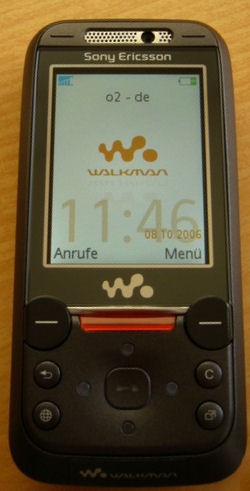
- First released: 2006
- Predecessor: Sony Ericsson W600
- Successor: Sony Ericsson W580i (W830c)
- Compatible networks: UMTS 2100 / GSM 900/1800/1900 (no 3G in the states)
- Dimensions: 98 mm × 47 mm × 21 mm (3.86 in × 1.85 in × 0.83 in)
- Weight: 116 g (4.1 oz)
- Operating system: Sony Ericsson proprietary OS
- Memory: 16 MB Internal
- Removable storage: Memory Stick PRO Duo
- Battery: Removable 950 mAh Li-Ion battery
- Rear camera: 2MP, LED flash
- Front camera: Yes
- Display: 240×320 pixels (~200 ppi), 262,144 (18-bit) Color TFT LCD
- Connectivity: GPRS, Bluetooth v2.0, IrDA, USB

The Sony Ericsson W850i is the first 3G slider mobile phone by Sony Ericsson, introduced in Q2 2006. It is a member of their Walkman line, succeeding the Sony Ericsson W600. The phone made its first public appearance in the 2006 movie The Da Vinci Code, months before its release. It is similar mechanically to the Sony Ericsson K800i, but differs in form factor, use of the Memory Stick PRO Duo instead of the Memory Stick Micro, and camera quality. (2.0 megapixels instead of 3.2 for the K800i, and with some additional features removed)

The model's features are identical to those of the W880i, apart from the form factor and the inclusion of an FM radio and Photolight on this model. There is a non-3G version of the W850i called the W830c.

The phone is configured for operator over-the-air (OTA) music download services, and accepts popular music file formats including MP3 and e-AAC+. It was supplied with a 1 GB Memory Stick PRO Duo. The Golden White version has a gold Walkman logo on the back which the black version does not include.

The Walkman player contains Gracenote Mobile TrackID, which enables a user to record a few seconds of a song, either via the microphone or the built-in FM radio, and attempts to identify the track.

== Hardware and software ==
The W850i has a TFT 240×320 display packed in a 116 gram slider body. It was released in two colours, black and white, and can show eight lines of text on its two-inch display. It has a fixed internal antenna. The phone supports 3G telephony, Bluetooth 2.0, infrared file sharing, and USB, but does not support WLAN networks, unlike later Walkman models.

The phone runs on Sony Ericsson's proprietary OS, equipped with various applications such as:

- Organizer menu where users can access calendar, reminders, notes, alarms, calculator, and timer/stopwatch
- Voice recorder, saving in the Adaptive Multi-Rate audio codec (.amr) format.
- Flashlight utilising the camera's flash.
- MusicDJ, allowing MIDI songs to be created.
- PhotoDJ and VideoDJ, allowing media to be edited.
- Four built-in games:
  - QuadraPop, a Tetris-style game
  - Rafting, where the player maneuvers a boat through obstacles
  - Juiced (video game)
  - Treasure Towers, a 2D platformer.

== See also ==
- Sony Ericsson
- List of Sony Ericsson products
- Walkman
