= Sony Ericsson K800i =

Cell phone model

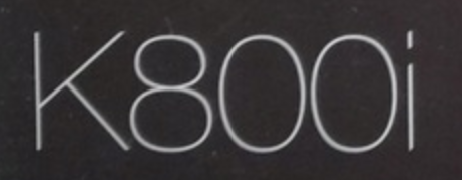

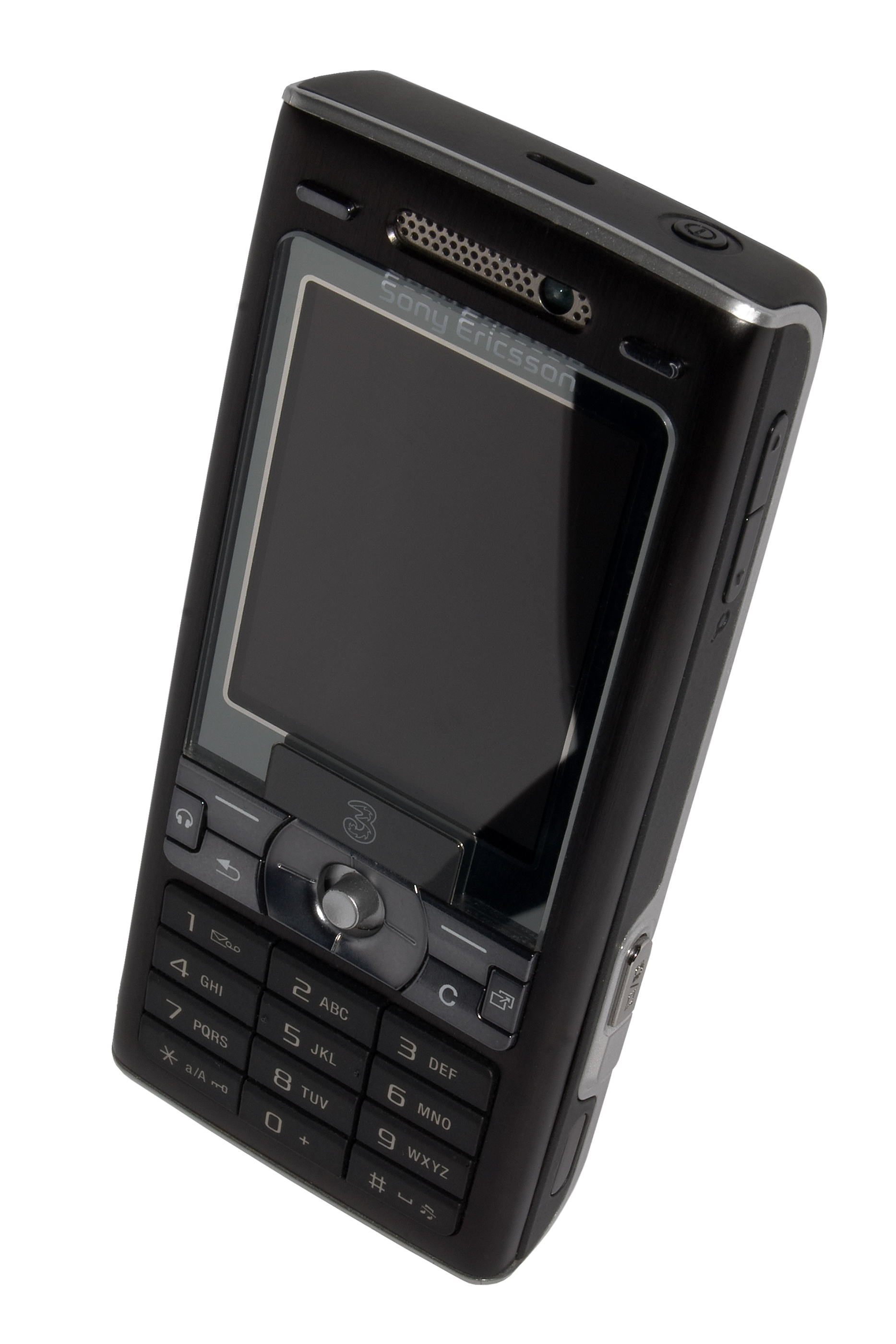
- Developer: Sony Ericsson
- Manufacturer: Sony Ericsson
- Type: Camera phone
- Series: K-series
- First released: February 2006; 20 years ago
- Predecessor: Sony Ericsson K750
- Successor: Sony Ericsson K810 (later iteration); Sony Ericsson K850
- Compatible networks: UMTS 2100, GSM 900, GSM 1800, GSM 1900
- Form factor: Candybar
- Dimensions: 106×47×20 mm (4.17×1.85×0.79 in)
- Weight: 115 g (4 oz)
- Operating system: Sony Ericsson A100 software platform
- System-on-chip: Ericsson DB2020
- Memory: 64 MB internal, Memory Stick Micro (M2) slot
- Storage: 64 MB
- SIM: miniSIM
- Battery: BST-33 Li-Ion, 1,230 mAh, up to 400 hrs,
- Charging: Fast Port (proprietary) [standard]
- Rear camera: 3.2 MP AF (QCIF, 176 x 144p at 15 FPS)
- Front camera: None
- Display: 2.0” QVGA (240x320 pixels), 262,144 (18-bit) Color TFT LCD
- Connectivity: CSD, HSCSD, GPRS, W-CDMA, Bluetooth 2.0 + EDR, IrDA, USB (with Mass Storage Mode support)

The Sony Ericsson K800i and Sony Ericsson K790 are mobile phone handsets manufactured by Sony Ericsson. Launched in July 2006 (for the K800i in the UK market; others may vary), the phones are the successor to the Sony Ericsson K750i, and are the first to be tagged with the Cyber-shot branding. Both of the phones feature a 3.2-megapixel digital camera complete with a xenon flash, a protective lens cover, and a new "BestPic" bracketing feature.

The new "BestPic" feature takes 9 full quality snapshots of a subject in quick succession, allowing the user to choose the best shots from them. On the entertainment front, the phones have a media player supporting MP3, AAC/AAC+/eAAC+ and WMA music files and 3GP/MPEG-4 video files. The phones also feature a RDS FM radio, and a Memory Stick Micro (M2) slot for expandable solid state memory (up to 16 GB). The K790/K800 models are also the first Sony Ericsson mobile phones to use ATI's Imageon 2192 graphics engine, which delivers a full 3D gaming graphics for Java and full support for its 3.2-megapixel camera. It is the phone used by James Bond in the 2006 Casino Royale film and trailers.

The difference between the two phones is that the K790 supports GSM and EDGE, while the K800 supports UMTS and GSM. As a result, the K800i features a QCIF (176X144) resolution front-mounted camera for 3G video conferencing. According to the official Sony Ericsson specifications (to be found on their website), the K800's talk time drops steeply from around 7 hours when using GSM to about 2 hours 30 minutes whilst using UMTS. A modified version of the K800i, the Sony Ericsson K810i, was released. Its successor is the 5-megapixel Sony Ericsson K850i.

== Design and features ==
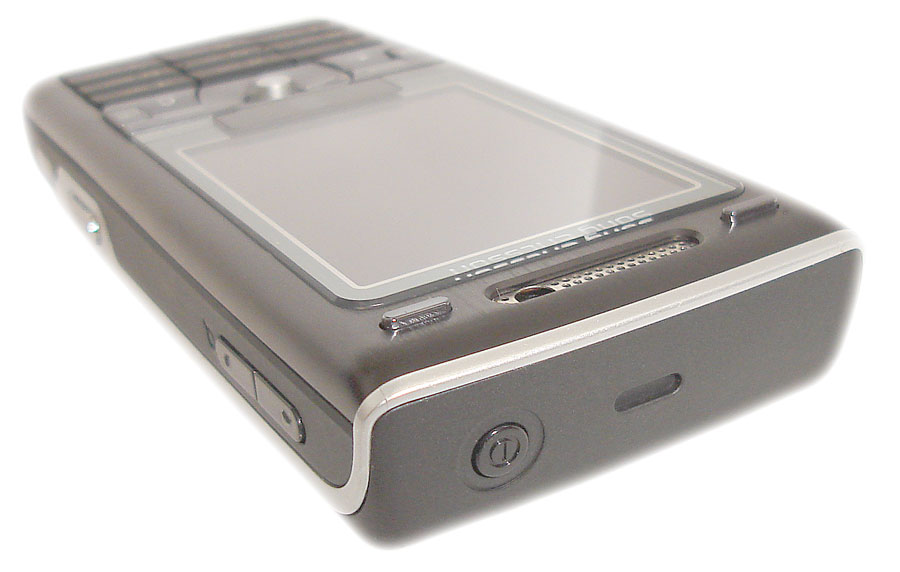
Top, front and right side

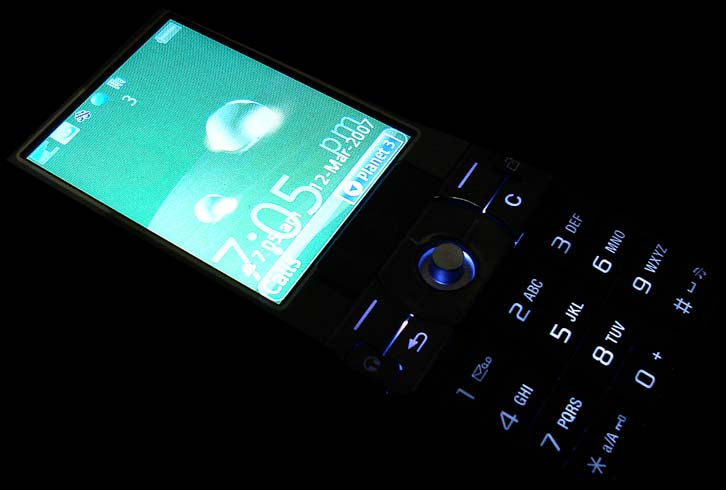
The phone in complete darkness

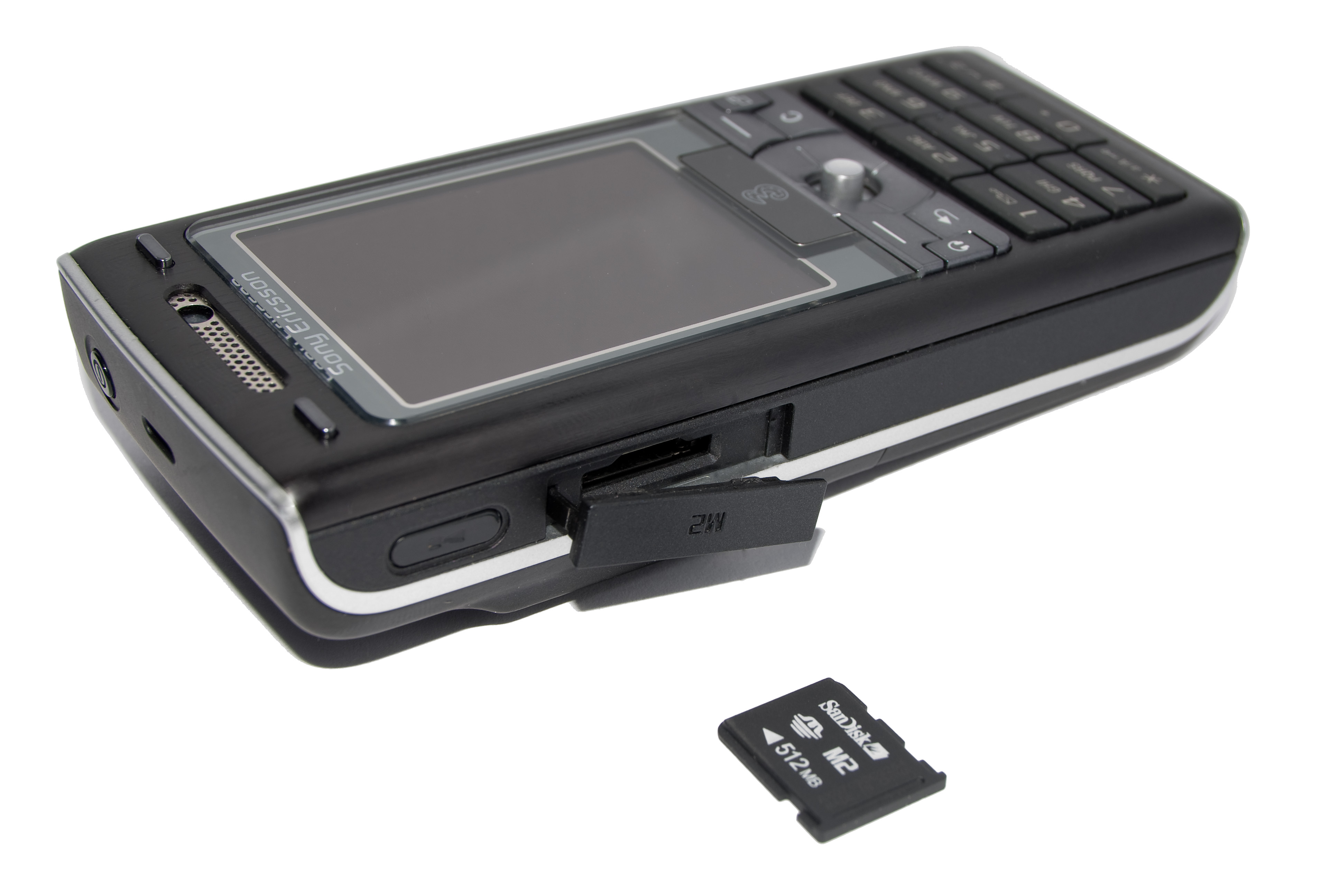
Memory Stick Micro M2 Slot on left side of device

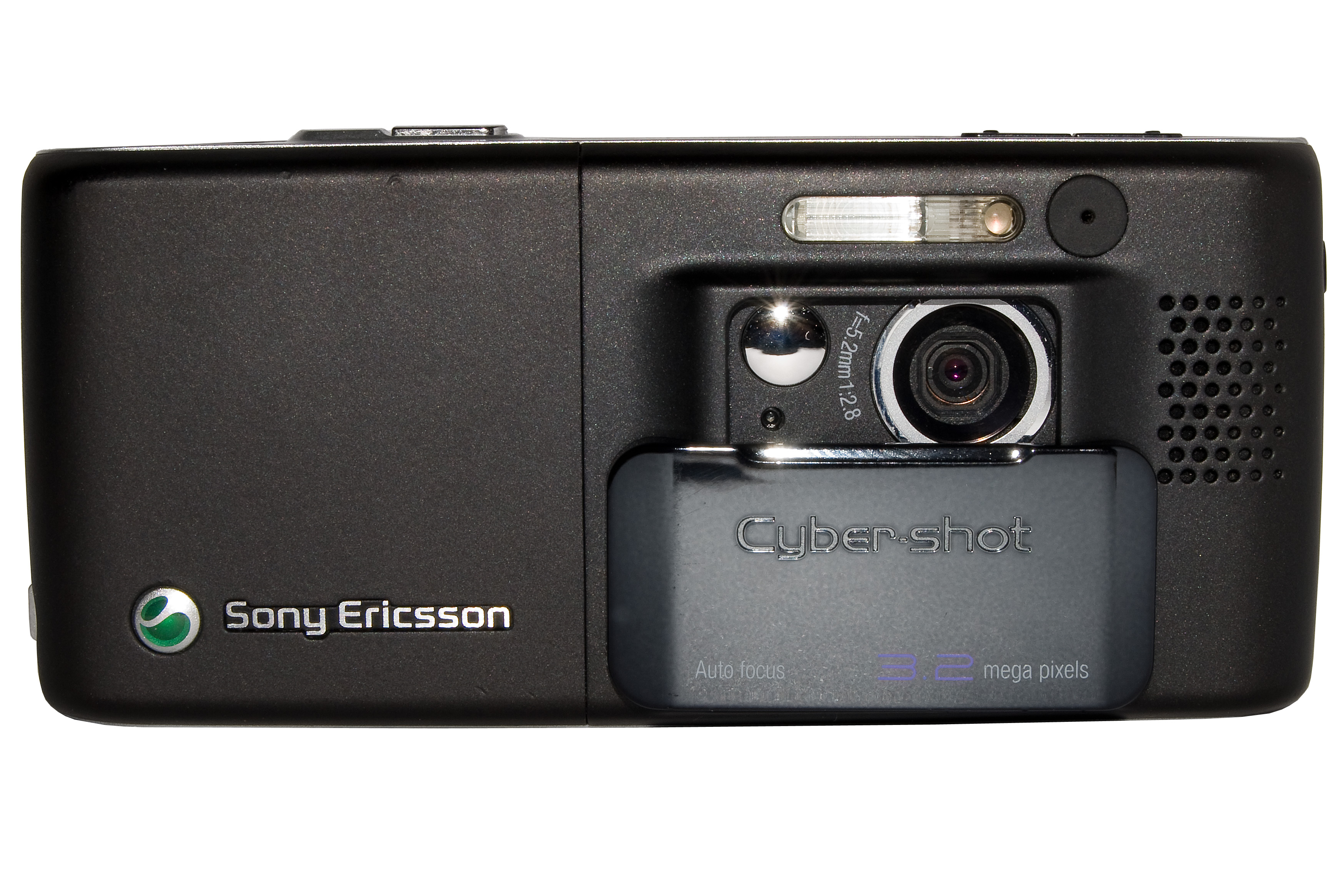
Back side

The K800i/K790 is a "block" (or "candy bar") style phone that weighs 115 grams, with its buttons operated by the thumb. It has the "dual-front" design common to most Sony Ericsson mobile phones since the Sony Ericsson K700, with the back of the mobile phone designed like a digital camera and intended to be held sideways to take photographs. The central joystick button is used for selecting options and navigating menus, with the "C" button as an undo or delete key, and the arrow-labelled button as a "back button".

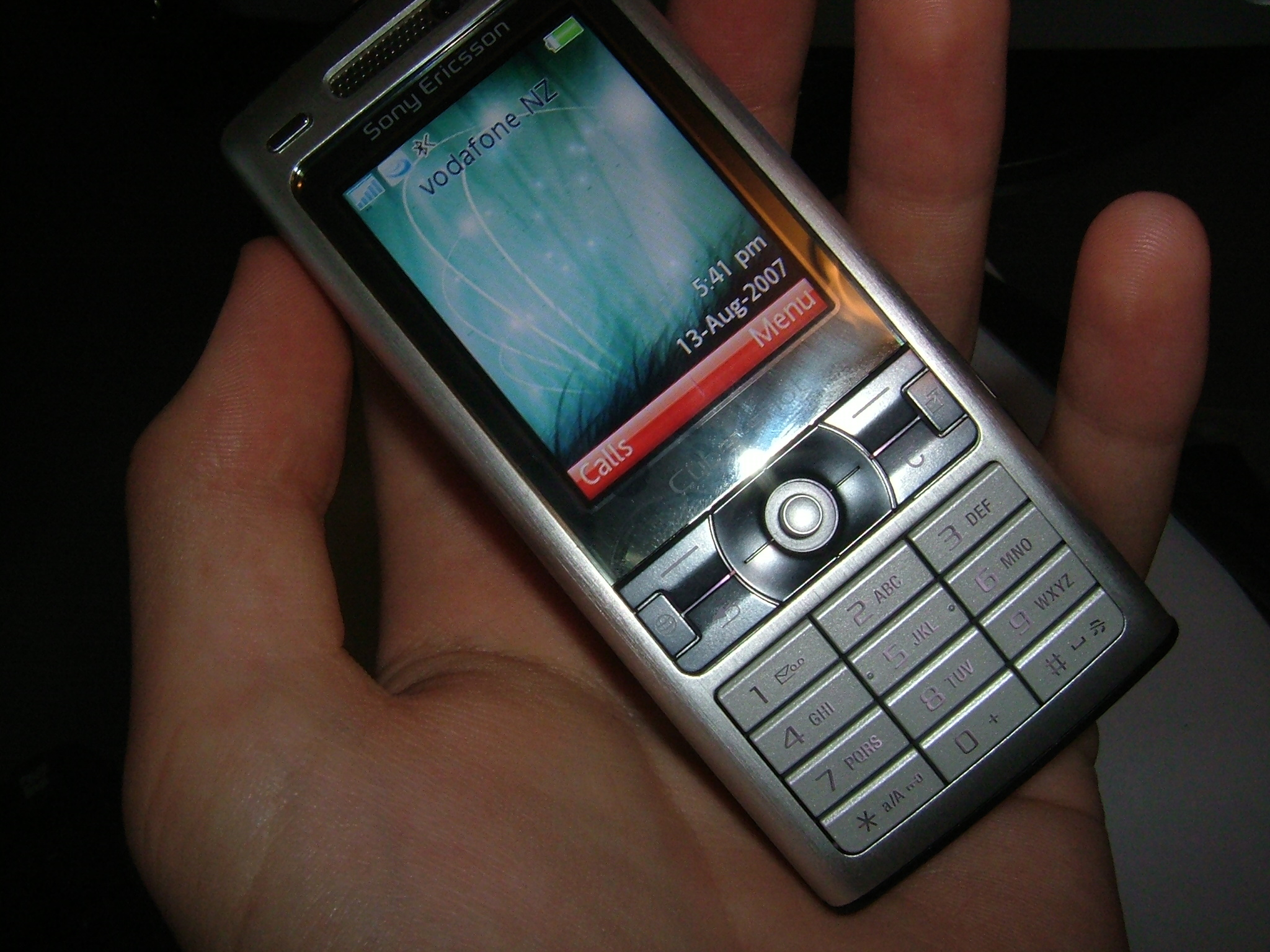
The Royale Silver version of the phone

The two buttons labelled by white horizontal lines, known as hotkeys or soft keys perform the function of making decisions with only two choices. Such decisions are labelled on the phone's display. The button in between the right soft key and the "C" button acts as a shortcut key, which brings up a user-customisable shortcut menu when pressed. The two "A/B" buttons on either side of the earpiece are used for horizontal games support, as in the Sony Ericsson W550/W600. The on/off button is located on the top of the phone. The Memory Stick Micro M2 slot is located on the left-hand side of the phone. On the right-hand side of the phone there are three keys: two for controlling volume, skipping through tracks in the Media Player, changing radio channel, and zooming in and out when in camera mode. The third button on the right is the camera shutter button which operates the phone's key feature, a 3.2-megapixel Cyber-shot digital camera. In amongst the speaker at the top of the phone is a small camera used for video calls. Located next to this is the IrDA port.

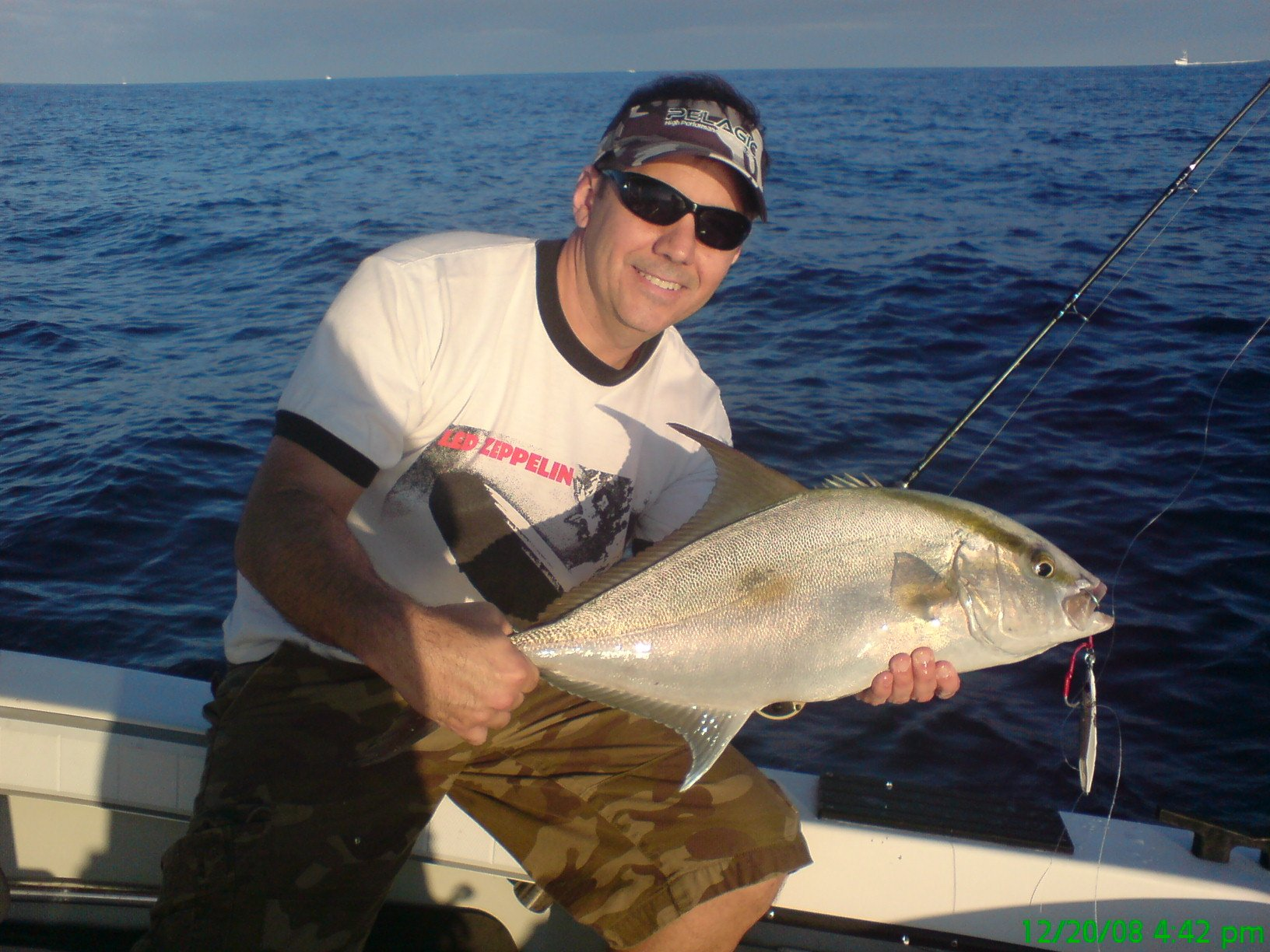
Photo taken with K790i

The phone has a standard minimum user-available internal memory capacity of 64 MB. The external memory capacity can be extended by using a Memory Stick Micro M2, intended to support both the camera and the media player function of the phone. The phone can be connected to a computer for data transfer and recharging. Communication is made using either the built-in Bluetooth wireless or the supplied USB data cable, which connects to the phone using Sony Ericsson's proprietary FastPort connector, which is located on the bottom of the phone. The phone can also be used as a Bluetooth or USB GPRS/3G modem.

K800i/K790 cellphones feature full support for USB mass storage recognition. This means that there will be no need for driver installation on modern operating systems such as Mac OS X, Windows XP and Linux, as the phone will be automatically recognized as an external storage device upon connection. Data retrieval also includes the ability to output files by infra-red and Bluetooth (as well as in network-transmitted messages) to other devices. Although typical of many recent Sony Ericsson devices, support for outputting files other than over the mobile network has been variable with other brands.

In the calendar, a new feature is supported for recurring event notifications on a yearly basis, which the predecessor K750 lacked. The calendar is closely compatible with Microsoft Outlook.

Mac OS X v10.4.9 added support for calendar and contact syncing under iSync 2.4.

== Variants ==
- K800i - International version: Dual-mode UMTS (2100 MHz) & GSM (900/1800/1900 MHz), with W-CDMA and GPRS - for all regions except mainland China
- K800c - Mainland China version: Dual-mode UMTS (2100 MHz) & GSM (900/1800/1900 MHz), with W-CDMA and GPRS
- K790i - International version: Tri-band GSM (900/1800/1900 MHz), with EDGE - for all regions except mainland China and North America
- K790c - Mainland China version: Tri-band GSM (900/1800/1900 MHz), with EDGE
- K790a - North American version: Tri-band GSM (850/1800/1900 MHz), with EDGE

== Technical specifications ==
=== Platform technology ===
Built on the U250 from Ericsson Mobile Platform.

=== Imaging ===
- 3.2 MP CMOS digital camera with auto-focus and Macro mode
- 32x digital zoom
- Xenon flash with mF illuminator assist
- Shutter button with auto-focus (press half-way to auto-focus, fully to capture)
- Red-eye reduction
- PictBridge & DPOF
- Image Stabilization
- BestPic - takes 9 successive images of the same subject in full resolution to choose the best shot(s)
- QCIF (176x144) resolution video recording at 15 frame/s in 3GP format

=== Network ===
- K800i / K800c
  - Dual-mode: UMTS at 2100 MHz, and GSM at 900 MHz, 1800 MHz and 1900 MHz
- K790i / K790c
  - Sony Ericsson: Rings of Light
    Tri-band GSM at 900 MHz, 1800 MHz and 1900 MHz
- K790a
  - Tri-band GSM at 850 MHz, 1800 MHz and 1900 MHz

=== Price ===
Since the release of its successor the market price has dramatically fallen and, as of November 2008, it was available on a UK pre-pay network between £69.99 to £89.99.

=== Entertainment ===
- Media Player with Equalizer and Stereo Widening
- MP3, WMA, RealAudio 8 and AAC/AAC+/eAAC+ audio (unlike the K750 and W800, the K800 implements the HE-AAC and HE-AAC 2 formats)
- MP4, 3GP and RealVideo 8 video
- RDS FM radio
- MusicDJ, PhotoDJ and VideoDJ
- Sound recorder (saves records in AMR format)
- Streaming audio/video
- 3D Java games
- A/B buttons for horizontal games support and full-screen image preview modes
- FaceWarp (pre-installed Java Application, not in all models)
- Remote Control application (confirmed on K790i), allows you to use your phone as a Human interface device (like mouse or keyboard) via Bluetooth. Three button presets available: Presenter, MediaPlayer, Desktop. Supported on host computer natively by Bluetooth stack (vendor-independent).

=== Internet ===
- Access NetFront - Full HTML browser
- Download Manager
- Native RSS Reader
- Email (POP3 and IMAP4). With Push e-mail available for IMAP4.

=== Connectivity ===
- Infrared port (IrDA)
- Bluetooth 2.0 + A2DP
- CSD
- HSCSD
- GPRS
- EDGE (K790 versions only)
- W-CDMA (K800 versions only)
- USB 2.0 Synchronization or Mass Storage Device Transfer Mode via Fast Port connector

=== Storage ===
- (M2) (Card not included as standard, up to 2 GB supported officially - unofficially up to 16 GB)
- Minimum 64 MB Internal Flash memory (can be expanded to almost 75 MB through removal of preinstalled applications

=== Dimensions ===
- 106 x 47 x 20 mm (22 mm at the thickest part, which is the digital camera lens cover)

=== Operating system ===
- Sony Ericsson Java Platform 7 (Java ME)

=== Display ===
- ATI Imageon 2192 8 MB Graphics Engine (including support for its 3.2-megapixel camera for High Color)
- 2.0-inch QVGA (240x320) TFT LCD
- 262,144 (18-bit) colors

=== Colours ===
- Velvet Black
- Allure Brown
- Royale Silver (James Bond Casino Royale Limited Edition)
- Concrete Silver

=== Specific absorption rate (SAR) ===
- 0.59 W/kg (right)

== Startup failures and data corruption ==
For some users, the K800i can suddenly and unexpectedly fail to startup, and instead just show a flashing white screen repeatedly. This problem happens due to internal data corruption (caused by the phone), and can only be fixed by restoring ("flashing") the phone to its original software/firmware — meaning that all personal data will be deleted. On some occasions, this problem can be fixed by using the Update Service software that comes on the CD (or from Sony Ericsson's website). However, personal data will still be erased.

Users are recommended to regularly backup their data using both a Memory Stick — for photos and contacts — and using the software MyPhoneExplorer to back up text messages, calendar appointments and other data to a PC.

A startup failure can be forecast by the following events:

- All the custom words added to the dictionary are suddenly deleted
- The phone duplicates some text messages in the Drafts folder
- Many text messages in the Inbox are suddenly deleted

Users should back up their data when any of these events happen.

== Media device problems ==
Sometimes dependent on age of phone/operating system the K800i doesn't show in PC media player software even when it is visible as mass storage. A work around is to uninstall the phone via device manager and wait for the phone to automatically reinstall.
