= Sony Ericsson W890i =

2008 mobile phone

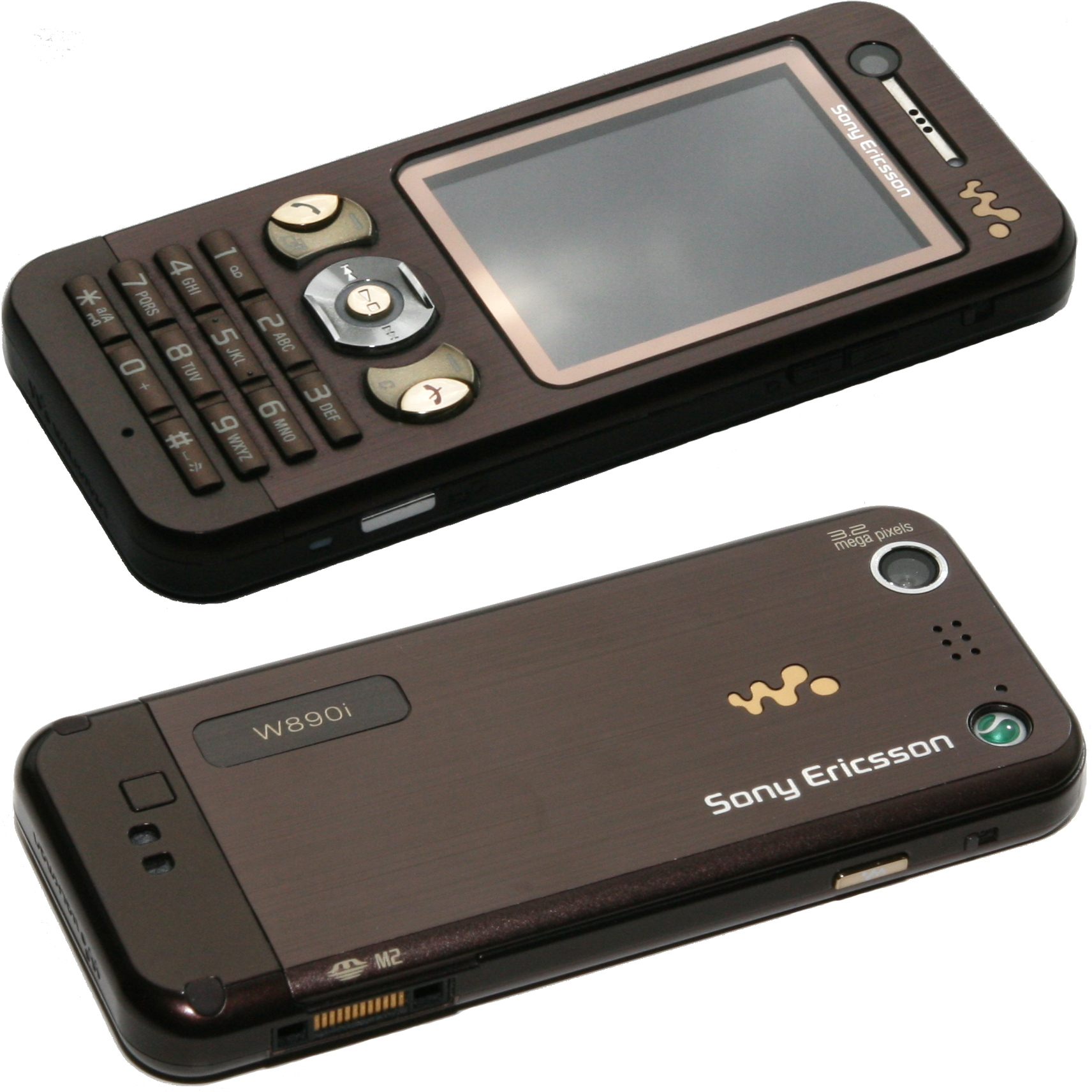
- Manufacturer: Sony Ericsson
- Predecessor: Sony Ericsson W880
- Compatible networks: GSM quadband and UMTS 2100
- Form factor: Candybar
- Dimensions: 4.1 x 1.9 x 0.4 in. 104 x 46.5 x 9.9 mm
- Weight: 2.8 oz 78 g
- Operating system: Sony Ericsson proprietary OS (A200)
- Storage: 28 MB Internal
- Removable storage: Memory Stick Micro M2
- Rear camera: 3.2 megapixel without AF
- Front camera: Video Recording QVGA (320x240)
- Display: 240x320 pixels (QVGA), 2", 262,144 (18-bit) color TFT LCD
- Connectivity: HSDPA, EDGE, Bluetooth, USB 2.0
- Data inputs: Keypad
- Other: FM radio with RDS; Walkman player 3.0

The Sony Ericsson W890i is a high-end mobile phone released on March 3, 2008. It is available in the colours of "Mocha Brown", "Sparkling Silver" and "Espresso Black", at 9.9 mm thick. It shares many design clues with the original iPhone, mainly on the rear. Its casing is made up of highly polished aluminium with little use of plastic.

== Features ==
The phone incorporates a 3.2-megapixel camera taking photos in 2048x1536px resolution without flash or autofocus and video is recorded at QVGA resolution. An FM radio, which was lacking on the W880i, is also included. The phone utilizes version 3.0 of the Walkman system software and includes SensMe technology, whereby the user can select which mood of music they would like to listen to. It also has a 950mAh Li-Po battery.
