= Sony Ericsson W880i =

Mobile phone model

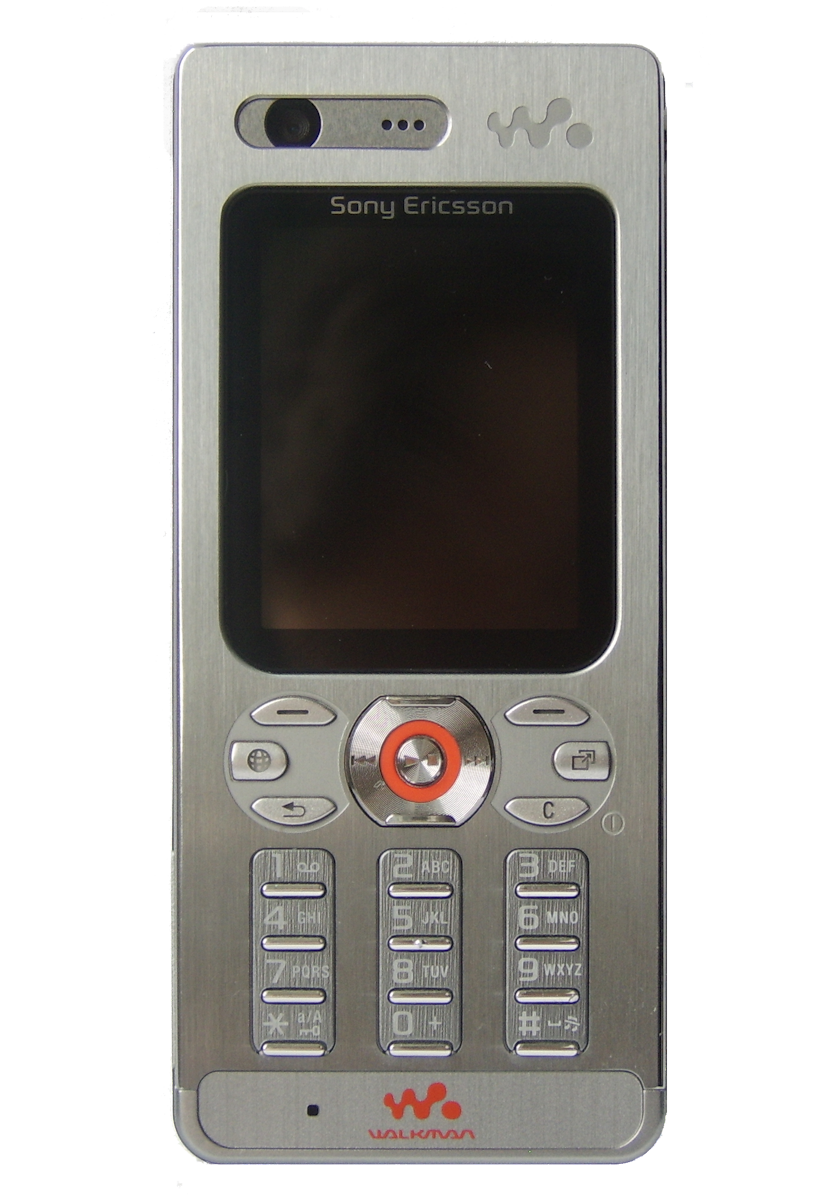
- Predecessor: Sony Ericsson W810
- Successor: Sony Ericsson W890
- Compatible networks: GSM 900/1800/1900 and UMTS
- Form factor: Candybar
- Dimensions: 102×46.5×9.4 mm (4.02×1.83×0.37 in)
- Weight: 71 g (2.5 oz)
- Memory: 16 MB Internal, Memory Stick Micro M2 (up to 2 GB)
- Display: 240x320 pixels (QVGA), 1.8 inches, 262,144 (18-bit) color TFT LCD
- Connectivity: WCDMA, GPRS, Bluetooth, USB 2.0

The Sony Ericsson W880i is a mobile phone that was announced on 6 February 2007 and released in spring 2007. Part of Sony Ericsson's Walkman series, the phone has been popular due to its tiny dimensions and low weight. At only 9.4 mm thick, the W880 was one of the few phones on the market that were thinner than 1 cm (10 mm), the other notable example being the Nokia 5310 from later that year.

The W880i is available in three different colour schemes; "Flame Black", "Steel Silver" and "Pitch Black". There is a fourth color scheme, "Gold", which is exclusively available to Vodafone. There is also a non-3G version of the phone; the Sony Ericsson W888c.

== Features ==
The W880 features a 2.0-megapixel camera (without autofocus and flash) and a secondary VGA camera located on the front which can be used for 3G video conferencing. The phone also comes with Walkman Player v2.0, which gives a faster interface with very few differences from the previous version. The phone comes with 16 MB of memory and a 1 GB M2, but can be expanded up to 2 GB via the Memory Stick Micro slot. Other features include photo/video editing, picture blogging, web gallery uploading, QCIF video recording, and 3G data transferring capabilities of up to 384 kbit/s. This model shares all of the features the W850i has except the form factor and the lack of radio and camera light. The phone's CPU is an ARM 9 processor clocked at 206 MHz.

=== Size ===
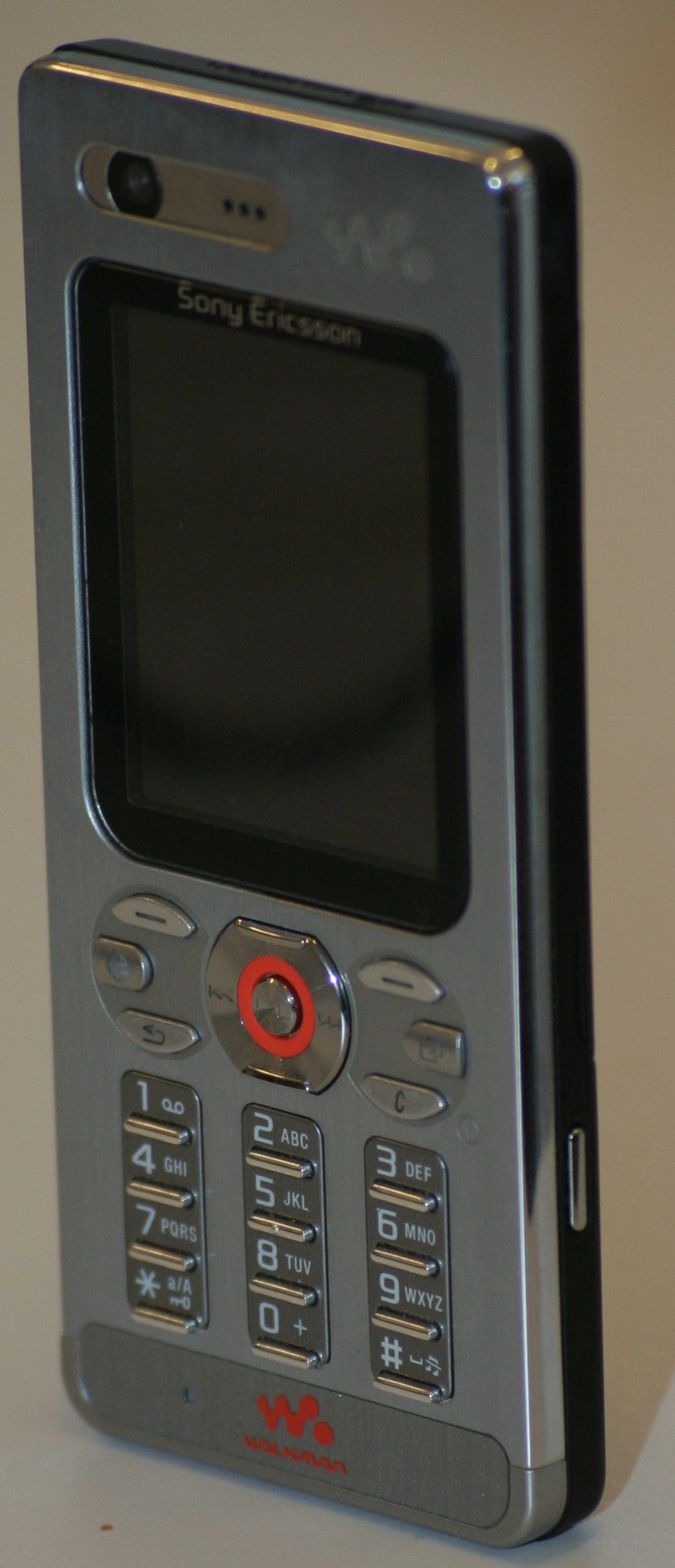
Side view

The W880 was Sony Ericsson's thinnest phone when released, and one of the slimmest on the market. There were few phones less than a centimetre thick beforehand, most notably Motorola FONE F3 and Samsung X820.

== Compatibility ==
Supports a wide range of audio, video and image formats, next to software:

- Audio: MIDI, MP3, MP4, AAC, AAC+, M4A, 3GP, AMR, WMA, WAV, Real 8 and G-MDI.
- Video: MP4, 3GPP, H263 and Real 8.
- Image: JPEG, GIF, BMP, PNG, WBMP, SVG
- Software: Java ME, Flash (only Flash Lite 1.1).

== Reception ==
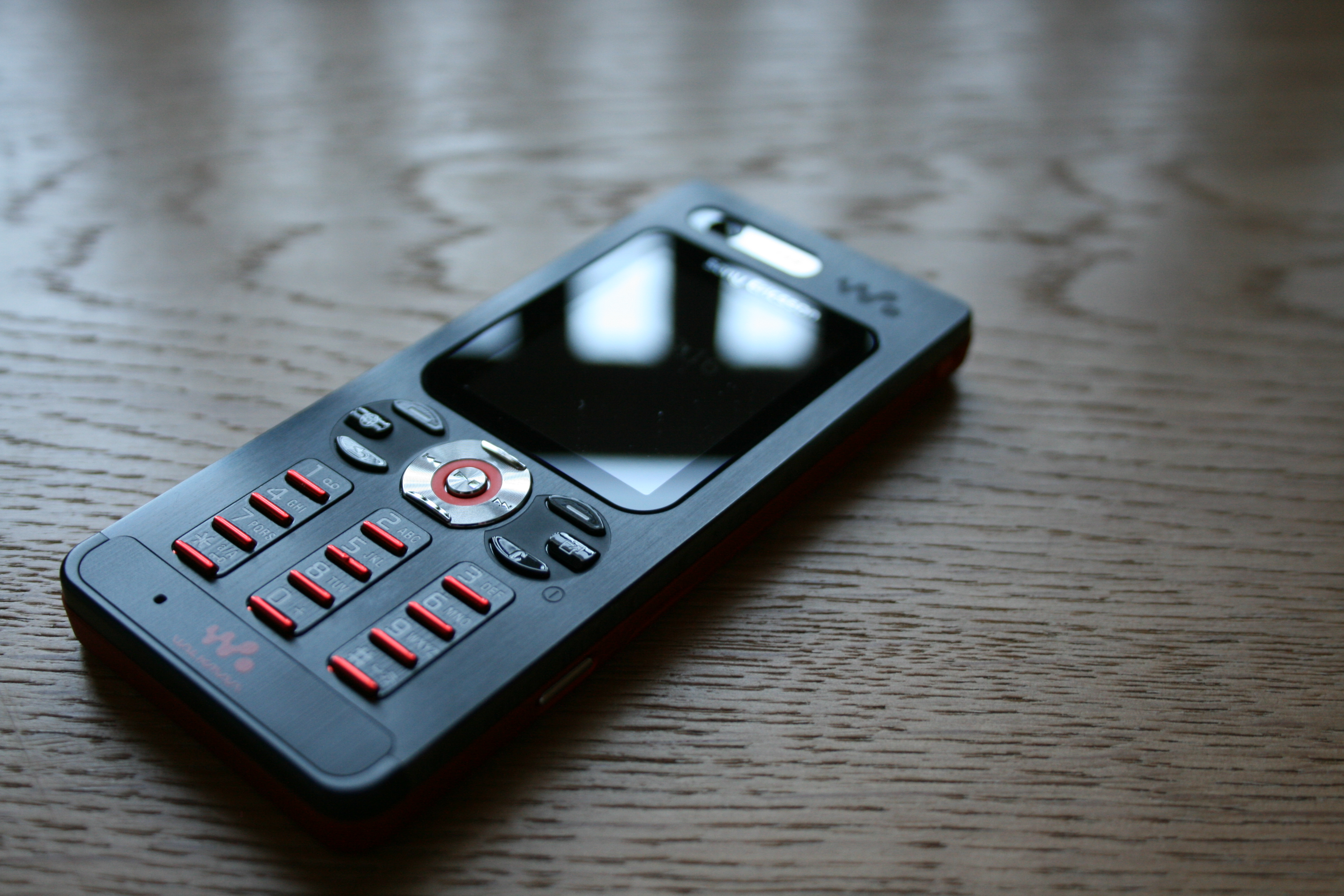

Writing for Know Your Mobile, Mat Toor praised the fact that the W880i had 3G, a screen that was "easy on the eye [sic]" and its TrackID software which could identify music from a 10 second sample. Toor, however, bemoaned the lack of autofocus and flash on the camera, stating that it was only really useful for outdoor use as well as the size of the keys, which he compared to "metallic grains of rice". Furthermore, in testing, he found that the battery lasted nowhere near the 425 hours Sony claimed in its advertising. In conclusion he felt that the drawbacks were "niggles" and that the W880i was a contender for the best phone of 2007.

The W880i was superseded by the Sony Ericsson W890i later in 2007.

== See also ==
- Nokia 2630
- Nokia 5310
- Sony Ericsson T700
- Ericsson T66
