= Sony Ericsson W205 =

Mobile phone model

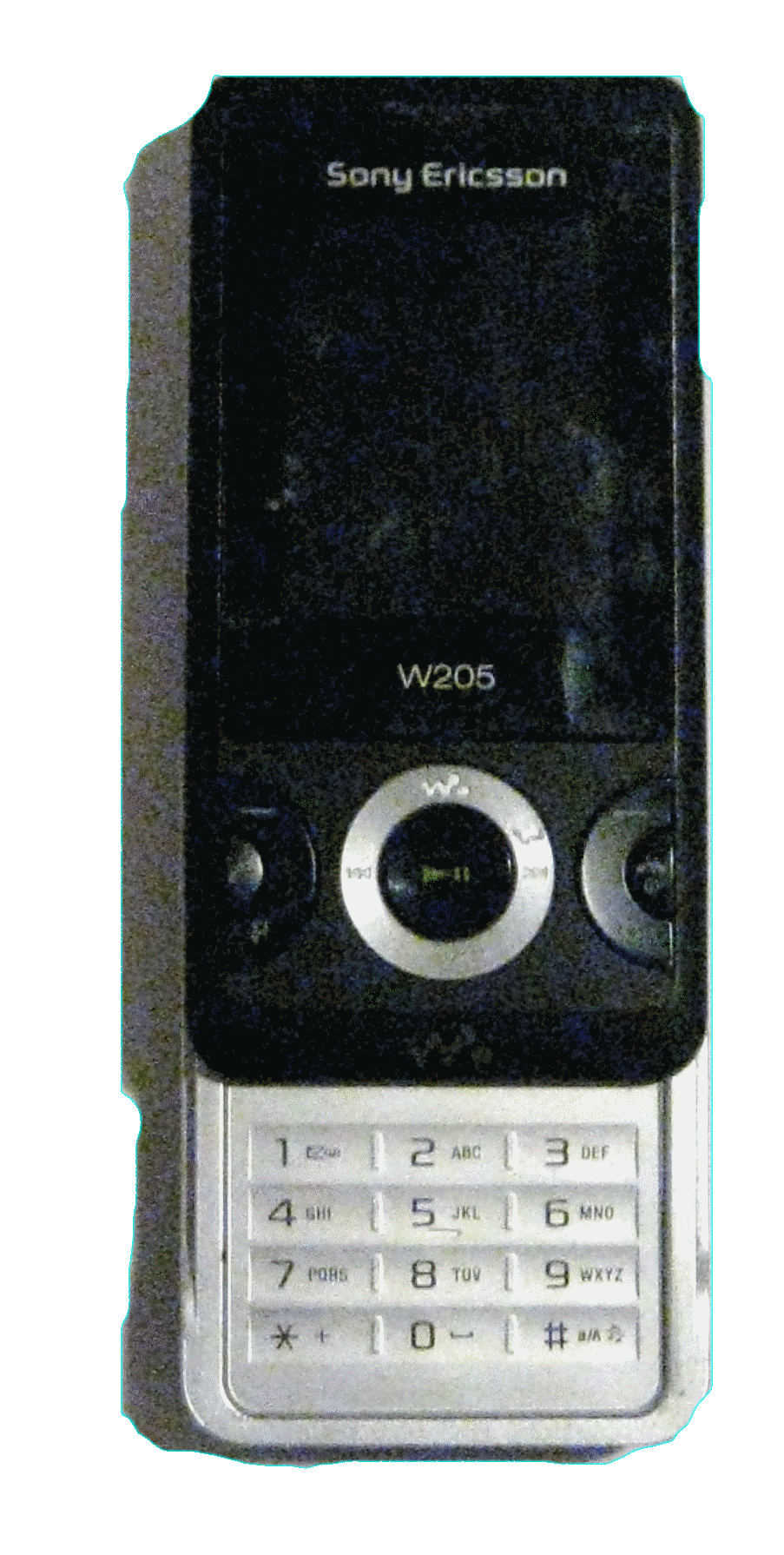
- Manufacturer: Sony Ericsson
- Availability by region: Q3 2009
- Successor: Sony Ericsson Spiro
- Compatible networks: GSM 900/1800 (850/1900 for W205a), GPRS
- Form factor: Slider
- Dimensions: 92×47×16.4 mm (3.62×1.85×0.65 in)
- Weight: 96 g (3 oz)
- Memory: 5 MB internal storage shared with other phone data
- Removable storage: Memory Stick Micro (M2) up to 2GB
- Battery: Type BST-33, Li-Poly; 3.6 V, 950maH, 3.4Wh: Standby: 425 h (17 d, 17 h); Talk time: 9 h; Playback time: 13 h
- Rear camera: 1.3 Mpix, 1280×1024 px; Video: 128×96@15fps
- Display: 16-bit high color (65k) TFT, 1.8", 128×160 pixels
- Sound: Walkman music player; FM radio
- Connectivity: Bluetooth, USB
- Data inputs: Keypad

Sony Ericsson W205 is an entry-level dual-band GSM/GPRS Walkman phone with a focus on music playback. It was announced on 7 April 2009 under the marketing tag 'your first Walkman phone'. The phone was available in black, white, pink and blue.

Stated standby time (GSM/GPRS) is up to 425 hours, talk time up to 9 hours, and music listening time up to 13 hours.

It was succeeded by the Sony Ericsson Spiro a year later.

== Hardware ==
The device is a slider phone featuring a 1.8-inch, 16-bit high color (65k) TFT screen, with a resolution of 128×160 pixels. It features a rear-mounted 1.3 MP camera with up to 2.2× digital zoom and video recording (mp4v 128×96 px, at 15 frames per second).

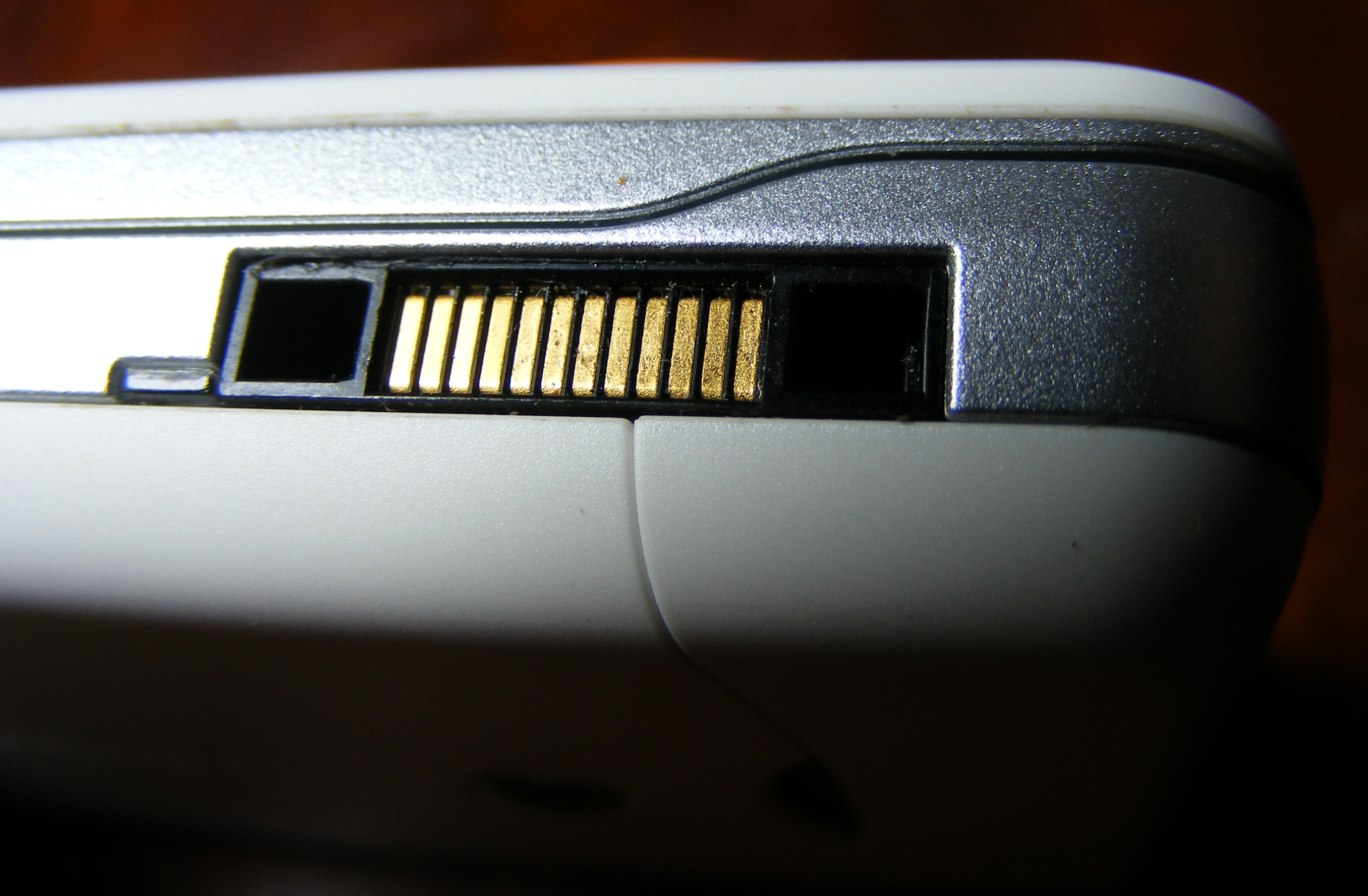
FastPort female plug on a Creamy White W205.

The phone's front side presents menu access, call start and stop, and navigation buttons that also double as playback controls. The left side of the phone includes hardware volume buttons and the FastPort outlet. The top right side features the memory card inlet covered with a rubber band. In addition to the camera, the back of the device includes a speakerphone for hands-free audio playback without the headset.

The W205 contains an FM radio with RDS and an integrated antenna. The ability is provided to record radio either onto the 5 MB of internal memory or up to 2 GB of external memory to the Memory Stick Micro (M2) memory card. Such recordings can also be saved and used as ringtones. Activation of the FM radio requires a FastPort-compatible headset connected to the phone; the headset is required to function as an antenna.

The phone employs a proprietary FastPort outlet for the charger, headphones and the data cable. The latter facilitates USB connectivity, and requires the model DCU-60 or compatible cable. USB charging via FastPort is not supported with this phone model.

== Software ==
Software-wise, the device includes a Walkman player, which supports MP3 and AAC files, plus playlists, shuffle and loop modes, display of album art, and track identification via Sony Ericsson's TrackID service. Uncharacteristically for a device that was Walkman-branded and specifically marketed as audio-centric, its playback software does not feature an equalizer or equalizer presets for different musical genres.

On Internet access, the phone features a native WAP 2.0 browser and the Java-based Opera Mini. Different connectivity profiles can be configured for the native browser and Java apps (Opera Mini); like, respectively, 'WAP' for very light-weight browsing and 'Internet' for complex content.

Other features include multiple phonebooks, copy and paste functionality of text snippets and numbers, a file manager, sound recorder, alarm clock with several alarm settings, calendar, torchlight (uses the phone's screen), tasks, notes, timer, stopper, and calculator.

== Marketing ==
In September 2009, the W205 was available in the UK for £99.99 SIM-free; at the time, UK Vodafone offered it for £40 on a pay-as-you-go plan.

At the start of the 2010 Football World Cup on June 11, 2010, South African mobile operator and official event sponsor MTN had exclusive rights to the W205 phone, which was pre-loaded with World Cup-related content, such as FIFA wallpapers, themes, screensavers, and the FIFA 2009 soundtrack.
