= Sony Ericsson K810i =

Sony Ericsson mobile phone

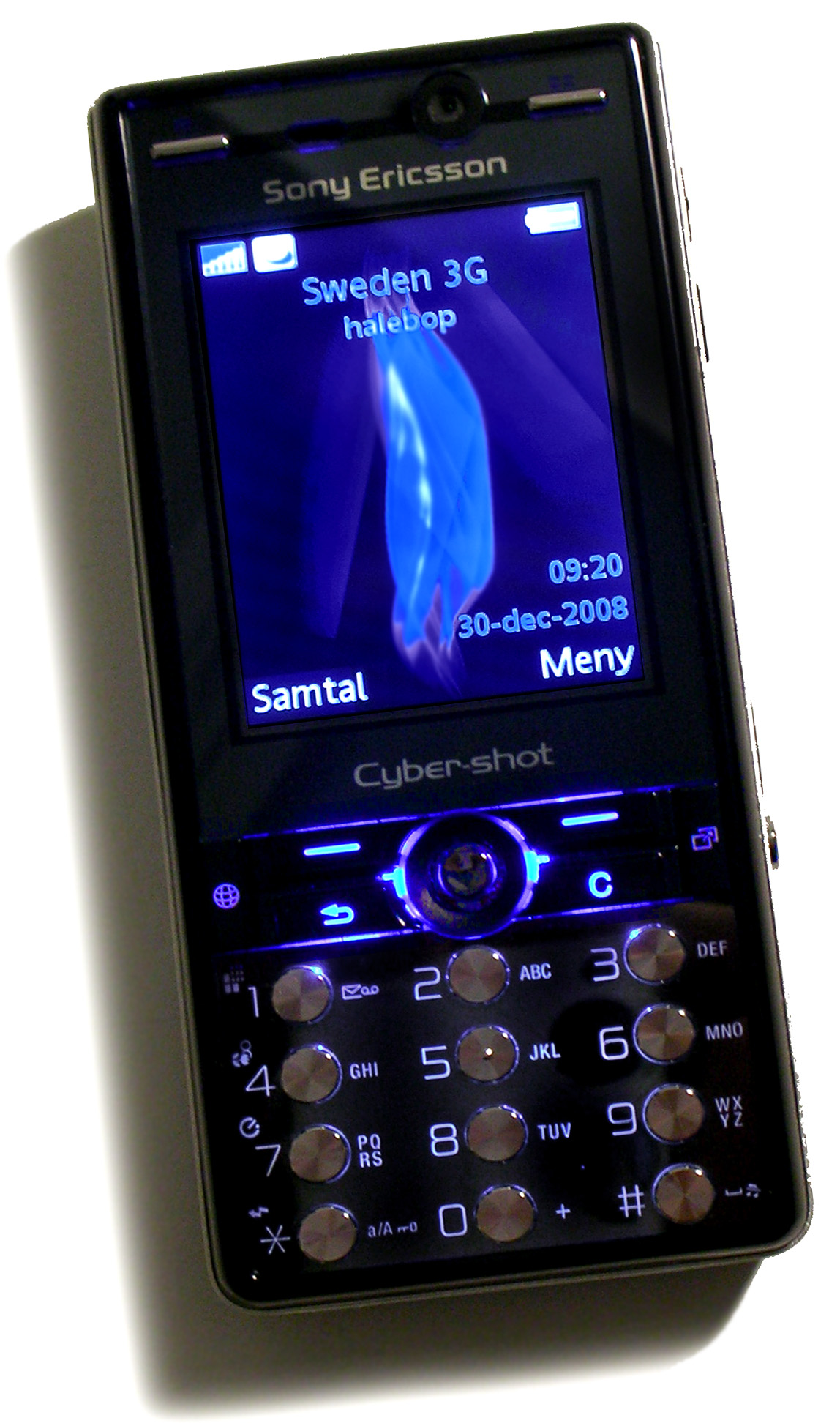
- Manufacturer: Sony Ericsson
- Series: K
- Availability by region: February 2007
- Predecessor: Sony Ericsson K800
- Successor: Sony Ericsson K850
- Compatible networks: GSM/GPRS, UMTS
- Form factor: Bar
- Dimensions: 106.0×48.0×17.0 mm (4.17×1.89×0.67 in)
- Weight: 103.0 g (4 oz)
- Operating system: Sony Ericsson Java Platform 7 (Java ME)
- Memory: 70 MB
- Removable storage: Memory Stick Micro (M2) (support up to 8 GB)
- Battery: 900 mAh Li-poly
- Rear camera: 3.2 MP
- Front camera: VGA
- Display: 240x320 pixels QVGA (262,144 colour TFT)
- Connectivity: USB 2.0, Bluetooth 2.0, IR port
- Data inputs: Keypad
- Development status: Active

The Sony Ericsson K810i is a dual-mode UMTS phone with a 3.2 Megapixel camera with autofocus and 16x digital zoom. It has the full range of mobile entertainment and business features including video telephony, Memory Stick Micro removable storage (up to 8 GB available), picture blogging, full HTML browser, RSS feed support, and music and video players. It is a later iteration of the Sony Ericsson K800i, and both phones have since been succeeded by the Sony Ericsson K850i.

== Overview ==
The 17 mm thin 3G K810i has a 240x320 pixels, QVGA, 262,144 colour display and supports Sony Ericsson Java Platform 7 (JP-7) with a range of JSRs, including Advanced Multimedia Supplements (JSR 234) for enhanced camera and image handling. Mobile Java 3D gaming is supplemented with A/B gaming buttons for landscape mode gaming. K810i is designed after Sony Ericsson K800i, with many similarities with the latter. It is succeeded by Sony Ericsson K850i, the last of the K series phones. K810i is available in 3 colours: Noble Blue, Pulse Red, Golden Ivory.

== Specifications ==
- Networks
  - GSM/GPRS 900/1800/1900
  - Dual-mode UMTS 2100
- Screen
  - 240x320 pixels 262,144 colour TFT QVGA
- OS
  - Sony Ericsson Java Platform 7 (Java ME)
- Internet
  - WAP 2.0, XHTML
  - Browser: Access Netfront 3.3
- Messaging
  - EMS/SMS/MMS
  - Email: POP3, IMAP4
- Multimedia Support
  - Audio: MP4, MP3, M4A, 3GPP, WAV, MIDI, RealAudio 8, eMelody, iMelody, RHZ, XMF, WMA
  - Video: MP4, 3GPP, RealVideo 8, WMV
  - Image: JPEG, GIF, BMP, PNG, SVG, WBMP
  - Streaming: RTSP (according to 3GPP)
- Local Connectivity
  - USB 2.0
  - Bluetooth 2.0
  - IR

== Camera ==
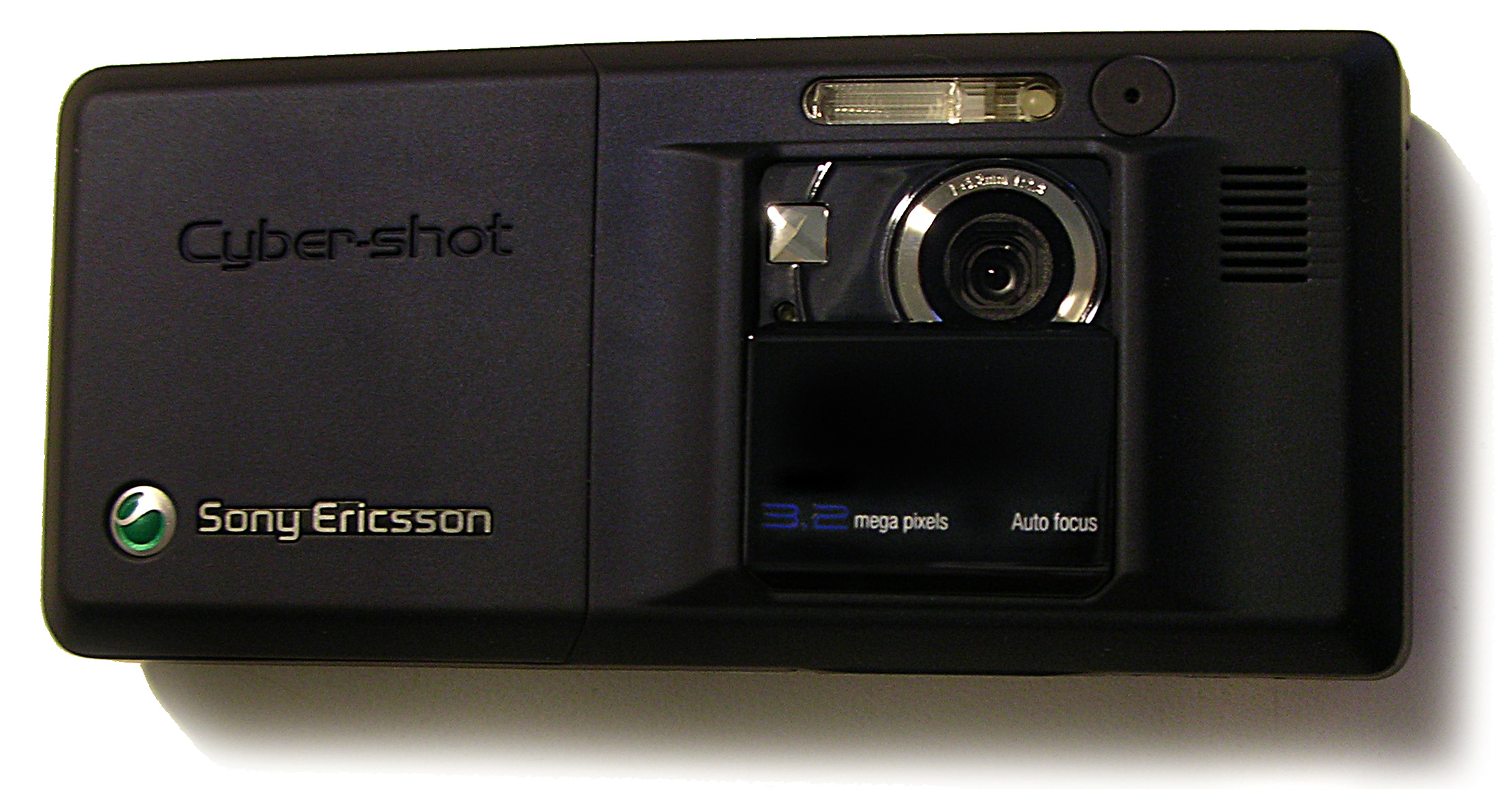
The phone software automatically switches to camera mode as soon as the lens cover is slid down.

K810i is Cyber-shot branded and hence includes some of the Cyber-shot features.

- 3.2 MP Camera
- Photo fix
- BestPic
- Digital Zoom - up to 16x
- Image stabiliser
- Picture blogging
- Red-eye reduction
- Video stabiliser
- Xenon flash
- Auto focus
- Video recording

There are 2 built-in cameras. For high quality imaging, the main 3.2 MP camera provides the above features. Also, there is horizontal user interface for easier camera handling. The active lens cover and the illuminable camera icons contribute to the intuitive operation of the K810i camera. The phone is also equipped with a VGA video call camera.

== Main Features ==
- Cyber-shot Camera
- PictBridge
- Picture Blogging
- Push Email
- Bluetooth
- PlayNow
- TrackID
- 3G Video Calling
- RSS Reader
- Audio/Video Recording
- Web
- FM Radio

== Variant ==
Sony Ericsson K818c, the non-3G version of K810i developed for mainland China
