= Sony Ericsson W580i =

Mobile phone model

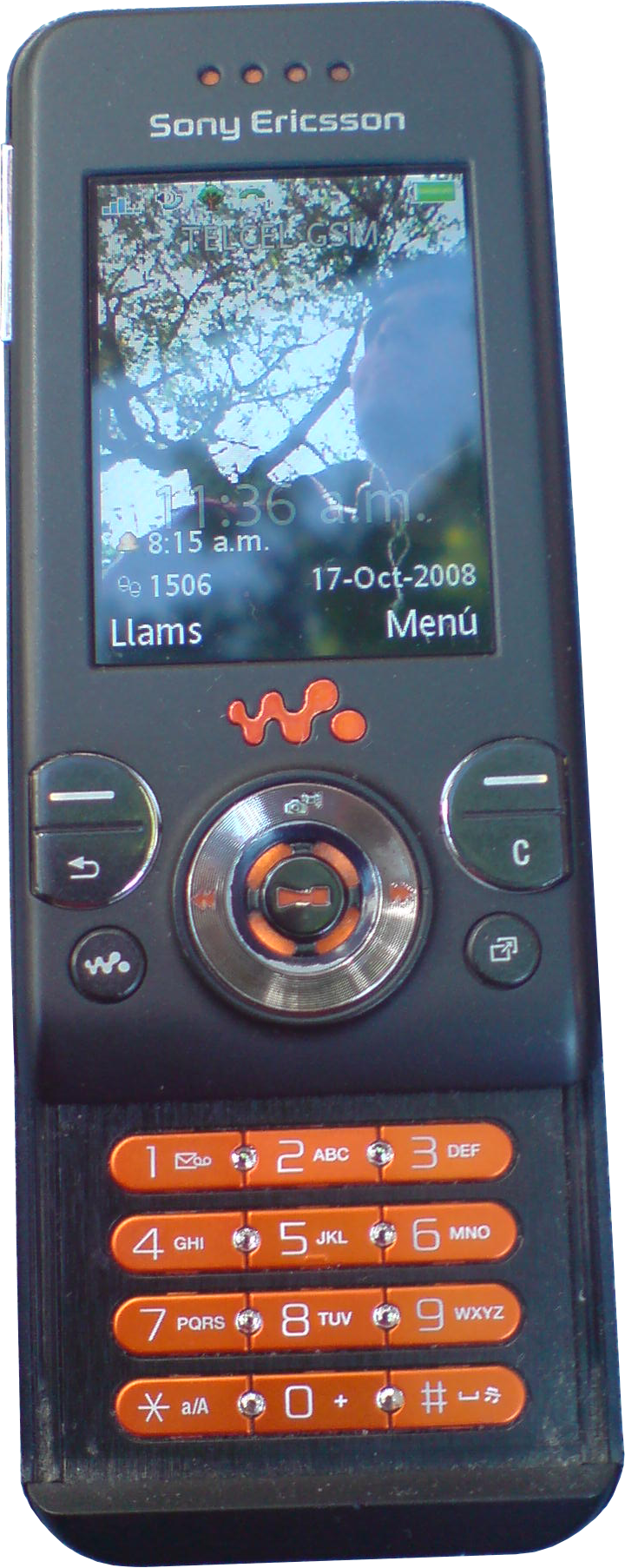
- Manufacturer: Sony Ericsson
- Availability by region: (Hong Kong) July, 2007; (Canada) August, 2007; (Hungary) October, 2007; (United States) October, 2007 (AT&T Wireless)
- Predecessor: Sony Ericsson W830i
- Successor: Sony Ericsson W595
- Related: Sony Ericsson W910; Sony Ericsson S500 (non-Walkman equivalent)
- Compatible networks: GSM (850/900/1800/1900); Quad band EDGE; GPRS
- Form factor: Compact Slider
- Dimensions: 3.9 × 1.8 × 0.5 in 99 × 47 × 14 mm
- Weight: 3.3 oz (94 g)
- Operating system: Sony Ericsson proprietary OS
- Memory: 12 MB internal
- Removable storage: Memory Stick Micro (M2) (up to 8 GB)
- Battery: 900 mAh Li-Pol battery
- Rear camera: 2.0 megapixel
- Display: 2" 262,144 TFT LCD; 240 × 320 pixels
- Connectivity: Bluetooth (2.0); USB (2.0 proprietary, and, for the memory stick, 2.0 mass storage device)
- Data inputs: Keypad; Motion sensor

The Sony Ericsson W580i is a mid range slider style mobile phone in the Walkman series. The phone was announced on 26 March 2007 and was released in early August. It is a 2.5G Quad-band (850/900/1800/1900) GSM phone with EDGE capabilities and has a 2 megapixel camera. It comes in "Style White", "Boulevard Black", "Metro Pink", "Urban Grey", "Jungle Green" and "Velvet Red".

The phone made an appearance in Ciara and 50 Cent's music video, "Can't Leave 'Em Alone". It was also shown in the films You Don't Mess with the Zohan and Paul Blart: Mall Cop. The phone contains the ability to detect motion on a limited scale. For instance, the phone keeps track of how many steps the user has taken. The W580i has a special feature, Shake Control, which also makes use of motion sensing. When listening to music in the Walkman feature, depressing the Walkman button and subsequently shaking the phone will select a song at random.

The W580i is the predecessor to the Sony Ericsson W595, and related, non-Walkman equivalent is Sony Ericsson S500.

== Specifications ==
=== Design ===
- Colours: Style White, Metro Pink, Boulevard Black, Urban Grey, Jungle Green, Velvet Red, and Jazzy Purple
- Navigation key
- Picture wallpaper
- Wallpaper animation
- Size
  - 99 × 47 × 14 mm
  - 3.9 × 1.8 × 0.5 inches
- Weight
  - 94 g
  - 3.3 oz
- Screen
  - 262,144 color TFT LCD
  - 240x320 pixels

=== Entertainment ===
- 3D games
- Java
- FM radio with search function and RDS
- Video streaming
- Video play
- Music
  - Bluetooth stereo (A2DP)
  - Mega Bass
  - PlayNow
  - Shake control
  - Supports music file formats MP3, AAC
  - TrackID
- Camera
  - 2.0 megapixel
  - Digital zoom 2.5× (Only available in VGA 640x480)
  - Digital zoom 4× (Only available in video recording)
  - Picture blogging
  - Video recording

=== Communication ===
- Polyphonic ringtones
- Speakerphone
- Vibrating alert
- Mp3 ring tones

=== Connectivity ===
- Bluetooth technology
- Modem
- PictBridge
- Synchronization PC
- USB mass storage
- Bluetooth 2.0 support

=== Networks ===
- Quad band EDGE
- GSM (850/900/1800/1900)
- GPRS

=== Internet ===
- RSS feeds
- Access NetFront web browser

=== Memory ===
- 13 MB internal
- Memory Stick Micro (M2) support (up to 8 GB)

=== Messaging ===
- Email
- Instant messaging (IM)
- Picture messaging (MMS)
- Predictive text input
- Sound recorder
- Text messaging (SMS)

=== Organizer ===
- Alarm clock
- Calculator
- Calendar
- Flight mode
- Notes
- Phone book
- Stopwatch
- Tasks
- Timer

=== Special features ===
- Pedometer
- Shake control
- Shortcut: enter any number from 1-999 and hold # to check SIM contacts
- Shortcut: enter 0 and hold # to check call history

=== Battery ===
- 930 mAh Li-Pol battery
- Standby time: up to 570 hours
- Talk time: up to 15 hours

== Included accessories ==
- Li-Pol battery
- Compact wall charger
- User manual
- USB cable DCU-60
- Stereo headset HPM-70
- Memory Stick Micro (M2) (capacity varies by wireless carrier)
- Disc2Phone music management software
- Charger CST-75
- Multi-language warning

== See also ==
- LG Chocolate
- Nokia 5610 XpressMusic
- Nokia 5300
- Samsung J700
- Samsung E250
- Samsung D900
- Sony Ericsson W850
- Sony Ericsson W910
