= Sony Ericsson W902 =

Mobile phone model

- Manufacturer: Sony Ericsson
- Availability by region: Q4 2008
- Related: Sony Ericsson W302; Sony Ericsson W595; Sony Ericsson C902
- Compatible networks: GSM 850, GSM 900, GSM 1800, GSM 1900, EDGE, UMTS 2100, HSDPA
- Form factor: Candybar
- Dimensions: 49.0 × 110.0 × 11.7 mm (1.9 × 4.3 × 0.5 inches)
- Weight: 99.8 g (4 oz)r
- Operating system: Sony Ericsson OS
- Memory: Phone memory 25 MB; Memory Stick Micro (M2) support (up to 16 GB)
- Removable storage: Memory Stick M2
- Battery: Li-Po 900 mAh
- Rear camera: 5 mega pixel and QVGA@30fps Video Recording
- Display: 2.2 inches (240x320 pixels); 262.144 color TFT
- Data inputs: Keypad

The Sony Ericsson W902 is a mobile phone and part of the Walkman series of phones. It was announced in July 2008 (alongside the W302 and W595) and released in October 2008. The W902 is a higher end Walkman phone, featuring not only the latest state of the art Walkman 3.0 player, but also a 5.0 mega pixel camera with autofocus and flash, similar to that of many Cyber-Shot range phones, leading to some nicknaming this model 'Cyber-Walkman-Shot'.

The W902 also features a series of buttons down the side so that control of music is easily accessible. Auto-rotate means that the media player will switch to landscape mode if the phone is held on its side. This also applies to the web browser. The W902 also features shake control, meaning the music can be changed with 'the flick of a wrist', as can the volume of the music.

As of early 2009, the W902 has not been well publicised, and as such, there are fewer of them around, meaning they have maintained their value exceptionally well.
