= Sony Ericsson K850i =

Cell phone model

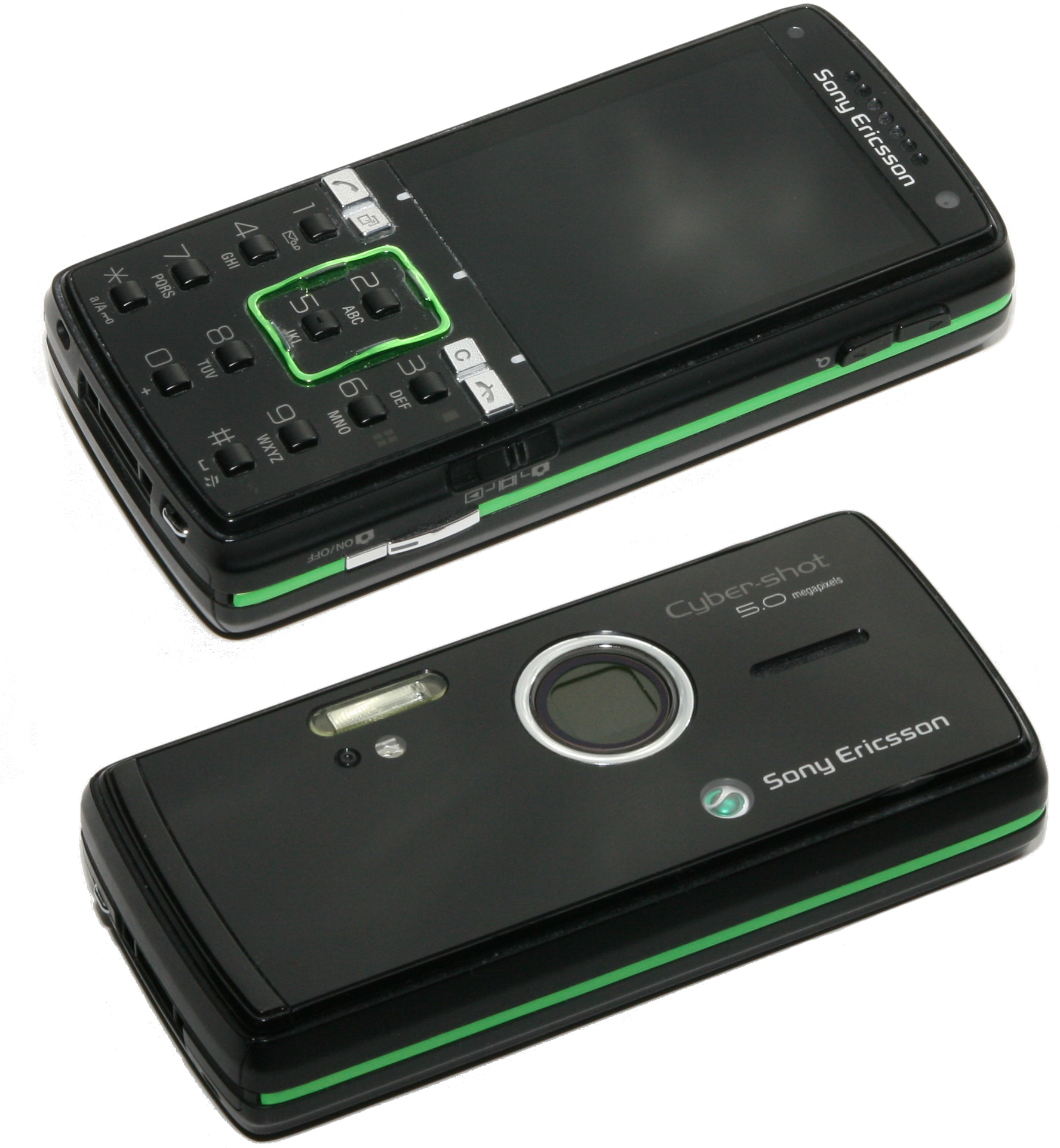
- Manufacturer: Sony Ericsson
- Series: K
- First released: October 2007; 18 years ago
- Predecessor: Sony Ericsson K800; Sony Ericsson K810i
- Successor: Sony Ericsson C905
- Compatible networks: UMTS 850, UMTS 1900, UMTS 2100, GSM 850, GSM 900, GSM 1800, GSM 1900
- Dimensions: 102×48×17 mm (4.02×1.89×0.67 in)
- Weight: 118 g (4 oz) (0.260 lb)
- Memory: 40 MB integrated, Memory Stick Micro (M2) 512 MB in box, SanDisk microSD transflash supported
- Battery: 930 mAh (Li-Polymer)
- Display: 2.2” QVGA (240×320 pixels), 262,144 (18-bit) colour TFT LCD
- Connectivity: 3.5 Mbit/s HSDPA, W-CDMA, EDGE, GPRS, HSCSD, CSD, Bluetooth 2.0, USB (with Mass Storage Mode, PictBridge Mode support)

The Sony Ericsson K850i is a high-end mobile phone released in October 2007. It was announced in June 2007 as the flagship product in Sony Ericsson's K ("Kamera") series, with a 5 megapixel CMOS camera sensor. The K850 was the first Sony Ericsson phone released outside NTT DoCoMo to support microSD and microSDHC along with Sony's traditional M2. It also introduces the usage of three touch-sensitive softkeys right under the display and a new form of navigation button, omitting the classic joystick introduced with the Ericsson T68. The camera interface has been revamped to resemble the format of Cyber-shot digital cameras. According to the manufacturer, the UMTS talk time has been significantly increased to 3 hours 30 min over its predecessor, the K800 and K810. (K800 2 hrs 30 min). It was Sony Ericsson's first 3.5G HSDPA supporting mobile phone, and was also the first 3G “global” mobile with supporting all major operating network frequency in the world including GSM 850, GSM 900, GSM 1800, GSM 1900, HSDPA, UMTS 850, UMTS 1900, UMTS 2100.

== Design and features ==
The phone introduces a new button in the Cyber-shot line: on the right side a switch allows choosing between photo, video, and playback mode. The phone is available in the colours “Luminous Green”, “Velvet Blue” and “Quicksilver Black”.

Key features include:

- 3G video calling
- Cyber-shot 5 MP camera with Xenon flash and additional 3 LED flash for video recording
- Bluetooth 2.0 (10 m)
- Web Access (NetFront browser included)
- Exchange ActiveSync
- 3.5G high speed internet (Support up to 3.6 Mbit/s (download speed), 384 kbit/s (upload speed))
- Multiple audio playback (AAC, WAV, MP3, WMA)
- Built in Media Center (Sony PSP/PS3 XrossMediaBar menu)
- Video player with progressive fast-forward and slow motion
- Memory Stick slot to expand the memory to up to 16 GB.

== Camera Information ==
5.04 megapixel CMOS sensor, 16x digital zoom, natural color rendering, and built in xenon flash plus three additional LEDs for autofocusing and can be used for video recording. It also features Bestpic (Sony Ericsson's brand name for burst mode) which captures nine images in a row, then you can decide the ones you want to save. In camera mode the keypad is differently lit, so the user can easily find the camera shortcut buttons (Shoot mode, Scenes, Self-timer, Flash mode).

In common with the K810i and the K800, programs called Photo Fix, HP print and Face Warp are bundled with the K850i. Users can also easily increase the brightness and the contrast of the photo with PhotoFix and PhotoDJ.

Video recording is QVGA (320×240) at 30 frames per second. (K800 QCIF (176×144) @ 15 frame/s.) Supports Image and Video Stabilizer so videos and photos taken would be less likely to appear blurred and shaky.

== Specifications ==
Screen

- 2.2” QVGA (240×320 pixels), 262,144 (18-bit) colour TFT LCD

Available colours

- Luminous Green
- Velvet Blue
- Quicksilver Black

Sizes

- 102 × 48 × 17 mm (4 × 1.9 × 0.7 in)

Weight

- 118 g (4.2 oz)

Memory

- Memory Stick Micro (M2) 512 MB in box (maximum capable – 16 GB), a MicroSD card can also be used instead of the Memory Stick Micro card.
- Phone memory, approximately 40 MB depending on the pre-configuration settings

Battery

- BST-38 3.6 V, 930 mAh, lithium polymer
- Talk time GSM/UMTS: Up to 9 h/3 h 30 min
- Standby time GSM/UMTS: Up to 400 h/350 h
- Video call time (K850): Up to 3 h 20 min

== Variants ==
- K850i for international markets (UMTS / HSDPA tri band: UMTS 850, UMTS 1900, UMTS 2100; GSM / GPRS / EDGE quad band GSM 850, GSM 900, GSM 1800, GSM 1900)
- K858c for China (reduced to GSM/GPRS/EDGE 900/1800/1900, lack of front camera)

== Firmware list ==
- R1CA029 – First Release
- R1CA037 (SEUS – 2007-12-03)
- R1DA038 (SEUS – 2007-12-21)
- R1DA039 (SEUS – 2007-12-21)
- R1EA031 (SEUS – 2008-02-21)
- R1EA037 (SEUS – 2008-04-12)
- R1FA035 (SEUS – 2008-06-18)

SEUS – Sony Ericsson Update Service

== See also ==
Other notable 5-megapixel phones of the time

- Samsung G800
- Samsung G600
- LG Viewty
- Nokia N95
- Nokia N82
