= FastPort =

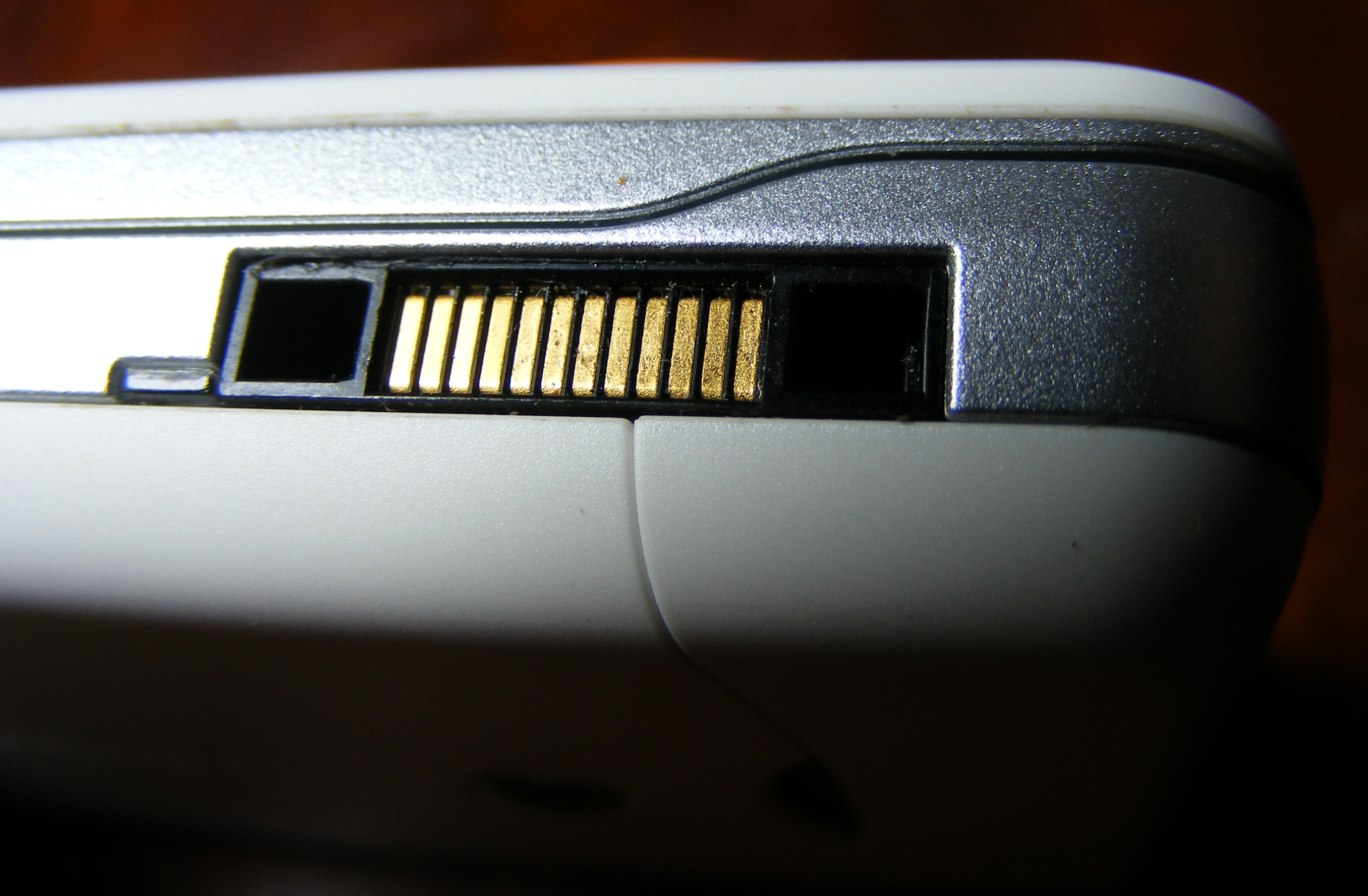
FastPort female plug on a Sony Ericsson W205 mobile phone.

The FastPort was a proprietary polyconnection interface used on all Sony Ericsson cellphones between 2005 and 2010. Designed in response to Nokia's proprietary Pop-Port, FastPort provided data transfer, charging, headset and speaker connections through a common interface. It was discontinued in 2010 and replaced with a micro-USB for charging and data, and a TRRS connection for audio (headphones).

== Functions ==
=== Transfer of data and files ===
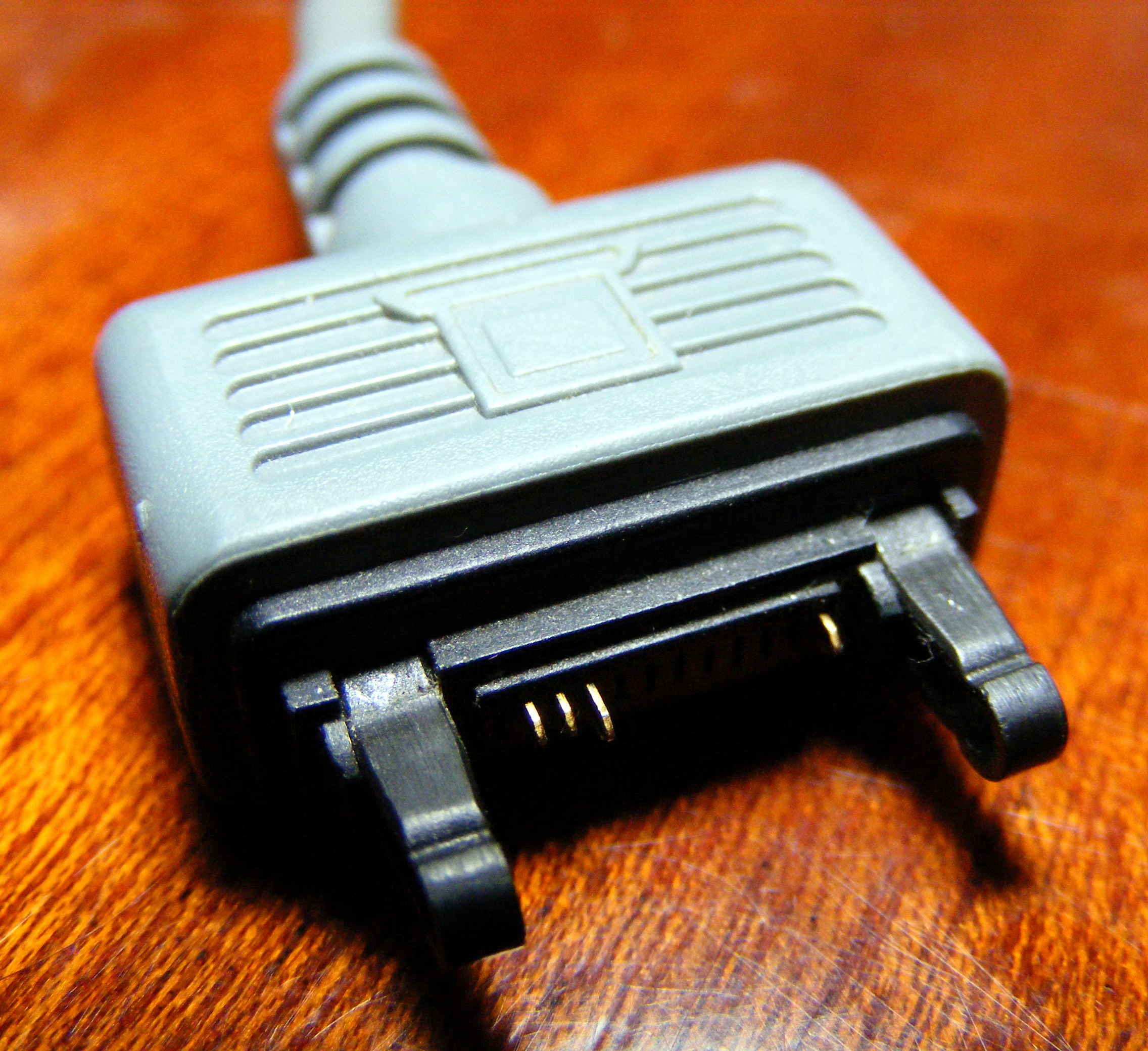
FastPort male plug on a Sony Ericsson DCU-60 data cable. The raised polarity key can be seen on the outer edge of the left hand side hook.

A USB FastPort-cable enables file and data transfer between a computer and a Sony Ericsson cellphone. Most models could act as a USB-storage-device, modem, phone and could load new firmware either with Sony Ericsson Update Service application, or with 3rd party software. FastPort was the interface to the PC to realize these functions.

=== Charging the battery/powering the phone ===
The port can charge the battery and power the phone while it is connected to, for example, a hands-free solution in a car. The FastPort became the only way to get external power to the phones. Chargers comes in several varieties, from 12/24 volt DC to use in cars, to 100-250 volt AC to use elsewhere. Some charger-models can only charge the phone (the cable is attached at the middle), in others all the connector pins through to the plug end, thus supporting data/signal transfer while the phone is being charged.

=== Sound accessories and headsets ===
The port also connects wired headsets or speakers, etc.

== Location ==
Originally, the FastPort was placed on the bottom edge of the phone (when viewed from the front), for a while on the top edge, and finally on the left edge. These changes caused some accessories to become unusable, such as holders with charging options and docks.

== Layout ==
The connector has 12 pins for electrical connections (both power and data), 2 double-sided "hooks" on the plug and matching holes in the phones connector for keeping the plug safely in place. One hook contains a small polarity key to prevent the connector being inserted upside down. The dimension of the connector on the phone is approximately 20 mm × 5 mm (0.79 in × 0.20 in). To help users identify the type of cable and see how to correctly insert the plug, a small symbol is placed on the side intended to be towards the front of the phone. Powerplugs display a small lightning bolt, headsets and hands-free-plugs show an old-fashioned headset, data-cables present a computer screen and music accessories reveal a note-sign.
