= Sony Ericsson W600 =

Mobile phone model

Sony Ericsson W600 (W550i)
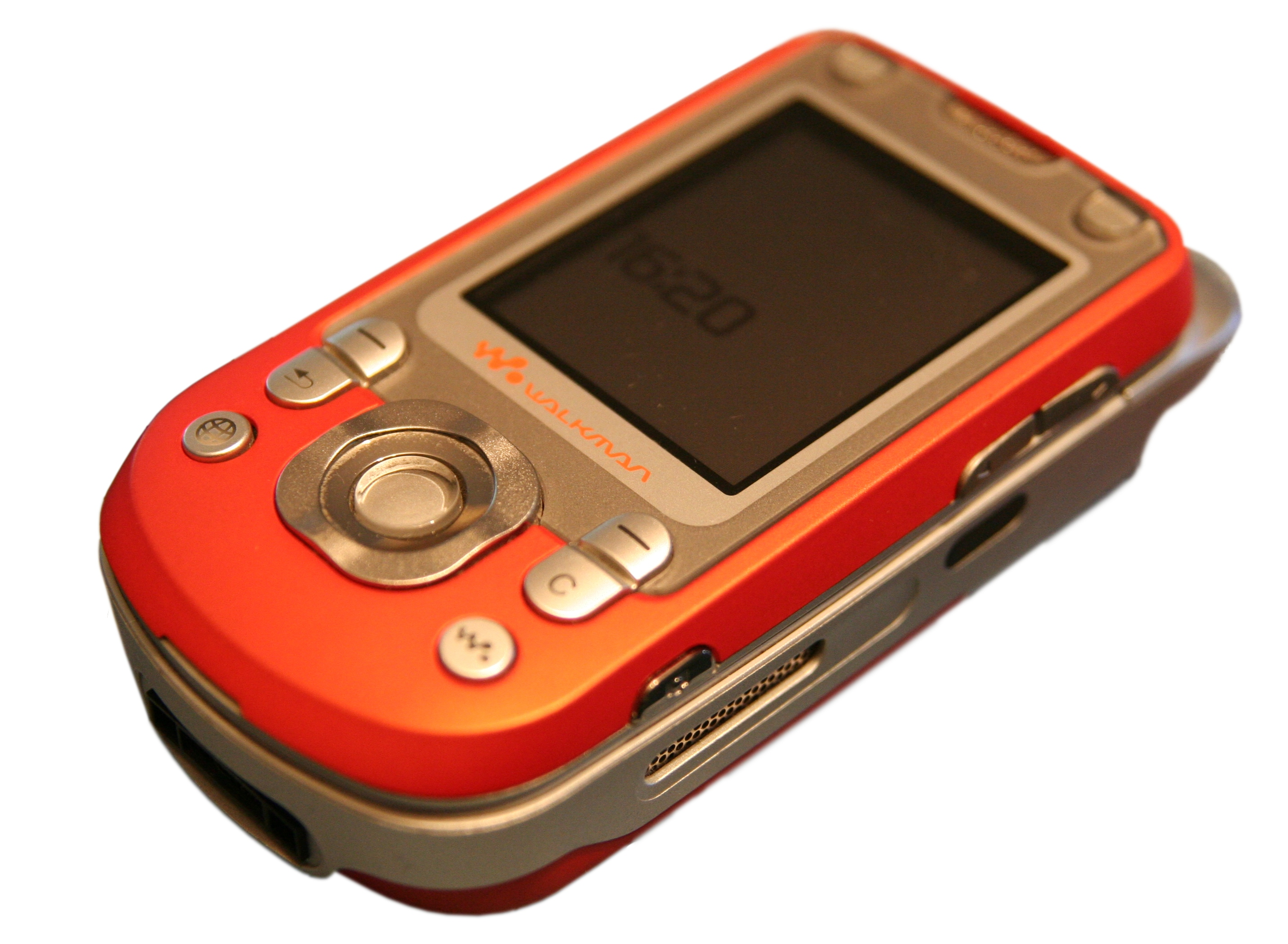
- Manufacturer: Sony Ericsson
- First released: 2005
- Availability by region: North America (W600); International (W550i)
- Predecessor: None
- Successor: Sony Ericsson W850i
- Related: Sony Ericsson W900i
- Compatible networks: Tri-band GSM 850/1800/1900MHz(W600); 900/1800/1900MHz(W550i)
- Dimensions: 93 x 46.5 x 22.5 mm (3.6 x 1.8 x 0.9 in.)
- Weight: 120g
- Memory: 256 MB Internal. No expandable memory slot.
- Rear camera: 1.3-megapixel
- Display: 176x220 pixels (QCIF+), 262,144 (18-bit) color TFT LCD
- Connectivity: EDGE, Bluetooth v2.0, IrDA, USB

Sony Ericsson W600 is Sony Ericsson's second phone with a swivel design. It is the first swivel phone to have the Walkman features. It offers 256 MB of internal memory (memory is not expandable), MP3/AAC(.M4A)/MIDI playback, FM radio, full internet browsing capabilities, 1.3-megapixel camera (photos/videos), and three separate speakers. It has a utility flash light. The W600 is a Tri band phone with EDGE. The W600 also feature Sony Ericsson's Java platform 6 (JP-6). It has two dedicated gaming buttons, designed to play like Game Boy, with built-in games like Worms 3D and Gauntlet, which can be played on multiplayer using Bluetooth. Using Bluetooth users can control their desktops.

The W600 is a North America-only phone; in other parts of the world, it is replaced by the W550i. W550i is virtually identical to the W600 except GSM frequency band.

A common problem with this phone is the top half (the screen and navigation buttons) detaching from the bottom half (the keypad). This problem is caused by four loose screws that hold the top half to a swiveling metal plate attached to the bottom half. It is possible for one to fix this on their own.
