= Sony Ericsson W595 =

Cell phone model

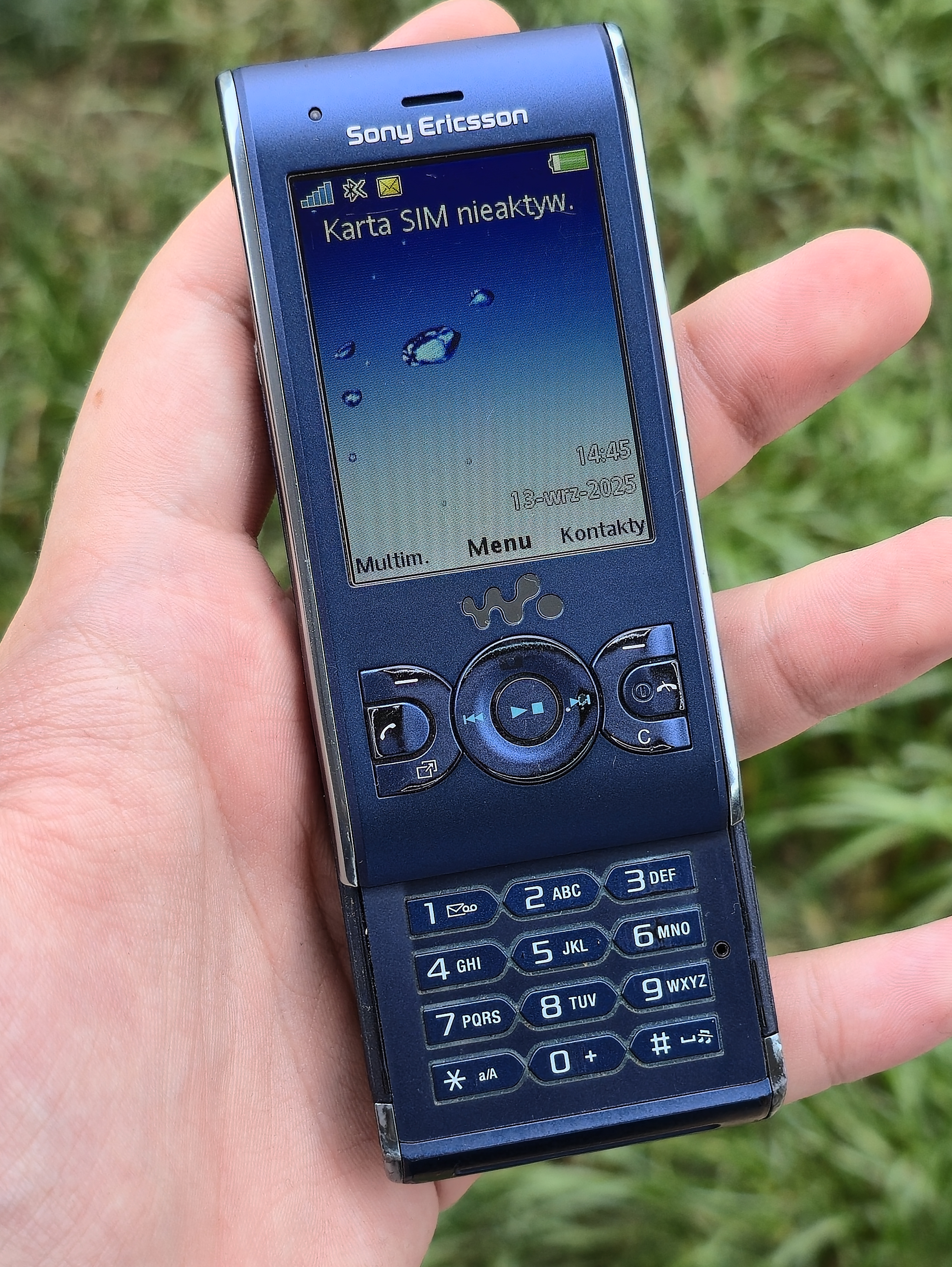
- Manufacturer: Sony Ericsson
- Availability by region: 29 September 2008
- Predecessor: Sony Ericsson W580
- Successor: None
- Related: Sony Ericsson W302; Sony Ericsson W902; Sony Ericsson C510; Sony Ericsson F902
- Compatible networks: GSM 900/850/1800/1900 and UMTS and HSDPA and EDGE
- Form factor: Sliding candybar
- Dimensions: 3.9 × 1.9 × 0.6 in. 100.0 × 47.0 × 14.0 mm
- Weight: 104 g (3.7 oz)
- Memory: 40 MB Internal, Memory Stick Micro M2
- Rear camera: 3.2 megapixel
- Front camera: not featured
- Display: 240×320 pixels (QVGA), 2.2", 262,144 (18-bit) color TFT LCD
- Connectivity: HSDPA, 3G, USB 2.0, Bluetooth 2.0
- Data inputs: Keypad, Accelerometer, Motion sensor

The Sony Ericsson W595 is a Walkman phone, and is the successor to the Sony Ericsson W580. It was announced on July 22, 2008 alongside the Sony Ericsson S510, Sony Ericsson W302 and Sony Ericsson W902, with the W302 being the low-end, the W595 the mid-range and the W902 the high-end.

== Features ==
=== Screen ===
- QVGA (320×240) 2.2" 18-bit colour LCD screen

=== Camera ===
- 3.2 megapixel CMOS (2048×1536)
- 2.5x digital zoom
- Video recording: QVGA (320×240) @15fps

=== Video calling ===
- Video calling is available

=== Connectivity ===
- Bluetooth
- USB 2.0
- 3G

=== Pre-installed games ===
- Extreme Air Snowboarding
- Guitar Rock Tour
- QuadraPop Music
- Racing Fever GT

=== Audio ===
- Walkman 3.0 with Mega Bass (Mega Bass works only with earphones, not on full volume)
- MP3, AAC, M4A and MIDI ringtones
- FM Radio with RDS, GraceNote Track ID service
- Walkman with shake control

=== Design ===
- 7 colours: 'Active Blue', 'Cosmopolitan White', 'Jungle Grey', 'Ruby Black', 'Lava Black', 'Peachy Pink' and 'Sandy Gold'.
- There is also a special edition design called 'Floral' (also sometimes referred to as 'Cosmopolitan Flower') which is based on the Cosmopolitan White colour with flowery design.
- There is also a second special edition design called 'W595s' which is a blue-white color with a slightly different design and it is exclusive to Orange
- There is also a third special edition design called 'W595 Ed Hardy' by Ed Hardy, the famous tattoo designer.

=== Storage ===
- 50 MB internal memory (18 MB available to user including all pre-loaded content), 1–4 GB M2 card included, up to 8 GB max.

=== Key features ===
Feature	Value
3G	HSDPA 3.6 Mbit/s
Wi-Fi	No
Bluetooth	Yes, File Transfer
OS	Java
Streaming	Browser Compatible

== Opening ==
Accessing the battery and/or SIM card slot is not straight-forward. There is a slight gap along the side of the cover, in which you slide a nail to carefully pry the cover off.
