= Sony Ericsson S500 =

Cell phone model

Sony Ericsson S500i
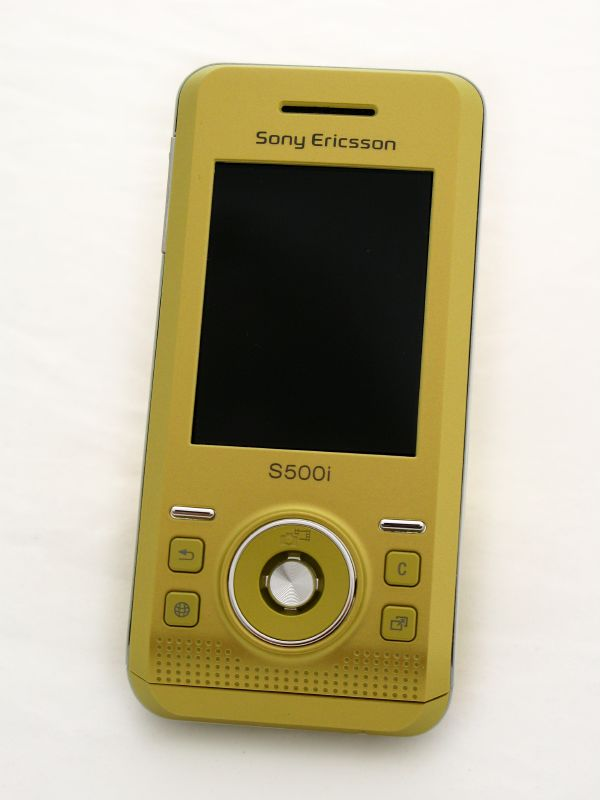
- Manufacturer: Sony Ericsson
- Availability by region: (Hong Kong) July, 2007 (Canada) unavailable (United States) October, 2007
- Related: Sony Ericsson W580i (Walkman equivalent)
- Compatible networks: -GSM (850/900/1800/1900) -Quad band EDGE -GPRS
- Form factor: Compact Slider
- Dimensions: 3.9 x 1.9 x 0.6 in. 99 x 47 x 14 mm
- Weight: 3.3 oz 94 gr
- Operating system: Sony Ericsson Java Platform 7
- Memory: 12 MB internal
- Removable storage: Memory Stick Micro (M2) (up to 2 GB)
- Battery: 900 mAh Li-Pol battery
- Rear camera: 2.0 megapixel
- Display: 2" 262,144 TFT LCD; 240x320 pixels
- Connectivity: -Bluetooth (2.0) -USB (2.0 proprietary)
- Data inputs: -Keypad

The Sony Ericsson S500i is a mobile phone manufactured by Sony Ericsson. The phone was announced in May 2007 and released in the 3rd quarter of 2007.

It is a slim slider phone, measuring 99 x 47 x 14 mm and weighing about 94 grams with its Li-Ion battery. It has 12.0 MB of internal memory, which can be expanded with a Memory Stick Micro. It includes a 2.0-megapixel camera with 4X zoom, and it provides video recording, streaming, and viewing. The music player can play AAC, AAC+, eAAC+ and MP3 files. The phone also has support for EDGE, GPRS and Bluetooth.

One feature is that the UI and external lights changes color depending on the time of day, day of the week or with the seasons. The largest women's magazine in Switzerland, annabelle, and Orange Switzerland are releasing the S500 as a fashion mobile phone which is specially targeted at women. This package features the S500 together with other fashionable accessories such as a lanyard.
