= Visual radio =

Ways of adding visuals to audio broadcasts

Visual radio is a generic term for adding visuals to audio radio broadcasts. Visual Radio is also a trademark for a Nokia product which delivers interactive FM radio over a data connection.

== Visual Radio ==
Visual Radio is a technology developed by Nokia. Visual Radio is built-in functionality available in an increasing number of phones that are already equipped with analog FM radio.

=== Workings ===
The audio is received via a regular analog FM radio embedded in the phone. A presentation of graphics and text, synchronized to the audio programming, is streamed to the phone over a data connection and the FM transmission chain is unaffected by the addition of Visual Radio.

=== Limitations ===
On phones with built-in Wi-Fi (tested on Nokia E51, E63, E66, E71, N78, N79, N81, N82 a, and N95 8GB), the Nokia application does not allow a Wi-Fi access point to be used for the data connection, only GPRS access points are allowed, allowing the possibility of revenue sharing between Nokia, the Radio stations and GPRS network operators.

=== Platform components ===
The platform is composed of three parts:

- A Visual Radio Tool that can be integrated with the radio station's legacy play-out system, so the interactive visual channel created by the radio station's content producer is synchronized with the audio programming.
- A Visual Radio server that handles the two-way traffic between the audience and radio stations;
- A Visual Radio client application on the mobile phone, that displays the interactive visual channel and takes care of user interaction.

The Visual Radio concept was created by Nokia and the platform was originally offered to radio stations and operators globally by HP. Since October 2007, Nokia has been collaborating with RCS Inc., of New York, whose Selector music scheduling system is used by thousands of radio stations around the world. RCS produces the second-generation version of the Visual Radio platform and also markets a similar product for the Internet (and most other digital platforms) under the RCS RadioShow brand.

The interactive visual channel is produced by the radio station. Interactivity options include quizzes, messaging, content download, commerce, etc.

=== Stations ===
Kiss FM (Finland) (now defunct) was the first radio station that started using Visual Radio. Other stations supporting Visual Radio included the UK's GWR Bristol, GWR Bath, Virgin Radio (now Absolute Radio), The Voice in Helsinki, Mediacorp stations in Singapore, Qmusic and Radio 538 (TV 538) in the Netherlands, Radio Mirchi station in New Delhi India, and Los 40 Principales in Spain. RAI has done test transmissions with Visual radio in some selected areas. In Belgium Radio Contact (Radio Contact Vision) and Q-music support Visual Radio as a TVTV statio not and they also transmit Visual Radio on the internet.

=== Devices supported ===
Nokia is making the Visual Radio client available to users of other phones, and has announced that they are producing a Java applet to enable this.

Nokia 3110 classic, Nokia 3120 classic, Nokia 3230, Nokia 3250, Nokia 5130 XpressMusic, Nokia 5200, Nokia 5230, Nokia 5233 Nokia 5300, Nokia 5310 XpressMusic, Nokia 5320 XpressMusic, Nokia 5330 XpressMusic, Nokia 5500 Sport, Nokia 5528/5530 XpressMusic Nokia 5610 XpressMusic, Nokia 5630 XpressMusic Nokia 5700, Nokia 5730 XpressMusic, Nokia 5800 XpressMusic Nokia 6085, Nokia 6086, Nokia 6110, Nokia 6111, Nokia 6120 Classic, Nokia 6121 Classic, Nokia 6125, Nokia 6131, Nokia 6136, Nokia 6151, Nokia 6210 Navigator, Nokia 6220 Classic, Nokia 6230, Nokia 6230i, Nokia 6233, Nokia 6234, Nokia 6267, Nokia 6270, Nokia 6280, Nokia 6288, Nokia 6290, Nokia 6300, Nokia 6301, Nokia 6500 Slide, Nokia 6600, Nokia 6630, Nokia 6670, Nokia 7370, Nokia 7373, Nokia 7500 Prism, Nokia 7710, Nokia E51, Nokia E63, Nokia E71, Nokia N70, Nokia N71, Nokia N72, Nokia N73, Nokia N76, Nokia N77, Nokia N78, Nokia N79, Nokia N80, Nokia N81, Nokia N82, Nokia N91, Nokia N92, Nokia N93, Nokia N93i, Nokia N95, Nokia N96, Nokia N97, Nokia N97 Mini, Nokia C6-00, Nokia C6-01, Nokia C7-00, Nokia N8.

== Other forms of visual radio ==
=== Spodtronic ===
In November 2005, Spodtronic began producing a visual radio service in Germany.

Their version of visual radio uses radio streaming over UMTS, with associated graphics and text sent down the same UMTS connection. A client is available for a user to download and install into their Nokia (series 60) mobile phone.

This product requires no extra infrastructure at the radio station since it works by using the metatags already present in the internet stream.

=== DAB Digital Radio ===
Visual radio applications are also possible over DAB Digital Radio. Using a technique called MOT Slideshow, visuals can be broadcast within the same data spectrum as the audio. Slideshow-enabled stations are already operating in some parts of the world, including Singapore, where they market this as visual radio.

=== RadioVIS ===
RadioVIS utilises the RadioDNS framework which provides a method to translate the broadcast parameters to an IP-based resource. The visuals which accompany the radio service are delivered independently over IP.

=== BORA ===
BORA or Korean : 보이는 라디오 is an internet radio service in South Korea and the Philippines. the service enables the listener to not only listen to the radio program but also see the DJs's of the radio program and if possible, even the guests of the show. the BORA streams can be accessed via the station's internet radio app or via a web browser. the stations that do this are: in the Philippines Magic 89.9, DWRX and ABS-CBN, and in Korea HLKV-AM, HLKV-FM, HLSQ-FM, HLSQ, Gyeonggi FM and Sunny FM which requires login and/or download the station's internet radio app meanwhile the Korean Broadcasting System's Popular music station KBS Cool FM's BORA stream can be accessible by both registered and non-registered KBS website users via this link.

=== Radio on Television (TeleRadyo) ===
Radio on Television, also known as TeleRadyo, is a format used by radio stations in the Philippines, mostly those which air a news and talk format. ABS-CBN introduced this format with the launch of DZMM TeleRadyo (was known as TeleRadyo Serbisyo from 2023 until 2025) in 2007. Other stations, especially those on the FM band, would follow suit. Other channels include DZRH News Television (DZRH 666), Radyo Pilipinas 1 Television (DZRB 738 AM), Aliw Channel 23 (DWIZ 882), Radyo Bandido TV (DZRJ 810), One PH (105.9 True FM) and DZME TeleRadyo (DZME 1530).
