= Nokia SU-33W =

Television receiver for Nokia mobile phones

Nokia SU-33W is a Nokia's Mobile TV Receiver. It allowed a limited number of Nokia phones to receive DVB-H broadcasts, which could be viewed using the Mobile TV application.

This functionality is integrated into the Nokia N92, Nokia N77, Nokia N96 and the Nokia 5330 Mobile TV Edition.

A 1seg version of this is also available in some South American and Asian countries and sold as SU-33Wb (using the SBTVD standard).

== Compatible Nokia phones ==
- Nokia 5230
- Nokia 5235
- Nokia 5530 XpressMusic
- Nokia 5800 XpressMusic
- Nokia 6220 classic
- Nokia E6
- Nokia E75
- Nokia N73
- Nokia N79
- Nokia N8
- Nokia N85
- Nokia N86 8MP
- Nokia N97
- Nokia N97 mini
- Nokia X6
