= Nokia N77 =

Mobile phone model

- Manufacturer: Nokia
- Availability by region: 2007
- Predecessor: Nokia N72
- Successor: Nokia N78
- Related: Nokia N73; Nokia N75; Nokia N76; Nokia N81; Nokia N82; Nokia N93; Nokia N93i; Nokia N95
- Form factor: Candybar
- Weight: 114 g (4 oz)
- Operating system: Symbian OS v9.1, S60 3rd Edition
- CPU: Freescale 220 MHz
- Memory: 20 MB
- Removable storage: microSD
- Rear camera: 2.0 megapixel, LED flash
- Front camera: CIF Video Call Camera
- Display: 240 x 320 pixels, 2.4", 16M Colors
- Connectivity: Bluetooth, Micro USB, SMS, MMS, Wi-Fi
- Data inputs: Keypad

The Nokia N77 is a 3G mobile phone from Nokia, introduced on 12 February 2007 and released in June 2007. It runs on Symbian 9.1 (S60 3rd Edition). The N77's specs were somewhat basic compared with most Nseries devices at the time, but it included a DVB-H television tuner. As stated in Nokia's press release, the N77 was designed as a low-cost mobile TV to accelerate DVB-H adoption. Sporting a candybar design similar to the N73, it was the company's second DVB-H device after the N92, though it did have a smaller screen. The N77 was thus only available in limited DVB-H markets and are now hard to come by.

== See also ==
- Nokia 7710
- Nokia N92
- Nokia N96
- Nokia 5330 Mobile TV Edition
- Nokia N8
- List of Nokia products
