= Nokia 5330 Mobile TV Edition =

Mobile phone model

- Manufacturer: Nokia
- Availability by region: 2009
- Successor: Nokia X3-00
- Related: XpressMusic
- Compatible networks: GSM, GPRS, EGPRS, WCDMA, A-GPS
- Form factor: Slider
- Dimensions: 101.2×48.5×14.25 mm (3.984×1.909×0.561 in)
- Weight: 114 g (4 oz)
- Operating system: Series 40 platform 6th Edition
- Memory: 128 MB SDRAM
- Removable storage: max. 16 GB microSD
- Battery: BL-4U (3.7V 1000mAh)
- Rear camera: 3.2 Megapixels, with flash
- Display: LCD QVGA 240 × 320 pixels, 2.4 inch (16.7 million colors)
- Connectivity: Bluetooth 2.1 +EDR, MicroUSB; 3.5 mm headphone jack
- Data inputs: Keypad

Nokia 5330 Mobile TV Edition is a mobile phone from Nokia, announced on 16 November 2009. It features a DVB-H television receiver, and has been Nokia's only non-smartphone to do so. Its design is based on that of the Nokia 5330 XpressMusic, announced nine month earlier in 2009.

== See also ==
- Nokia N92
- Nokia N77
- Nokia N96
- Nokia N8
- Nokia SU-33W (External Bluetooth DVB-H receiver)
