= Nokia N86 8MP =

High-end mobile phone released in 2009

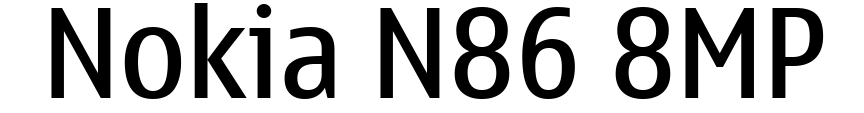

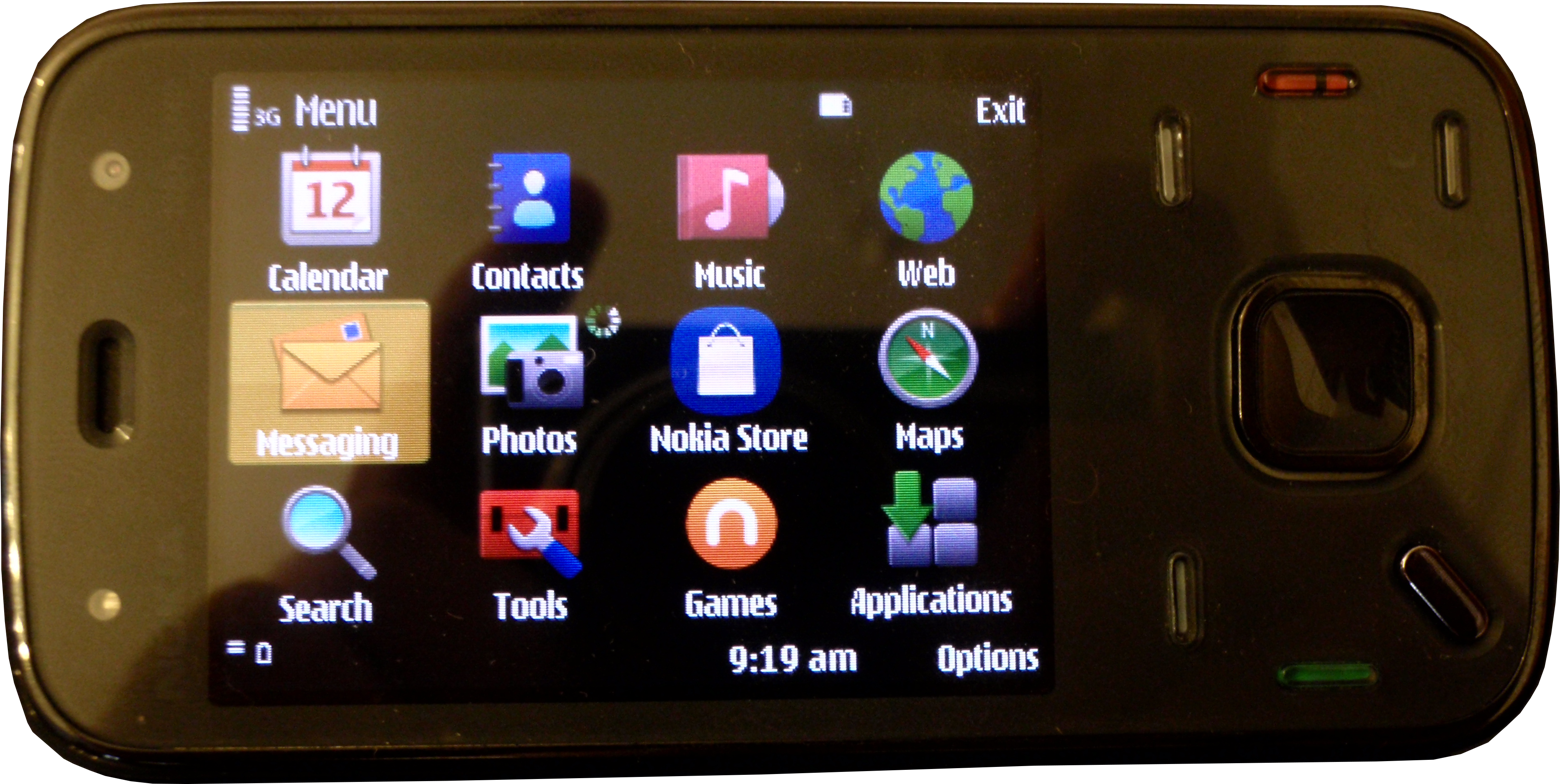
- Manufacturer: Nokia
- Availability by region: June 2009
- Predecessor: Nokia N82; Nokia N85; Nokia N95; Nokia N96
- Successor: Nokia 808 PureView; Nokia N97 Mini; Nokia N8; Nokia C7
- Related: Nokia N97; Nokia N79
- Compatible networks: HSDPA (3.5G) 900 / 1900 / 2100 (European) 850 / 1900 / 2100 (North American), quad band GSM / GPRS / EDGE GSM 850, GSM 900, GSM 1800, GSM 1900
- Form factor: Two-way slider
- Dimensions: 103.4×51.4×16.5 mm (4.07×2.02×0.65 in)
- Weight: 149 g (5 oz) (0.328 lb)
- Operating system: Symbian OS 9.3, S60 rel. 3.2 (v30.009)
- CPU: ARM 11 434 MHz processor
- Memory: 77 MB internal memory; 8 GB mass memory
- Removable storage: MicroSD, up to 16 GB supported with microSDHC support
- Battery: Removable Li-Ion 1200 mAh 3.7V (BL-5K)
- Rear camera: 8 megapixels (main) with 28 mm wide camera lens, 480p video recorder
- Front camera: VGA videocall (front)
- Display: 240 × 320 px, 2.6 in, Active Matrix OLED technology
- Connectivity: USB 2.0 via MicroUSB, Bluetooth 2.0, Wi-Fi 802.11 b/g, FM transmitter, Tv-out
- Data inputs: Keypad

The Nokia N86 8MP is a high-end mobile phone with emphasis on the camera and a two-way sliding body. It was announced on 15 February 2009 and released in June 2009 as part of the Nseries. It runs on Symbian OS 9.3 (S60 3rd Edition FP2) and shares similar design features with the N97. Its name references the camera's megapixel count.

== Camera ==
One of its main selling points is its Carl Zeiss photography features. It was Nokia's first camera phone to have an 8 megapixel sensor (although late compared to other manufacturers), and features both multiple aperture settings and a mechanical shutter (uncommon features by the standards of camera phones), and a Carl Zeiss lens with a wide angle of view (28 mm equivalent). It also has auto focus and a dual LED flash (3rd generation dual-LEDs), and an AF assist light. Video capture resolution is 640 × 480 pixels (VGA) at 30 frames per second.

The N86 is the second known mobile phone to feature a variable-aperture camera, following the Motorola Zine ZN5. The variable aperture adjusts between the three levels of f/2.4, f/3.2 and f/4.8, depending on lighting conditions.

== Design ==
The N86 utilises the dual-sliding form factor of the Nokia N95 and N85, whilst adding a toughened glass front cover and metal detailing and keypad, providing a premium look and feel. Sliding the screen up reveals the keypad while sliding it down reveals multimedia control buttons which are intended for horizontal multimedia viewing. It has a 2.6-inch AMOLED display, a fast 434 MHz processor, and 8GB of internal memory.

The Nokia N86 also features the same kickstand as the N85, and so it is possible to use as a small standalone screen, as well as configuring the opening of the stand to launch applications such as the video player. It also supports the N-Gage gaming platform. The N86 8MP is regarded as the spiritual successor of the N95 8GB due to its feature set in the same sliding form factor, and the commercial failure of the N96. Some regard it a successor of the N82 due to its camera.

== Features ==
The N86 8MP is a 3.5G or 3.75G(3GPP)device with dual-band HSDPA support, quad-band GSM and Wi-Fi. It has an A-GPS receiver, which links into location-based services via Nokia Maps, and photographs can be automatically geo-tagged. There is also a built-in digital compass, an FM radio, and there is also an FM transmitter. It is rated to give 6 hours talktime, 25 hours music playback and 11 days on standby on a full charge.

== Digital TV ==
With optional DVB-H Nokia Mobile TV Receiver SU-33W it is possible to watch television on the screen of the phone.

== Free navigation ==
Ovi Maps 3.03, with free navigation, was released on 17 March 2010 for the Nokia N86. The new version was available via the SW Update application and has a file size of 8.24 MB. The N86, E72, E55, E52, 6730, 6710 (S60 3rd Edition Feature Pack 2) and all of Nokia's Symbian^1 (S60 5th Edition) devices experienced beta-testing and free navigation.

== Firmware updates ==
=== 6 July 2009 ===
The Nokia N86 8MP received a big firmware upgrade, to v11.043. That brought official Ovi Store compatibility (with Ovi web site shortcut and option to download the dedicated client), camera tweaks and the usual early firmware bug fixes and improvements.

=== 30 September 2009 ===
The Nokia N86 8MP received its v20 firmware upgrade a full week or so ahead of schedule. It was 8 MB large for an Over The Air (OTA) update.

Significant changes included improved still image and video quality, close-up focus, face detection (indicated by a yellow square), red-eye removal were added, and new focus point indication (shows where in the scene the camera is focusing).

=== 11 January 2010 ===
The Nokia N86 8MP got a minor update to the v21 firmware. Version 21.006 replaced v20.115 and was a maintenance release, improving performance further and fixing a number of minor bugs.

=== 15 April 2010 ===
Version 30.009 firmware mainly features the latest Ovi Maps client and is now available via Nokia Software Update (142 MB) and Over The Air (5085 KB).

It included the latest Ovi Maps 3.03 (with free navigation), the sharing of location via Facebook. RealPlayer interface is tweaked (no more d-pad problem while playing videos) and there were some usual minor fixes and improvements.

=== 20 May 2010 ===
It included the latest Ovi Maps 3.04. The new version added formal support for WiFi as a positioning method as part of an overhaul of the positioning functionality, plus significant performance improvements for search, zooming and map panning, a number of consumer-friendly UI tweaks, and the addition of Qype information to the places database.

== Gallery ==
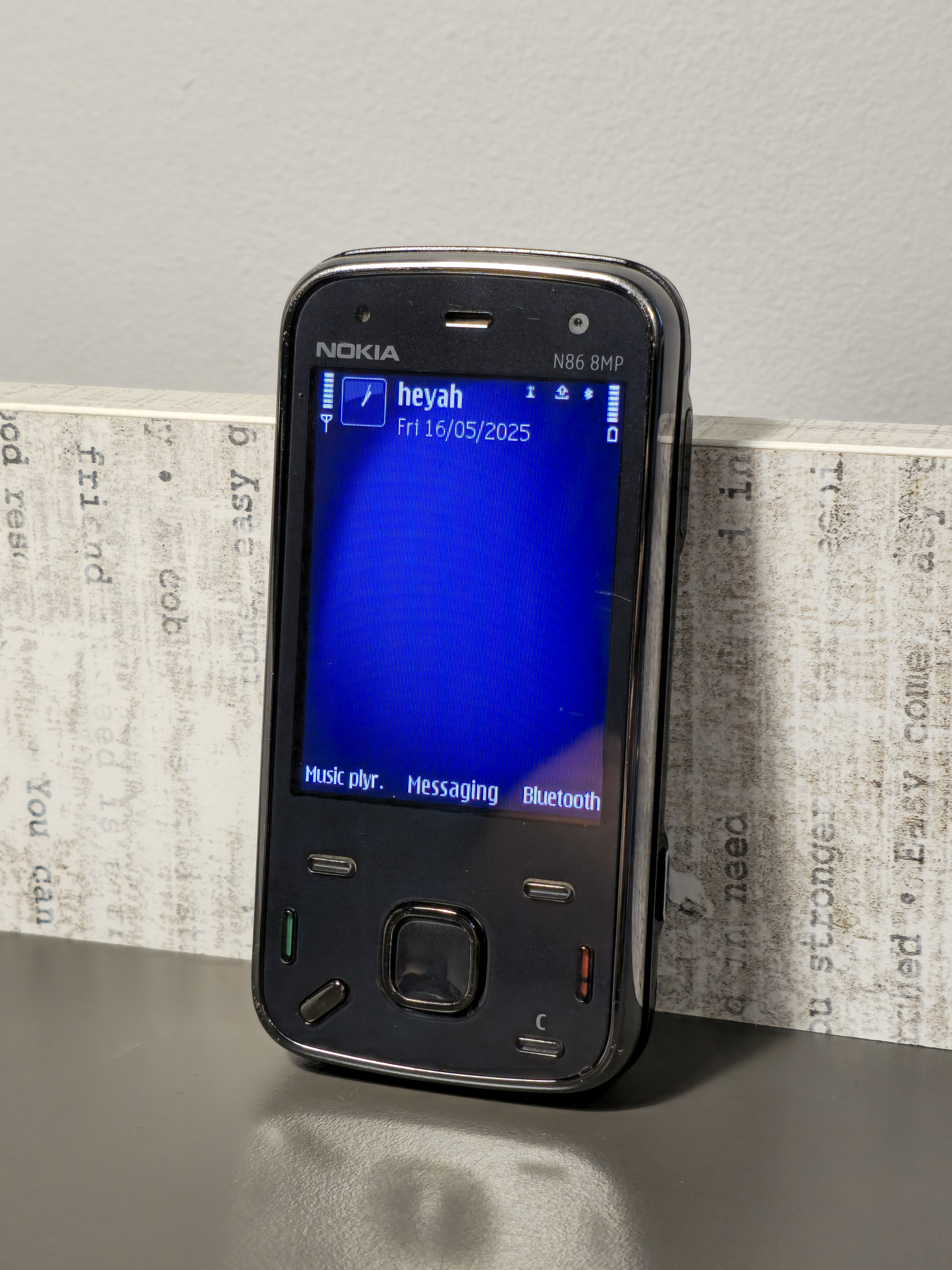
Front, closed

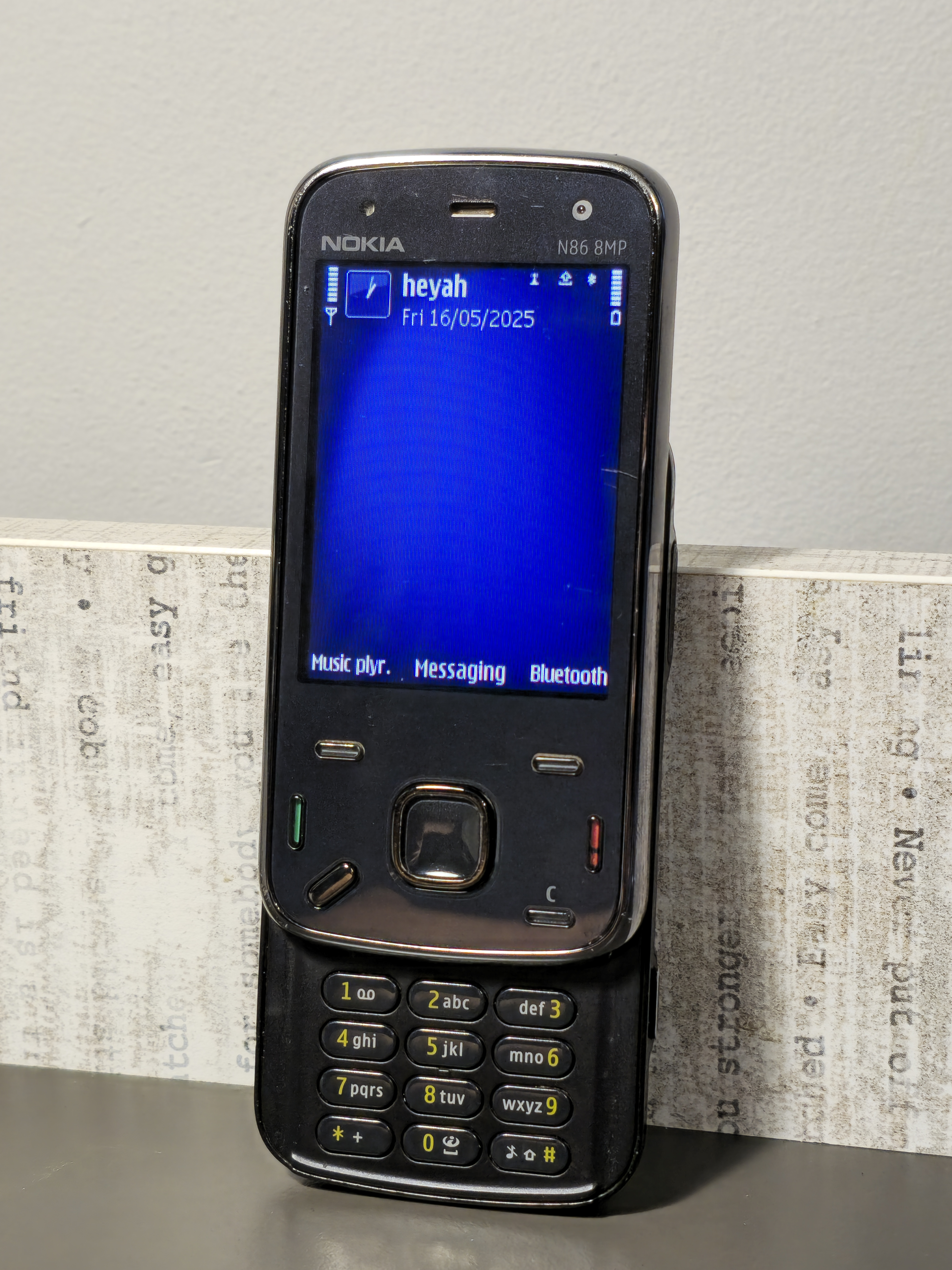
Front, open

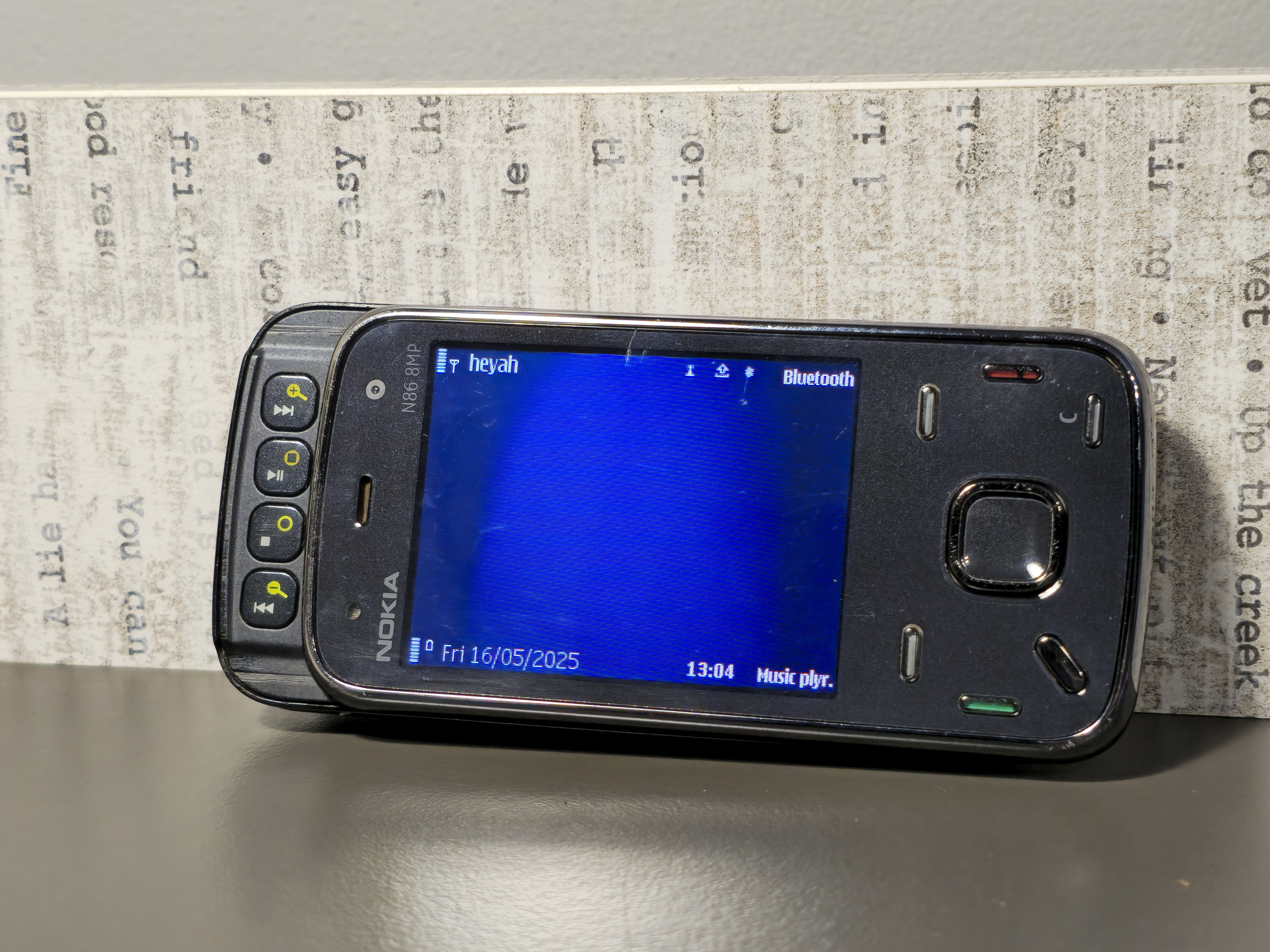
Front, media keys opened

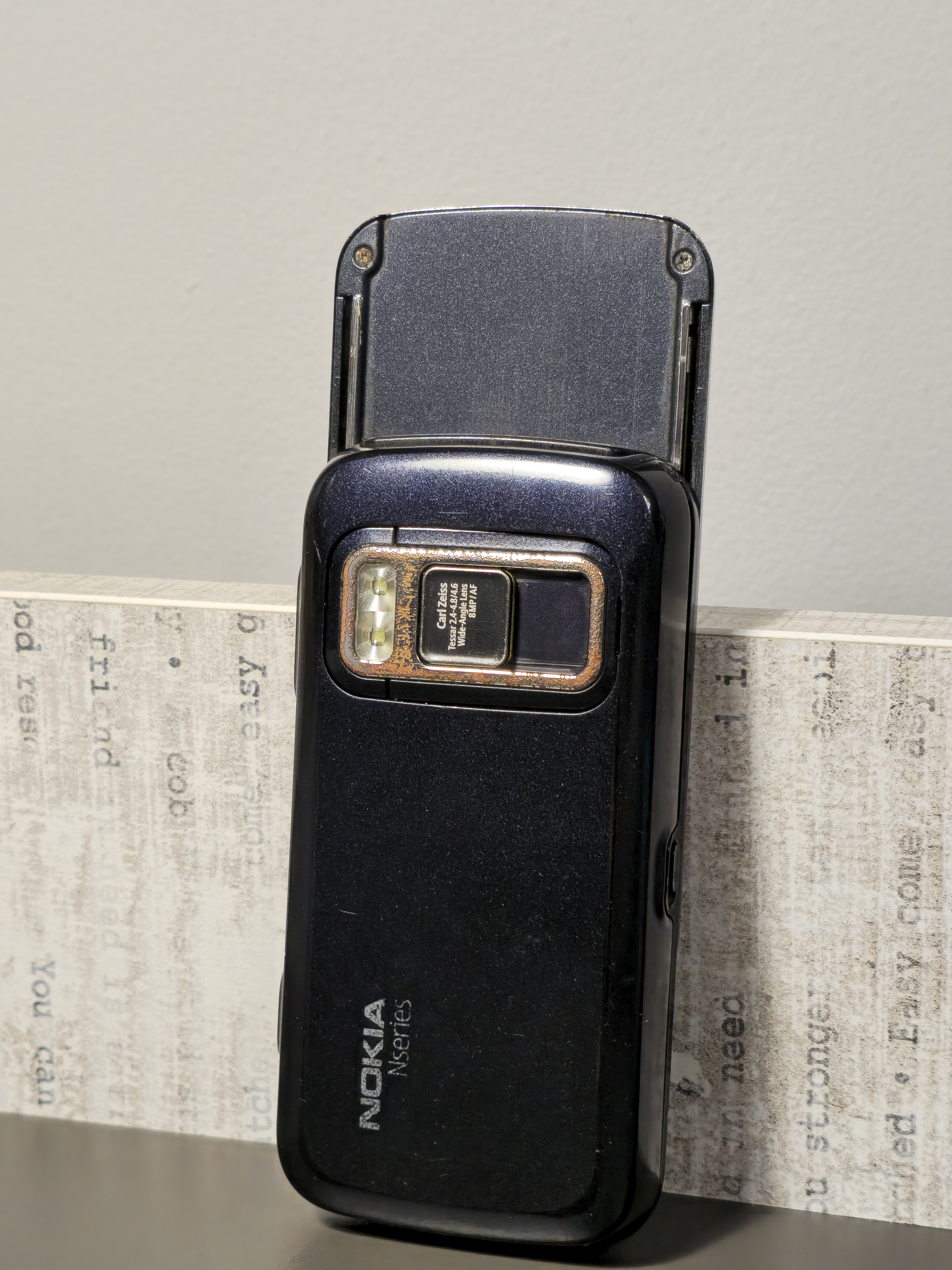
Back, open, camera slider closed

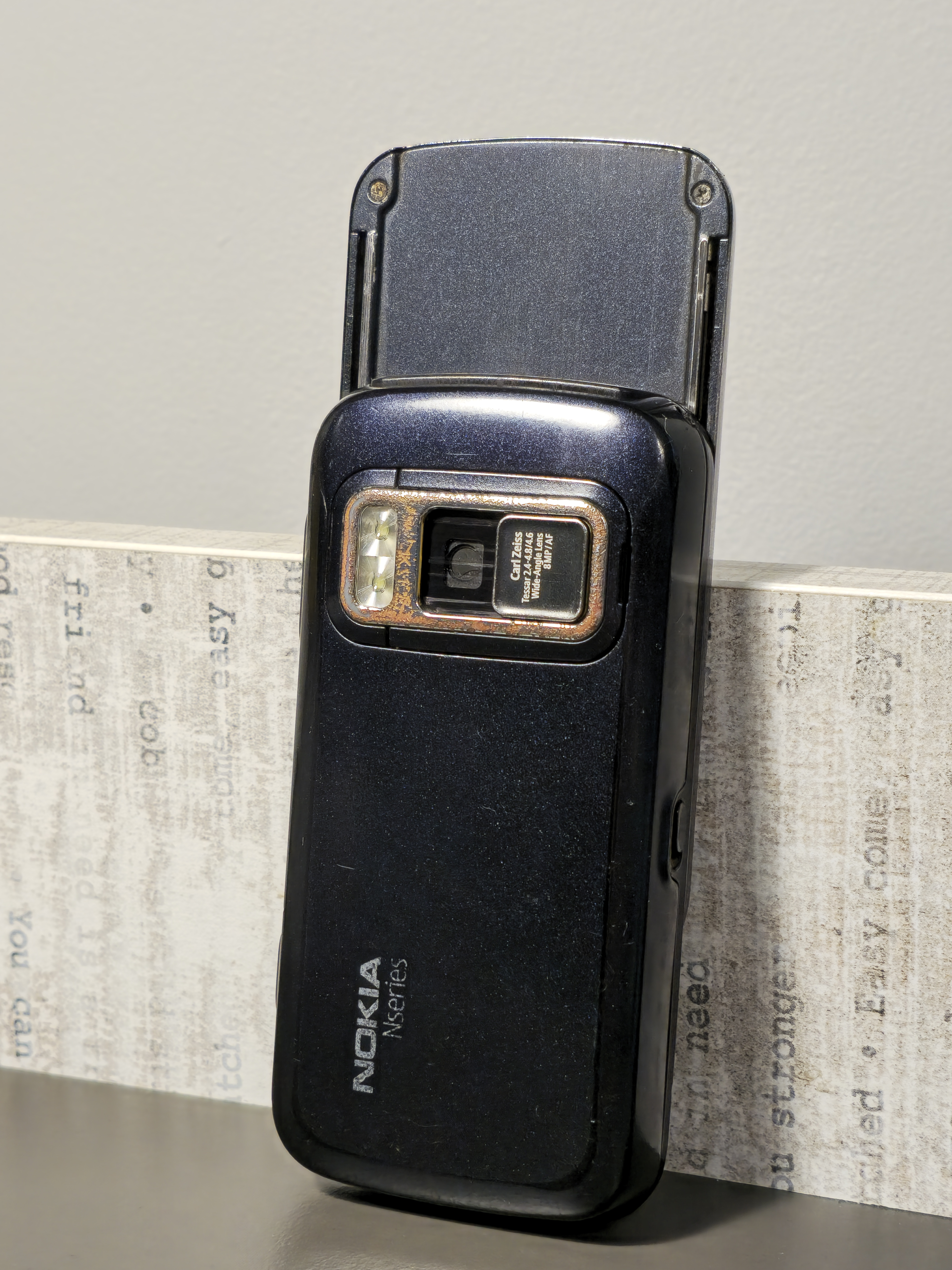
Back, open, camera slider open

== N87 ==
The Nokia N87, a successor of the N86, was leaked on the internet with full specifications in December 2009 and then again in early 2010. However it was never released, and instead the touchscreen Nokia N8 was introduced. In November 2010 a prototype of the N87 appeared on eBay which shows it running probably Symbian^3. The listing was removed after some time by the seller. Nokia would never release another high-end non-touchscreen device after the N86 8MP.
