= Nokia N82 =

2007 mobile phone model

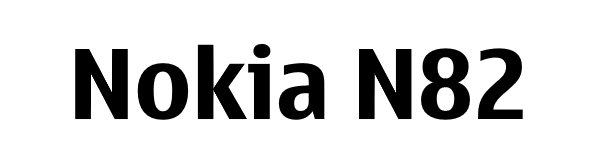

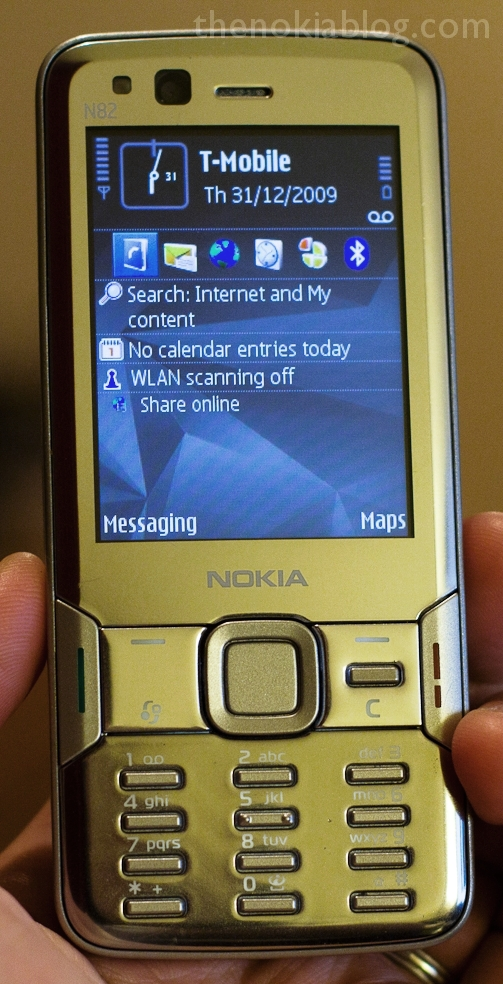
- Manufacturer: Nokia
- Availability by region: 14 October 2007; 28 November 2007 (Japan)
- Predecessor: Nokia N73; Nokia N93i
- Successor: Nokia N85; Nokia N86 8MP; Nokia N96
- Related: Nokia N78; Nokia N81; Nokia N95
- Compatible networks: GSM 850/900/1800/1900, UMTS 2100 with HSDPA (excluding China)
- Form factor: Candybar
- Dimensions: 112×50.2×17.3 mm (4.41×1.98×0.68 in)
- Weight: 114 g (4 oz)
- Operating system: Symbian OS v9.2, S60 3rd Edition Feature Pack 1
- Battery: Nokia battery (BP-6MT) 1050 mAh
- Rear camera: 5-MP / Carl Zeiss optics / Xenon flash (back)
- Front camera: CIF video call (front)
- Display: 2.4" QVGA LCD, 240 × 320 px, 16.7 million colors
- Connectivity: WLAN 802.11b/g (excluding China), Bluetooth, Micro-USB 2.0, Nokia 3.5 mm AV Connector, Hot swappable microSD

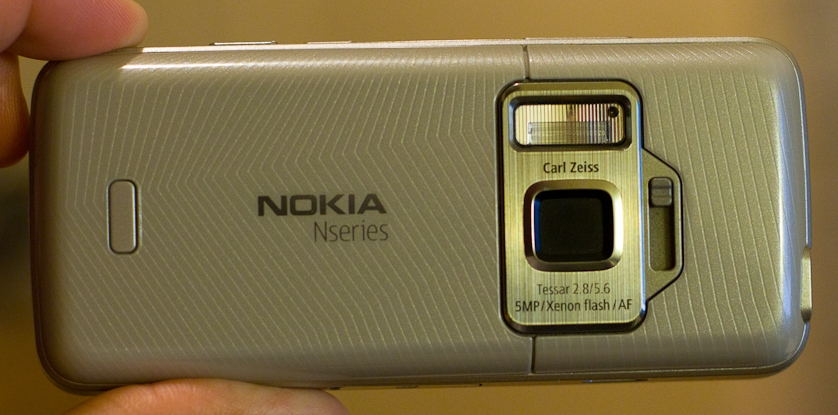
Nokia N82 rear view featuring a 5-megapixel camera with Carl Zeiss optics, sliding lens protector and a xenon flash.

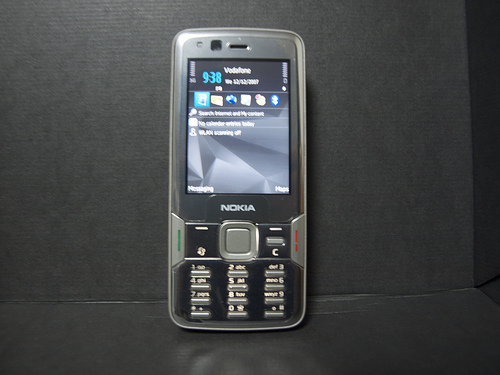
The N82 in silver

The Nokia N82 is a smartphone produced by Nokia, announced on 14 October 2007 as part of the company's Nseries line. The N82 runs Symbian OS v9.2 (S60 3rd Edition, FP1). The N82 inherits much of the Nokia N95's features and specifications (including GPS, Wi-Fi and HSDPA), with the major addition being its xenon flash. At the time the N82 was considered one of the most sophisticated camera phone on the market. It is also considered a successor to the Nokia N95, preceding the Nokia N96.

Like the N95 before it, the Nokia N82 was critically acclaimed and is often considered one of the best Symbian devices, although it did not sell as much and was not available worldwide. The N82 was Nokia's last high-end device in a candybar form, as its successors opted for sliders and later slate touchscreen form factors.

As a camera phone, the Nokia N82 primarily competed with Sony Ericsson K800/K810 and K850, while as a Symbian OS smartphone, its competitors include Sony Ericsson P1, Sony Ericsson W960, and Samsung G810.

== History ==
Nokia's N82 model was leaked in May 2007 (along with Nokia N81), but was not made official until six months later in November. It was introduced a month after the Nokia N95 8GB.

The latest firmware of the Nokia N82 is v35.0.002 released December 2009.

The N86 8MP from 2009 (a slider) is considered to be the N82's spiritual successor due to its high-end camera technology, despite the lack of Xenon flash. However a similar top-of-the-line device in a candybar form never appeared from Nokia after the N82. The Nokia 6220 classic of 2008 was the second Nokia with a Xenon flash. Xenon flash is later also featured in several Nokia camera-focused smartphones; Nokia N8 (2011), Nokia 808 PureView (2012), and Nokia Lumia 1020 (2013).

== Features ==
The N82 includes a built-in accelerometer for video stabilisation and photo orientation to keep landscape or portrait shots oriented as taken, and automatic 270 degree screen rotation. It is compatible with the N-Gage gaming platform. It has a 2.4-inch TFT display and features the same 332 MHz processor as found in the N95.

The N82 has almost identical specifications with the N95, leading to it being called by some as an "N95 in candybar form." Apart from the xenon camera flash addition, minor technologic differences between the models are: 128 MB RAM up from 64 MB (the N95's 8 GB variant also had 128 MB); CIF resolution (352x288) front camera up from QVGA (320 × 240); microUSB port rather than miniUSB; and removal of the infrared port.

=== Camera ===
The first Nokia phone with xenon flash, the N82 has a 5-megapixel camera with Carl Zeiss optics, and was considered the best camera phone on the market until the arrival of the Samsung GT-i8510.

Discussions and head-to-head comparisons of these two models demonstrate the N86 8MP from 2009, which is equipped with dual LED flash, is not consistently capable of outperforming the N82 in variable lighting. The primary advantage of using LED is light source for video recording, whereas the xenon flash has a stronger burst of light, but it cannot be used for recording videos due to its technical composition.

== Variants ==
The mainland China market version of the N82 has a different hardware platform which has Wi-Fi and the UMTS radio removed (no 3G support), has a different product code (RM-314 as opposed to RM-313) and its firmware is incompatible with the regular model's. This version can be readily identified by the lack of "WLAN scanning" display on the idle screen.

== Specifications ==
Feature	Specification
Form factor	Candybar
Colors	Gold/silver/black
Operating system	Symbian OS 9.2, S60 3rd Edition Feature Pack 1
Latest firmware	v35.0.002
GSM frequencies	850/900/1800/1900 MHz
GPRS	Yes (Class 32, 107 kbit/s)
EDGE (EGPRS)	Yes (Class 32, 296 kbit/s; DTM Class 11, 177 kbit/s)
WCDMA	Yes, 2100 MHz (excluding China)
Screen	240 × 320 pixels, diagonal 2.4", 16.7 million colors, auto-rotate
CPU	Dual 332 MHz ARM 11, Texas Instruments OMAP 2420
Graphics	PowerVR MBX 3D Graphics HW accelerator (OpenGL ES 1.1, DirectX 8.0 Compatible)
Internal dynamic memory (RAM)	128 MB
Internal flash memory	132.4 MB
Camera	5-megapixel CMOS camera sensor, xenon flash, auto-focus, Carl Zeiss optics, Tessar lens, front secondary camera for video call, CIF (352 × 288 pixels) sensor
Camera lens cover	Yes, acting as camera on/off switch and lens protector.
Video recording	Yes, MPEG-4 VGA (640x480), 30 fps
Multimedia Messaging	Yes
Video calls	Yes
Push to talk	Yes
Java support	Yes, Java MIDP 2.0, CLDC 1.1
Memory card slot	Yes, microSDHC, up to 32 GB
Bluetooth	Yes, 2.0
WLAN	Yes, IEEE 802.11 b/g with UPnP support
Infrared	No
Data cable support	Yes, USB 2.0 via micro-USB interface with USB mass storage support
Integrated speakers	Yes, stereo
TV out	Yes
HF speakerphone	Yes, with 3.5 mm headphones audio jack and A2DP wireless stereo headphone support
Battery	Li-ion 1050 mAh (BP-6MT)
Talk time	Up to 190 min (WCDMA), up to 260 min (GSM)
Standby time	Up to 210 hours (WCDMA), up to 225 hours (GSM)
Weight	114 g
Dimensions	112 × 50.2 × 17.3 mm
Navigation	Integrated GPS, A-GPS, Nokia Maps 2.0, Ovi Maps 3.0 (since 01.12.2008). External Bluetooth GPS receiver support
Browser	Web Browser for S60
Email	Yes, POP3/IMAP
Music player	Yes
Radio	Yes, Stereo FM radio with Visual Radio support.
Video playback formats	MPEG-4 Part 2 (DivX/XviD), MPEG-4 Part 10 (H.264), RealVideo up to RealVideo 10, with OMA DRM 2.0/1.0 & WMDRM support, Flash video (flv)
Audio playback formats	MP3, AAC/eAAC/eAAC+ (in .aac/.m4a files), WMA, playlists, OMA DRM 2.0/1.0 and WMDRM support

== See also ==
- Nseries
- Sony Ericsson K850i
- LG Viewty
- Samsung G800
- Nokia N78
