= Nokia N81 =

Mobile phone

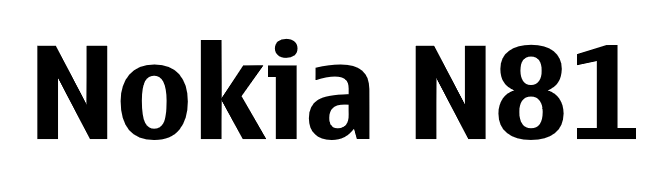

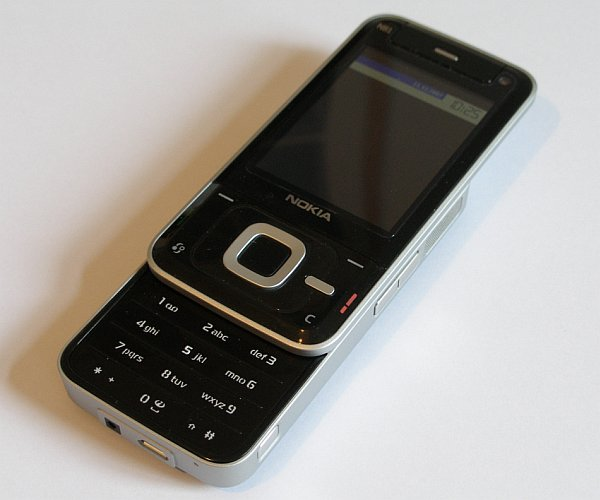
- Manufacturer: Nokia
- Availability by region: 2007
- Predecessor: Nokia 6111; Nokia 6290; Nokia N76; Nokia N80; Nokia N91
- Successor: Nokia N85; Nokia 5800 XpressMusic; Nokia N97 Mini; Nokia X6-00
- Related: Nokia N95 8GB; Nokia N78; Nokia N82; Nokia 6110 Navigator; Nokia N96
- Compatible networks: UMTS/GSM 850/900/1800/1900
- Form factor: Slider
- Dimensions: 102×50×17.9 mm (4.02×1.97×0.70 in), 86 cc
- Weight: 140 g (5 oz)
- Operating system: Symbian OS 9.2
- Battery: Li-Po 1050 mAh (BP-6MT)
- Rear camera: 2 MP / 1600 x 1200 px
- Front camera: CIF Video Call Camera
- Display: 240 x 320 pixels, 2.4", 16M Colors
- Data inputs: Keypad

The Nokia N81 and Nokia N81 8GB are mid-range Symbian OS mobile phones announced by Nokia in August 2007 and released the next month. It runs S60 3rd Edition, Feature Pack 1.

The N81, like the Nokia N73 Music Edition, was primarily marketed as an entertainment device focused on music, and it debuts the Nokia Music Store service. It was also heavily marketed as a mobile gaming device for its prominent inclusion of N-Gage services. It was the first device that came preloaded with the N-Gage 2.0 in 2008 (albeit in public beta), and features two dedicated gaming buttons that can be used for compatible N-Gage games; this would later also appear on the N96, N85 and 5730 XpressMusic. During the launch of N-Gage 2.0, the N81 was specifically chosen by Nokia in advertisements. It has stereo speakers. Several reviewers have claimed that the N81 has, much like the older Nokia N91, a very high sound output quality and therefore highly suitable for audiophiles.

The four-way silver-coloured D-pad below the display also contains a new capacitive sensor called the Navi wheel, which allows scrolling in the S60 gallery and music player applications by 'stroking' the key, in a similar manner to the iPod click wheel. It is a unique feature that rarely appears on mobile handsets. The Navi wheel would later also appear on other Nokia Nseries handsets: N78, N85 and N96.

Other than these, the N81 has more modest specifications compared to the Nokia N82, with a 2-megapixel camera, lacking both GPS and HSDPA, and weighing 20 grams heavier. However the N81 did have an ARM11 369 MHz processor, the fastest on a Nokia device at the time. The Nokia N81 notably features a sliding spring-loaded physical keylock on the top of the device, located next to the 3.5 mm jack. It is the first Nseries device that uses microUSB instead of miniUSB.

The N81 8GB features the titular 8 gigabytes of internal storage. This version retailed for 430 euros before taxes, 70 euros more than the standard version which requires a microSD memory card to expand its 12 megabytes of storage. N81 would be succeeded by the Nokia N85 in 2008.

== Reception ==
The Nokia N81 had a lower sound output compared to the N91 due to the release of the new firmware version. According to Nokia, they must follow an international standard wherein a device's initial or default volume must be set too low to cause any damage to its users.

CNET found it buggy, slow, and badly designed. S21 gave it 3/5, praising its feature set, while again criticising the "plasticky" design. However its musical capabilities have been highly praised.
