= Nokia Nseries =

Discontinued series of high-end phones by Nokia

- Manufacturer: Nokia
- Series: Nseries
- Availability by region: 2005–2011
- Related: Nokia Lumia
- Compatible networks: GSM, EDGE, UMTS, HSPA
- Operating system: Symbian, Maemo, MeeGo/Harmattan
- Removable storage: MicroSD
- Rear camera: 2.0–12.0 MP
- Front camera: 0.3 MP / VGA / Common Intermediate Format-5 MP
- Connectivity: WLAN
- Development status: Discontinued

The Nokia Nseries was a high-end lineup of feature phones, smartphones, and tablets marketed by Nokia Corporation from 2005 to 2011. The Nseries devices commonly supported multiple high-speed wireless technologies at the time, such as 3G, or Wireless LAN. Digital multimedia services, such as music playback, photo/video capture or viewing, gaming or internet services were the central focus of the lineup. The lineup was replaced in 2011 by the Nokia Lumia line as the company's primary smartphone lineup.

The Nokia N1 tablet was introduced in November 2014 and so revived the 'N' prefix, but it was not marketed as 'Nseries'.

== History ==
On 27 April 2005, Nokia announced a new brand of multimedia devices at the press conference of mobile phone manufacturers in Amsterdam. The first three Nseries devices introduced at the conference consists of N70, N90 and N91. On 2 November 2005, Nokia announced the N71, N80 and N92, and on 25 April 2006, Nokia announced the N72, N73 and N93, and on 26 September 2006, Nokia announced the N75 and N95. On 8 January 2007, Nokia announced the Nokia N76, Nokia N77 and Nokia N93i. On 29 August 2007, Nokia announced the N95 8GB, N81, N81 8GB, and on 14 November 2007, Nokia announced the N82, the first Nokia with xenon flash. At the 2008 GSMA held in Barcelona, the N96 and N78 were unveiled. Two new Nseries devices were revealed at the end of August 2008, the Nokia N79 and Nokia N85. On 2 December 2008, Nokia Nseries announced the Nokia N97. On 17 February 2009, Nokia announced the Nokia N86 8MP, which is Nokia's first 8-megapixel phone. The Nokia N8 with 12-megapixel camera was announced in April 2010 and on 21 June 2011 Nokia showcased their Nokia N9 smartphone based on the MeeGo OS, their fourth non-Symbian Nseries device (after the Maemo OS-based N800 and N810 Internet tablets, and N900 smartphone). The Nseries was retired and replaced by Lumia that year. The company introduced the Nokia N1 tablet on 18 November 2014, which marked the return of the N prefix, but 'Nseries' branding has still been absent.

== Features ==
The Nokia Nseries is aimed at users looking to pack as many features as possible into one device. The better-than-average cameras often found on Nseries devices (with many using the higher-quality Carl Zeiss optics) are one such example, as are the video and music playback and photo viewing capabilities of these devices, which resemble those of standalone portable media devices. As of 2008, in all recently launched devices GPS, MP3 player and WLAN functionality also have been present.

The numbers describe the traits of the phone:

- N7x - 7 series is the balanced, least expensive Nseries range with fewer features
- N8x - 8 series is the higher range Nseries range w/ cameras (ex. N82, N85 and N86 8MP)
- N9x - 9 series is the highest end and the most expensive Nseries range, considered the flagship devices

There are exceptions though - considering N8x, both the N82 and N86 8MP were top-of-the-range smartphones with advanced cameras, so are clearly 'high-end' as their fellow N9x models.

== Operating systems ==
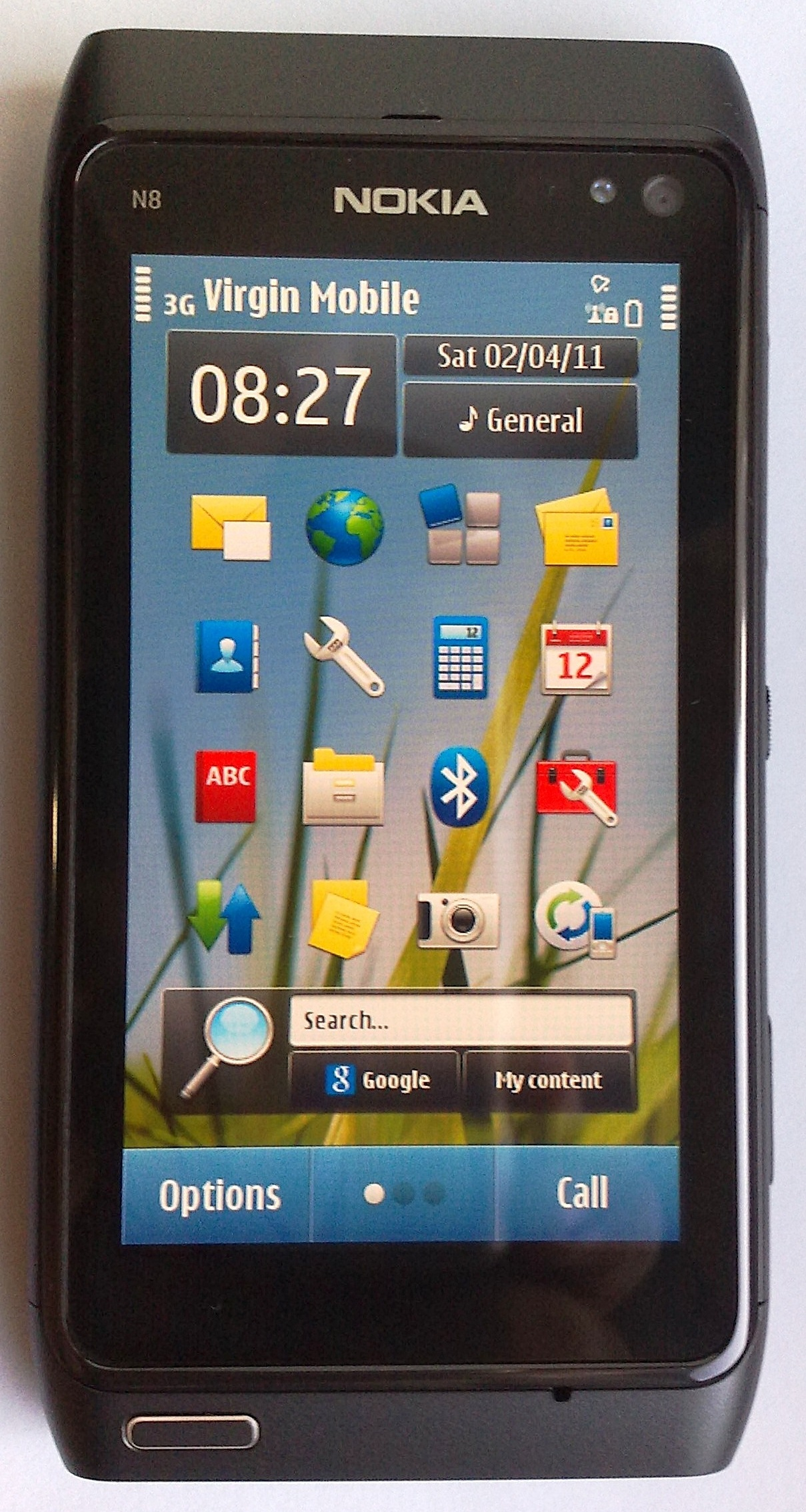
The Nokia N8 smartphone was the world's first Symbian^3 device, and the first camera phone by Nokia to feature a 12-megapixel autofocus lens.

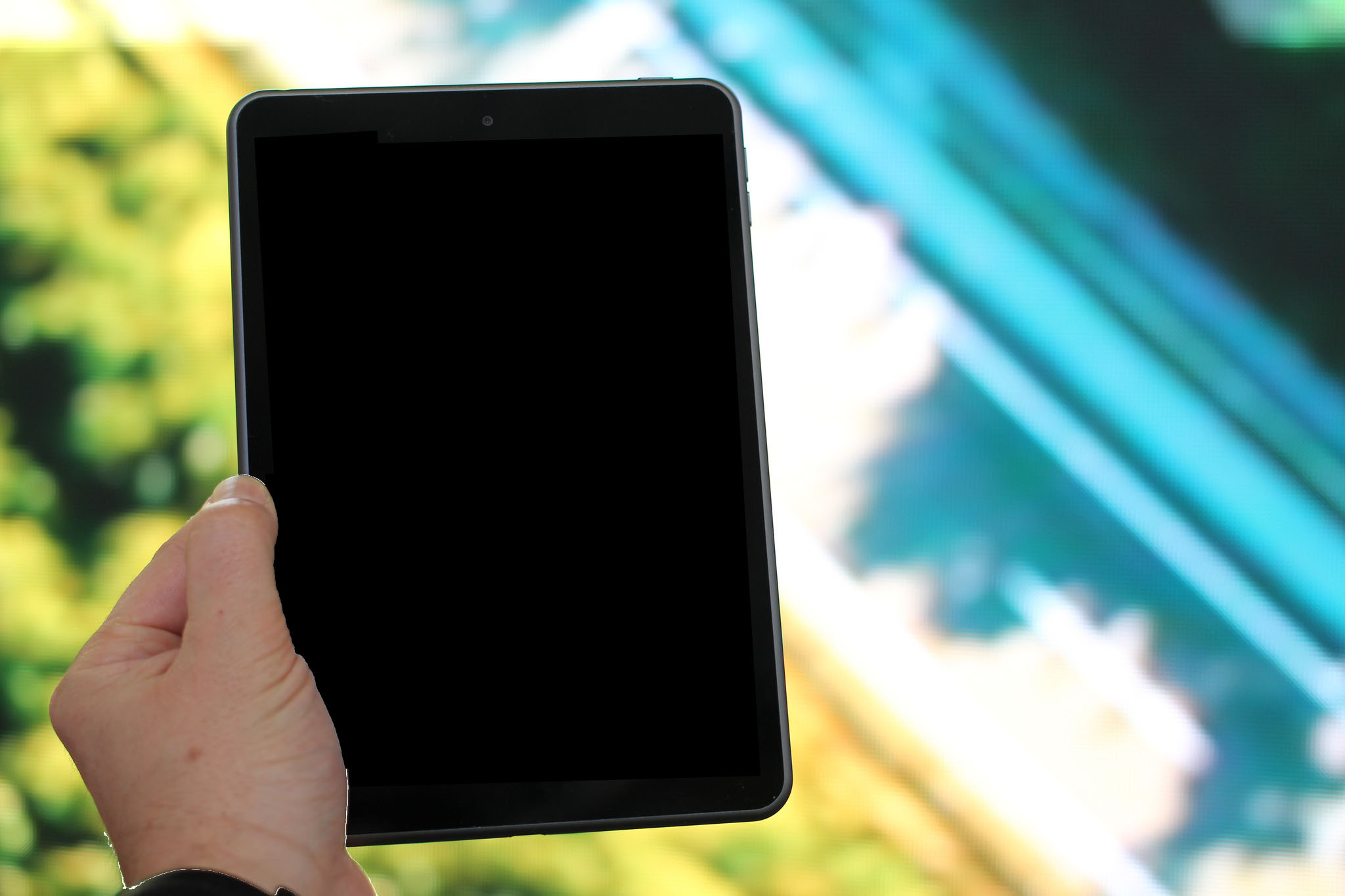
The Nokia N1 tablet was Nokia's latest Nseries smartphone/tablet that uses 7.9 inches IPS LCD screen.

The first Nseries device was the Nokia N90 in 2005, which ran the Symbian OS 8.1 mobile operating system with Series 60 2nd Edition Feature Pack 3, as did the simultaneously announced Nokia N70.

The Nokia N8, released in September 2010, was the world's first phone to run Symbian^3, and the first phone by Nokia featuring a 12-megapixel autofocus lens.

On the Nokia N800 and Nokia N810 Internet tablets (2007), and Nokia N900 smartphone (2009), Nokia chose to use the Linux-based Maemo operating system.

The last Nseries mobile phones were the Nokia N9 and developer-only Nokia N950, released in September 2011. Maemo had merged with Intel's Moblin to create MeeGo in May 2010, so Nokia opted to use MeeGo "Harmattan" 1.2 for these devices.

The Android-powered Nseries tablet Nokia N1 developed by Nokia, released in January 2015, uses Android (operating system) 5.0 (Lollipop). It is manufactured by Foxconn and has 8-megapixel back camera and 5-megapixel front camera.

== List of Nseries devices ==
In June 2011 at the Nokia Connections in Singapore, Nokia launched the new N9 with MeeGo 1.2 Harmattan OS which the company calls Qt device as the whole app and UI framework is written in Qt. It is also the world's first pure touch phone with no buttons for home screen and a great new swipe UI. Reviews have been average to good for this phone, with most reviewers liking the phone's good quality and operating system, but expressing concern over the fact that it loses out to competitors in terms of specs. The device was expected to be sold in selected regions in Q3 2011.

== See also ==
- Nokia Cseries
- Nokia Eseries
- Nokia Xseries
- List of Nokia products
- HMD global § Smartphones
