= Nokia N73 =

Mobile phone model

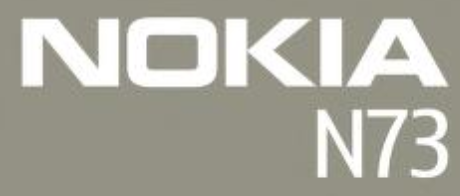

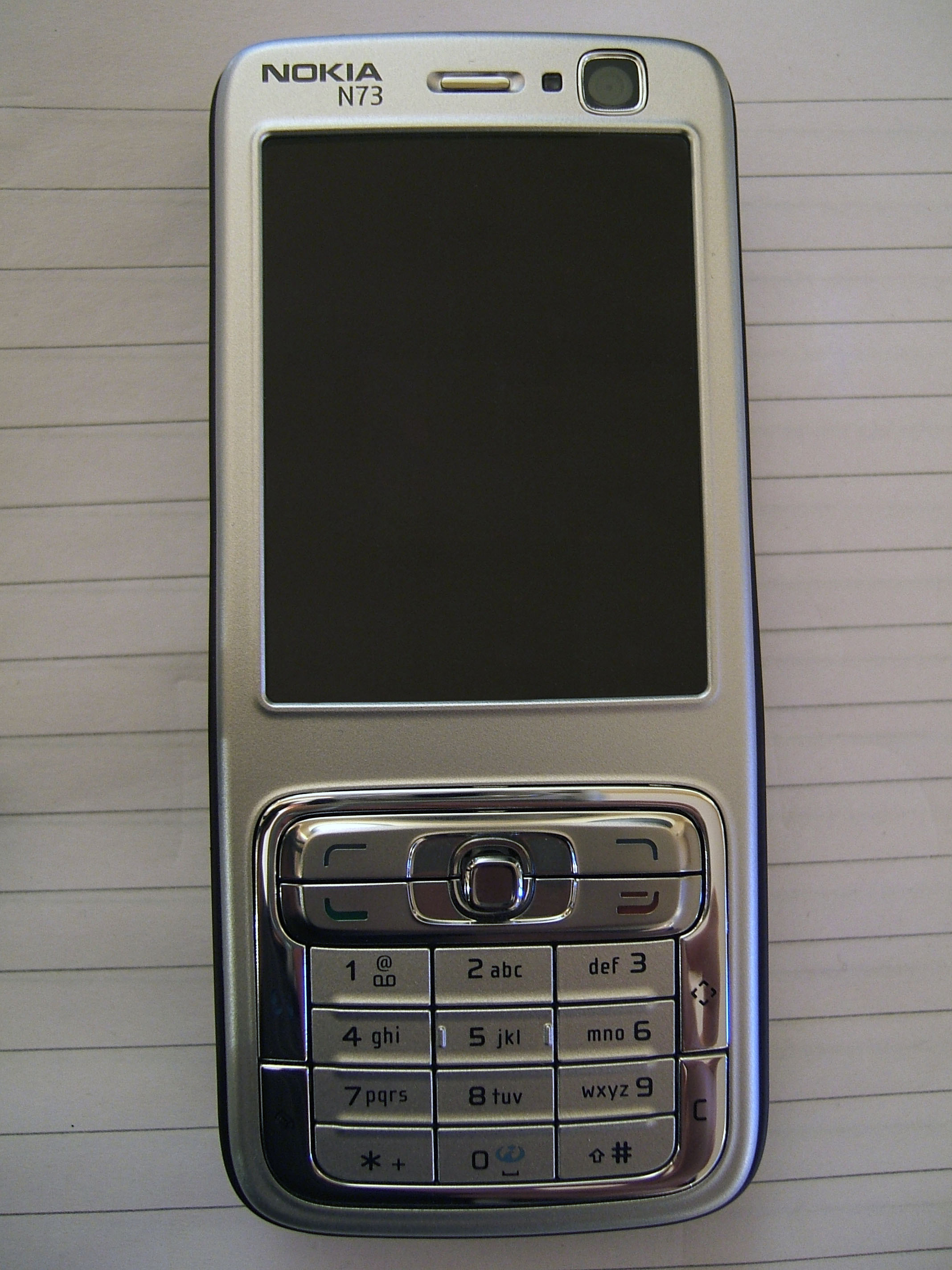
- Manufacturer: Nokia
- Series: Nokia Nseries
- First released: 25 April 2006; 20 years ago
- Availability by region: May 2006 (Original) and January 2007 (Music Edition)
- Discontinued: Q1 2011
- Predecessor: Nokia N70; Nokia N71; Nokia N72; Nokia N90; Nokia N91
- Successor: Nokia N77; Nokia N78; Nokia N92; Nokia N93/Nokia N93i
- Related: Nokia N75; Nokia N76; Nokia N77; Nokia N93; Nokia N93i; Nokia N95
- Compatible networks: GSM quad-band UMTS 2100
- Form factor: Candybar
- Dimensions: 110×49×19 mm (4.33×1.93×0.75 in)
- Weight: 116 g (4 oz)
- Operating system: Symbian OS v9.1 + S60 3rd Edition
- CPU: Dual CPU ARM9 220 MHz
- Memory: 64 MB
- Storage: 42 MB (Nokia N73); 40 MB (Nokia N73 Music Edition)
- Removable storage: miniSD up to 2 GB (up to 4 GB unofficial)
- Battery: BP-6M Battery, Li-Ion, 3.7 V, 900 mAh; 1100 mAh (Music Edition)
- Rear camera: 3.15 megapixels (Carl Zeiss Tessar lens, flash, red-eye reduction, autofocus, 20x digital zoom)
- Front camera: VGA camera (640 × 480 pixels) with up to 2× digital zoom
- Display: 2.4-inch QVGA, TFT, 262,144 colours, 240 × 320 pixels
- Connectivity: 3G; EDGE; UMTS; Bluetooth 2.0 + EDR; Infrared
- Data inputs: Keypad

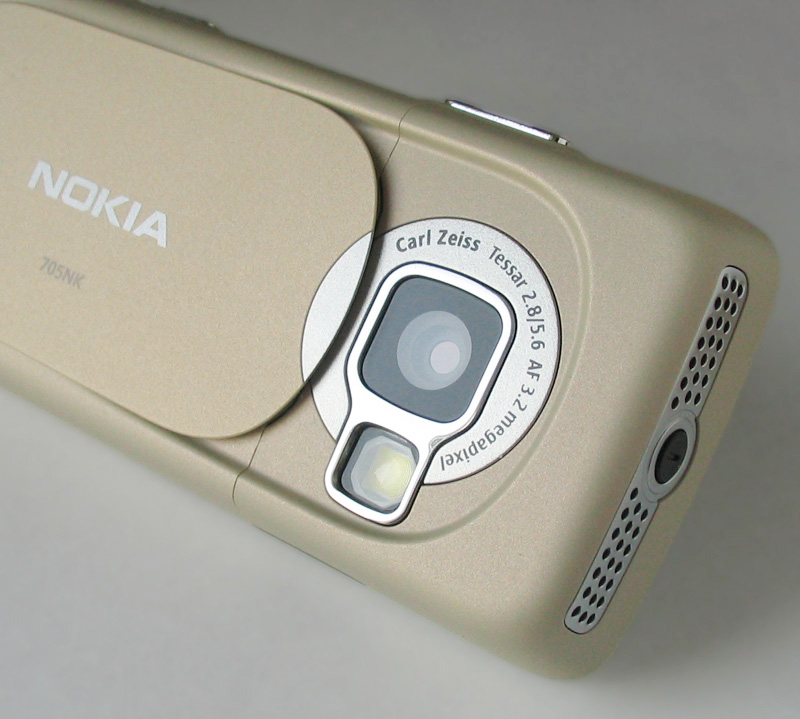
N73 back side with open camera lens

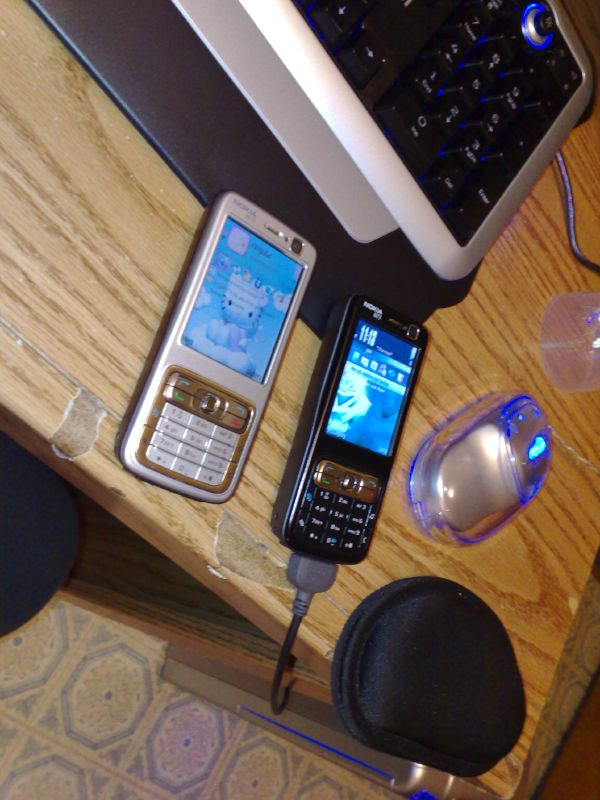
N73 2006 (left) and Music Edition 2007 (right)

The Nokia N73 is a mobile phone announced by Nokia in 2006 as part of the N series and started shipping on 15 July. The N73 succeeded the N70 and packed in numerous multimedia features. It features a 3.2 megapixel autofocus camera, a front camera, a then-large 2.4-inch display, and stereo speakers, all in a relatively slim and pocketable size and form. It runs on Symbian v9.1 (S60 3rd Edition). An improved, music-focused version called N73 Music Edition was released in 2007.

It became one of the top-selling N series devices during 2006 and 2007, and its high popularity helped Nokia's sales of 'multimedia' phones grow 28% year-on-year in Q3 2007 (according to Nokia the other top-selling from the line were the N70 and N95).

== Software ==
In common with other Nokia 'Nseries' and 'Eseries' phones of its time (late 2006), the N73 comes loaded with many software applications, including contacts, messaging, picture and video galleries, a music player, a Visual FM Radio, RealPlayer, an IM client, a WAP browser, a full web browser based on KHTML/WebKit, a Microsoft Office document viewer, a PDF viewer, an Adobe Flash Lite viewer and some games.

The majority of these applications support background execution; for example, one may listen to music while browsing the Internet, and then may switch to write a text message or e-mail, without having to close any applications. Except for the newer Sony Ericsson phones like K550 and W610, feature phones typically cannot do this or can do it in only a very limited way; for example, only the music player can run in the background.

Java applications as well as Symbian (S60 release 3) applications can be installed to or removed from the phone by the user, using either the Nokia PC Suite software, which is included with the phone, or the installer application on the phone itself.

The N73 uses a database system for the supplied 'Gallery' applications (which permanently run in the background, in order to reduce seek and operation times) and again these databases can be updated locally on the device itself. This means that supported image, video, and audio files can be placed almost anywhere in the file system and browsed easily, and in the case of MP3 audio files, by ID3 tag (e.g. 'album', 'artist', etc.).

Notably, Nokia supports firmware upgrades to the N73 to be made by the user via a module in Nokia PC Suite or directly over-the-air.

== Variants ==
Besides the original edition, Nokia released three other variants of N73.

=== Music Edition ===
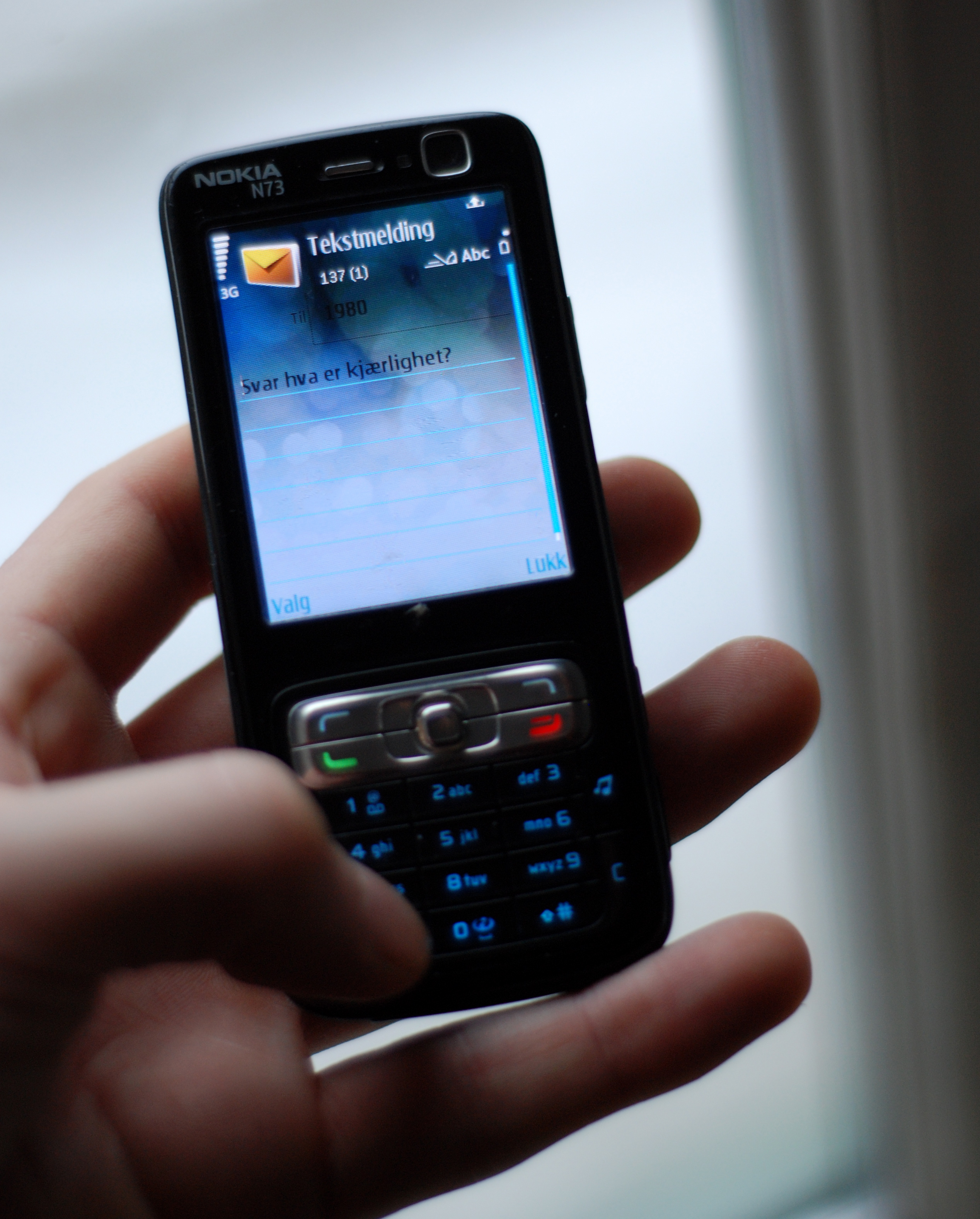
Nokia N73 Music Edition

In addition to the basic N73, Nokia subsequently released the N73 'Music Edition' in 2007. The 'multimedia button' on the keypad has been replaced with a button that starts the music player on the phone. The Music Edition also includes a 2 GB miniSD card and the phone is completely black. The music player on the Music Edition supports album art and visualisations, while the regular N73 does not. Except the regular N73 has been updated firmware V4.0850.43.0.1.

The Music Player application stays in the background at all time (even when music is not being played). In the later firmware versions this application can be terminated, but doing so prevents the Music Edition remote control from working, until the application is started again by using the phone's keypad.

=== Internet Edition ===
The 'N73 Internet Edition' was essentially the Music Edition, but retaining the 'multimedia button' function, rather than a dedicated 'music button'. The 'N73 Internet Edition' is not available in the Middle East and North Africa.

=== Special Edition ===
Nokia has also released another model of the N73 called the 'N73 Special Edition' in the Middle East and North Africa. The phone was released during the Muslim holy month of Ramadan in 2007. The phone has the same hardware as the other editions of the N73 but comes preloaded with Islamic applications and the phone is completely white.

Nokia also released an N73 Special Edition in Indonesia, without preloaded Islamic applications.

== Firmware ==
All three versions of the N73 appear to have been updated to the same software as each other. The update on 26 June 2007, updates the standard N73's Music Player to the same version as the Music Edition's enhanced Music Player detailed above, while keeping the 'multimedia button' function, essentially making it an Internet Edition.

In 2008, updates with the standard features with Nokia Maps Application installed by default (but requires an external Bluetooth GPS receiver), Nokia Lifeblog, PTT, and Search applications carried on from the previous updates, plus the addition is the Nokia Mobile TV application also installed by default (requires an external Nokia Mobile TV Receiver SU-33W) which is an application available on N77. The camera is much improved from earlier firmware. In this update, the phone takes 27 seconds to boot, compared to 42 or more in previous versions. Also, the N73 has 20 MB of RAM available after boot. A little change were users may not be able to install the N-Gage application, which is modified to work in N73. Making it better compared to Music Edition because of its multimedia keypad rather than having only a single usage button, same features of Music Player like ME that supports album art and visualisations, enhanced control interface and also available on start screen when menu key is pressed and hold after the phone boots up.

Also, during recent UK Nokia poster campaigns, the black (ME) version of the phone was advertised without the term 'Music Edition', and the O2 UK shop sells the N73 in both Silver/Plum and Black, with the Black version having the multimedia button rather than the music button.

== Specifications ==
| Feature | Specification |
|---|---|
| CPU | Dual CPU, CPU Type: ARM 9, CPU Clock Rate: 220 MHz |
| OS | S60 3rd Edition (initial release) |
| Memory | Max User Storage: 42 MB, NAND Memory: 128 MB, SDRAM Memory: 64 MB, ~14 MB Free Executable RAM Memory, Memory Card: Mini SD (Max 2 GB (4 GB Mini SD cards can be inserted, but lags will be possible)) |
| Video recording | Yes (Format: MPEG-4, 3GP. Maximum resolution: 352x288 pixels. 15fps.) |
| Browsing | Yes. Comes standard with a full Web browser |
| Multimedia Messaging | Yes |
| Voice calls | Yes |
| Video calls | Yes |
| Push to talk | Yes |
| Java support | Yes (MIDP 2.0, CLDC 1.1) |
| Bluetooth | 2.0 + EDR (A2DP -i.e. Support for stereo bluetooth headsets available with firmware version 4 or above) |
| Data cable support | Yes |
| E-mail | Yes |
| Other | Flash Lite 1.1 |
| Audio | Stereo speakers |
| Audio | Stereo headset |
| | Max internet connection speed 384 kbit/s |
| | Voice commands |
| | Mobile TV application (Requires an external Nokia Mobile TV Receiver SU-33W) |
| Colors | Silver and Plum; White and Pink; White and Red; White and white; Silver, Blue; White and Sand; Black (Music Edition 2007, available later as a standard color); Dark Brown (Music Edition 2007); White (Special Edition) |
