= Nokia 6136 =

Mobile phone model

Nokia 6136 is a mobile telephone handset produced by Nokia. It features Generic Access Network (GAN), a technology formerly known as Unlicensed Mobile Access (UMA).

== Technical specifications ==
- Quad band GSM / GPRS / EDGE: GSM 850/900/1800/1900
- Wi-Fi (IEEE 802.11b/g)
- Generic Access Network (automatic switching between WLAN and cellular networks)
- 1.3 megapixel camera
- USB (mini USB)
- IrDA
- microSD
- Stereo FM radio with Visual Radio
- Push to Talk over Cellular (PoC)
- Runs the Series 40 interface
