= Nokia N93i =

Smartphone model released in 2007

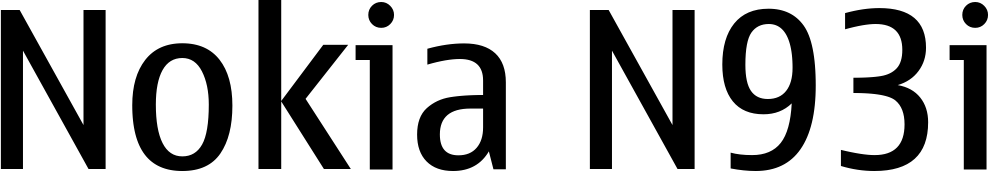

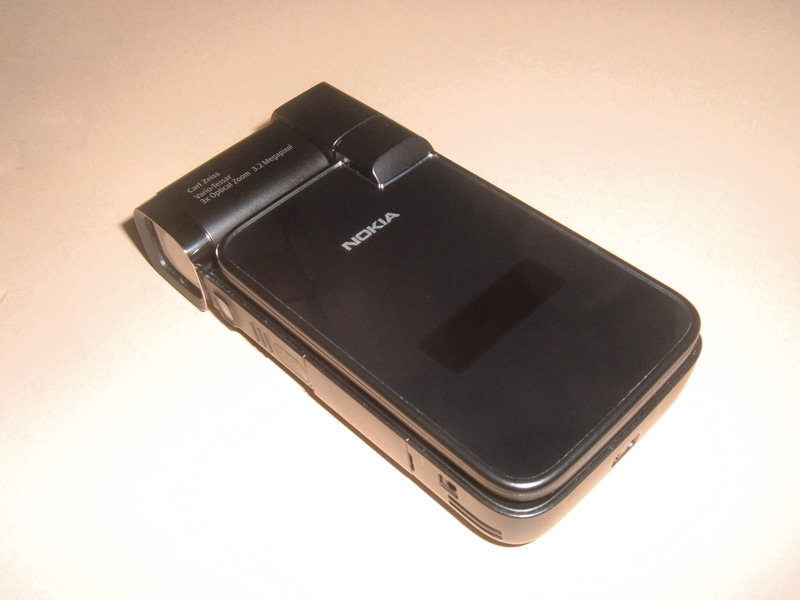
- Nokia N93i while folded/closed
- Manufacturer: Nokia
- Availability by region: January 2007
- Predecessor: Nokia N93
- Successor: Nokia N82 and Nokia N85
- Compatible networks: GSM / GPRS / EDGE, GSM 900, GSM 1800, GSM 1900, DTM, WCDMA 2100
- Form factor: Clamshell
- Dimensions: 108×58×25 mm (4.25×2.28×0.98 in), 115 cc
- Weight: 163 g (6 oz)
- Operating system: Symbian OS 9.1
- CPU: Dual Core Arm-11 332 MHz
- Memory: Up to 50 MB built-in memory
- Removable storage: Up to 2 GB with miniSD
- Battery: Li-Ion 950 mAh (BL-5F)
- Rear camera: 3.2 MP / 2048 x 1536 / 3x optical zoom / 20x digital zoom / LED flash / video recorder
- Front camera: 288 x 352 / 2x digital zoom
- Display: TFT, 16.7 million colors, 240x320 pixels
- External display: TFT, 65,536 colours, 128x36 pixels
- Connectivity: GPRS, HSCSD, EDGE, 3G, WLAN, Bluetooth, Infrared, USB

The Nokia N93i (model no. N93i-1) is a mobile phone produced by Nokia, announced on 8 January 2007 and released the same month. It is part of the Nseries line and is a redesigned successor of the Nokia N93. Like the N93, it is a clamshell and swivel design with a camera and landscape position. The N93i was the last Nokia device with the swivel form factor.

The N93i runs on Symbian OS version 9.1, with the S60 3rd Edition user interface. Compared to the N93, the N93i has a sleeker design, reduced size and weight, and a number of other refinements and improvements.

== Features ==
The Nokia N93i features a 3.2-megapixel camera, Carl Zeiss optics, 3x optical zoom and digital video stabilization. The ability to create "DVD-like videos" at 30 frames per second with MPEG4 technology and share them on the 2.4-inch display. The Nokia N93i can be connected to a compatible TV using direct TV out connectivity or via Wireless LAN and UPnP technology. The N93i also features a digital stereo microphone, music player and FM stereo radio, dual mode WCDMA/GSM and triband GSM coverage on up to five continents (EDGE/GSM 900/1800/1900 + WCDMA 2100 MHz networks).

It also has a 16 million colours LCD (as opposed to the 256K colour display on the preceding Nokia N93) and a side joystick (replacing the D-Pad on its predecessor). Other changes are a charging LED underneath the mirror top and the relocation of the main speaker to the base unit.

=== Accelerometer ===
The N93i includes a built-in accelerometer much like the Nokia N95. Third-party applications have started to make use of the built in accelerometer including:

- RotateMe which automatically changes the screen rotation when the phone is tilted.
- NokMote which uses the accelerometer as a D-Pad and moves in the direction of tilt, much like the Wii Remote.
- ShutUp which turns the phone on Silent when it is turned face down.
- ShakeMe which can lock the keypad, toggle Bluetooth, turn on the backlight or toggle Silent Profile
- ShakeLock which will lock the phone when it is shaken.

=== Camera ===
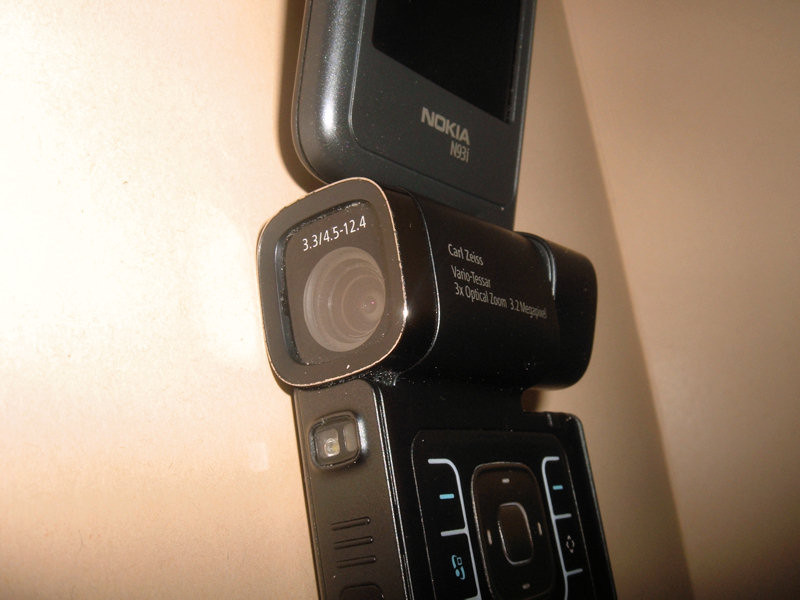
The N93i camera lens.

The camera is the main focus of the Nokia N93i, with video recording being one of the main aspects of the phone it also has high quality stereo sound which is recorded by the two microphones located at the top of the phone next to the power button.

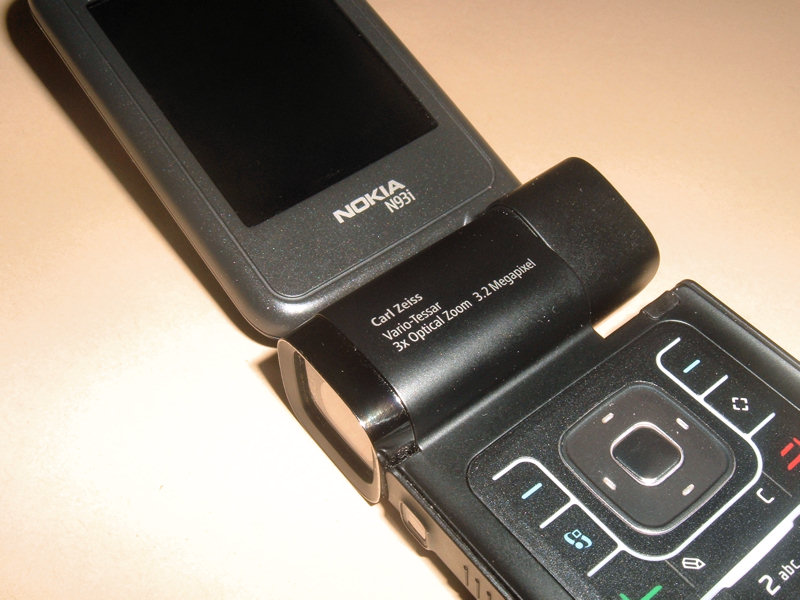
The N93i hinge with camera module.

Main camera

- Resolution: 2048 x 1536
- Focal length 4.5 mm
- F-Stop/Aperture f/3.3
- Focus range 10 cm to infinity
- Digital Zoom: 20 x
- Optical Zoom: 3 x
- Image Format: JPEG/Exif
- Feature: Auto Focus, Carl Zeiss Optics, Flash, Self Timer
- Video Resolution: 640 x 480
- Video Frame Rate: 30 frame/s
- Video Zoom: 8 x
- Video Format: H.263, H.264/AVC, MPEG-4
- Audio Format: H.253, H.244

Secondary camera

- Resolution: 288 x 352
- Image Format: JPEG/Exif
- Video Resolution: 176 x 144
- Video Frame Rate: 15 frame/s
- Video Zoom: 2 x
- Video Format: H.263

=== N-Gage ===
The N93i, while having a 3D graphics chip, is not an N-Gage 2.0 compatible device unlike other models such as the Nokia N81 and Nokia N95. Unlike other models, the N93 and N93i make use of all of the keys on the keypad due to their design, all keys can be used in both landscape and portrait mode, although being a little less accessible. Electronic enthusiasts made a modified version of the N-Gage client app which is compatible with Nokia N93i.

== Popular culture ==
An N93i is seen in the 2007 movie, Transformers. It is the device used to demonstrate the AllSpark's capability of turning any electronic device into a living robot. This phone turned out to be a Decepticon tiny but deadly robot.

The N93i used a different marketing strategy by incorporating Dallas based punk rock band Greyskull in its APAC campaign. Running an on-line competition in which contestants could submit their own videos to the band's songs. Ads featuring the band Greyskull were run in newspapers and commercials on MTV Asia.

During the 2007 Cannes Lions Advertising Festival, camera crews using Nokia N93i devices tagged along with the Young Creative Film Competitors on their 48-hour mission to shoot a 30-second commercial, also using the Nokia N93i, for MTV SWITCH, a campaign from MTV Networks International designed to educate and encourage alternative options to help save the planet. With 40 hours of content filmed on the Nokia N93i, the footage was edited into an exclusive behind the scenes documentary, "Short Film Shootout: Cannes", which was available for broadcast on MTV's 61 TV channels across 161 countries on 20 December 2007.

== Reviews ==
- All About Symbian N93i Review
- Phone Arena N93i Review
- N93 and N93i Reviews and specifications round-up
