= Nokia N93 =

Mobile phone

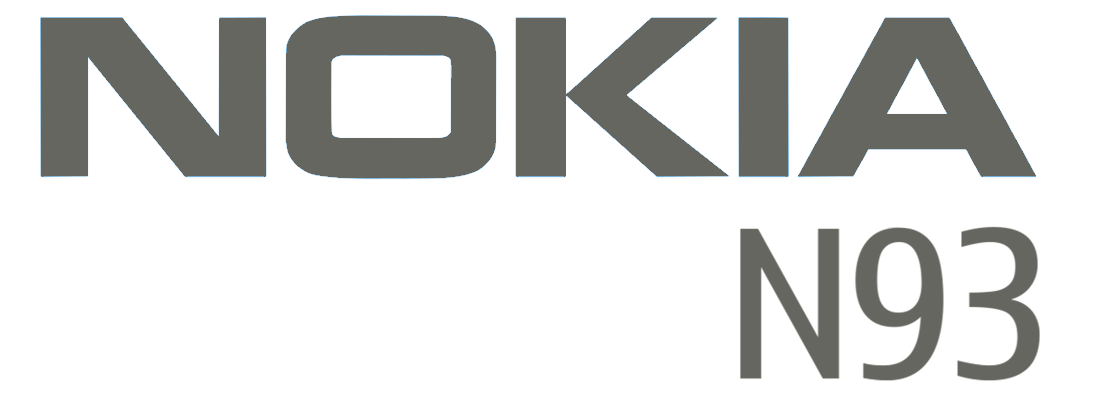

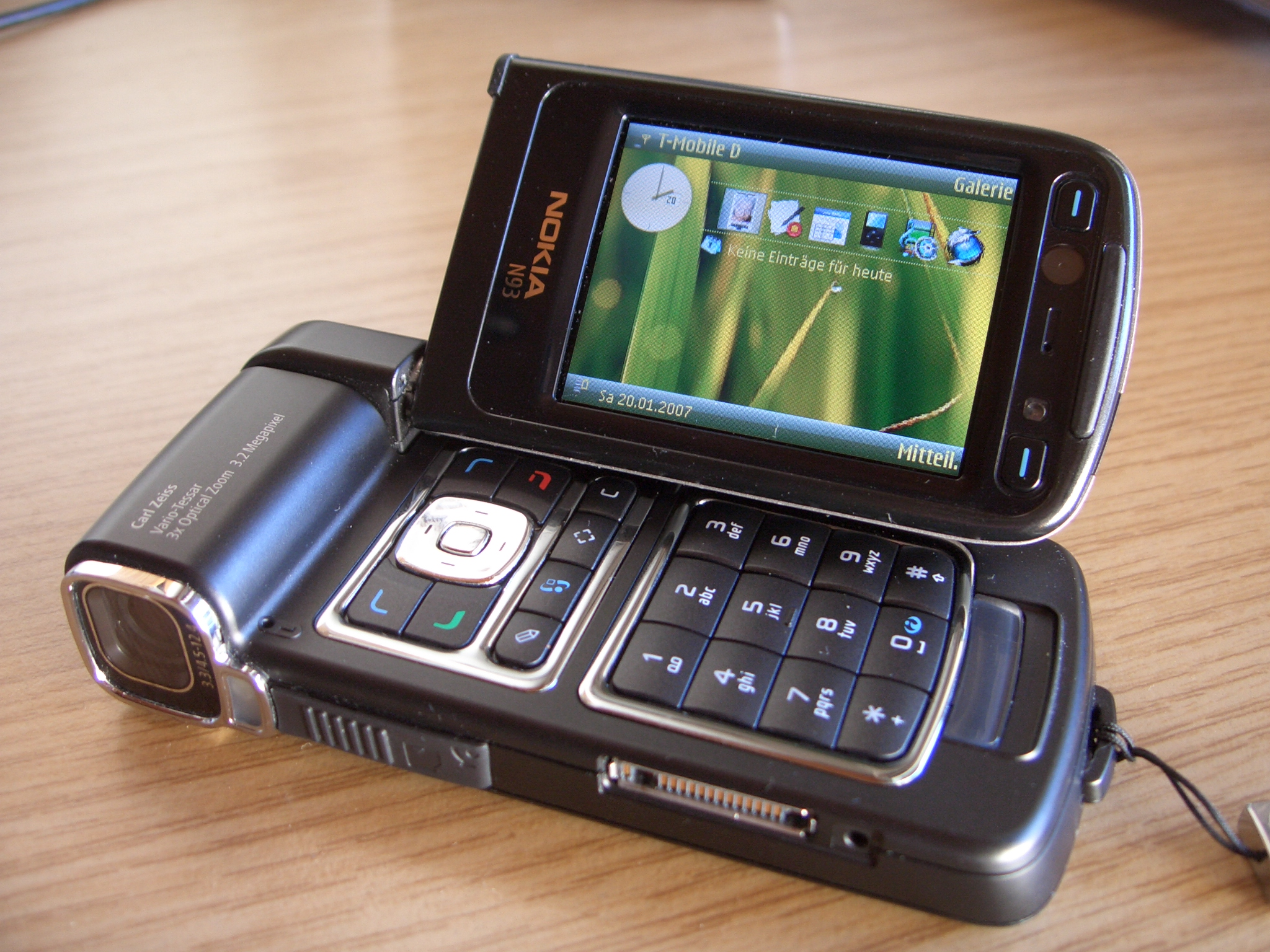
- Nokia N93
- Manufacturer: Nokia
- First released: July 2006; 20 years ago Announced April, 2006
- Availability by region: 2006
- Predecessor: Nokia N90
- Successor: Nokia N93i; Nokia N95
- Related: Nokia N92
- Compatible networks: HSCSD, UMTS, Tri band GSM / GPRS / EDGE, GSM 900, GSM 1800, GSM 1900
- Dimensions: 118×55.5×28.2 mm (4.65×2.19×1.11 in)
- Weight: 180 g (6 oz) (0.40 lb)
- Operating system: Symbian OS v9.1, S60 3rd Edition
- Memory: 50 MB
- Removable storage: MiniSD
- Battery: Li-Po 1100 mAh (BL – 6M)
- Rear camera: 3.2 Megapixels
- Display: 320 × 240 pixels; 262,144 colors
- Connectivity: Bluetooth 2.0, Infrared, Wi-Fi 802.11b/g, USB 2.0
- Data inputs: Keypad

The Nokia N93 is a mobile phone from Nokia, part of the multimedia-focused Nseries lineup. Released in 2006, it was the most advanced camera phone from Nokia at the time of its release, as well as being the first Nokia phone with an optical zoom.

N93 was particularly marketed for its swivel design like its predecessor Nokia N90, which mimics the appearance of a camcorder. The N93 improved upon camera capabilities over the N90. The phone has a 3.2-megapixel camera with 3x optical zoom, Zeiss optics and 30 fps 640×480 (VGA) MP4 video recording capability. It was succeeded by the Nokia N93i.

== Features ==
The Nokia N93 supports 3G (WCDMA 2100 MHz), EDGE and GSM (900/1800/1900 MHz) networks. It also has Push to Talk over Cellular (PoC), Wi-Fi (802.11b and g), an infrared port (for IrDA) and Bluetooth.

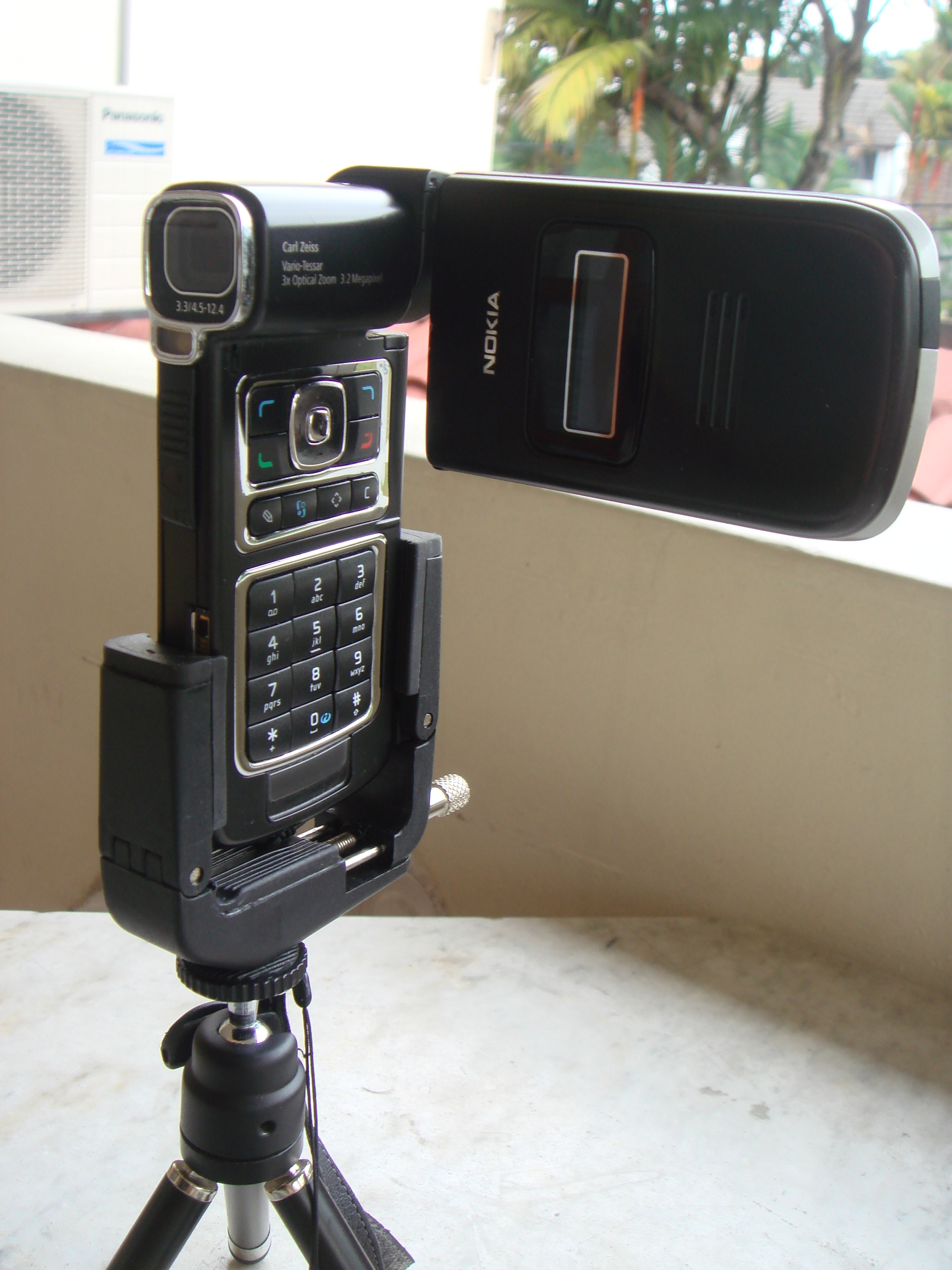
Nokia N93 mounted on an official tripod

The Nokia N93's 3.2-megapixel camera has Carl Zeiss Vario Tessar optics and flash, 3x optical zoom / 20x digital zoom, digital image stabilization, close up mode, and DVD-like video capture at 30 fps in the MPEG-4 format at VGA resolution. It was also advertised for "easy" video creation and burning to DVD with Adobe Premiere Elements 2.0.

Other than the camera, Nokia N93 has a 320×240 pixels; 262,144 colors 2.4" display and direct TV out connectivity. It has a Dual ARM 11 332 MHz CPU, 50 MB memory, 64 MB RAM, and up to 2 GB mini SD card storage (90 minutes of "DVD-like" video). Fully hardware accelerated PowerVR 3D graphics from Imagination Technologies (including OpenGL ES 1.1 and M3G, according to JBenchmark) is included. However despite Nokia having planned to support N-Gage 2.0 for N93 (alongside N73 and N93i), it never made it due to memory issues. Other features are a web browser, Adobe Flash Lite 1.1 preinstalled (supports Flash Lite 2.1 and Flash Lite 3.0 developer editions), Visual Radio, UPnP (Universal Plug and Play) support, Symbian application support, Java MIDP 2.0.

== Versions ==
As well as coming in 2 colors, pearl black and silver, there was also a Nokia N93 Golf Edition which had been preloaded with Pro Session Golf software to help improve golf skills. There was also a Mission: Impossible III edition which included a memory card preloaded with the movie and a Mission: Impossible III theme.

== In popular culture ==
The Nokia N93's likeness is used in the video game Tony Hawk's Project 8 as the way for players to view their in-game messages and videos.

== Reviews ==
- All About Symbian N93 Review (part 1) – Covers multimedia aspects of the phone
- All About Symbian N93 Review (part 2) – Covers smartphone aspects, and summary
- All About Symbian N90 vs N93
- Mobile-review N93 review
- N93 reviews and specifications round up
