= Nokia N78 =

Mobile phone

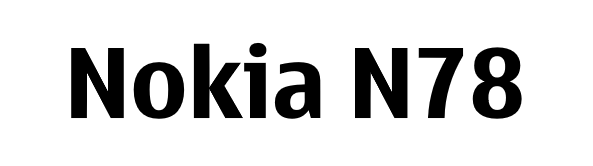

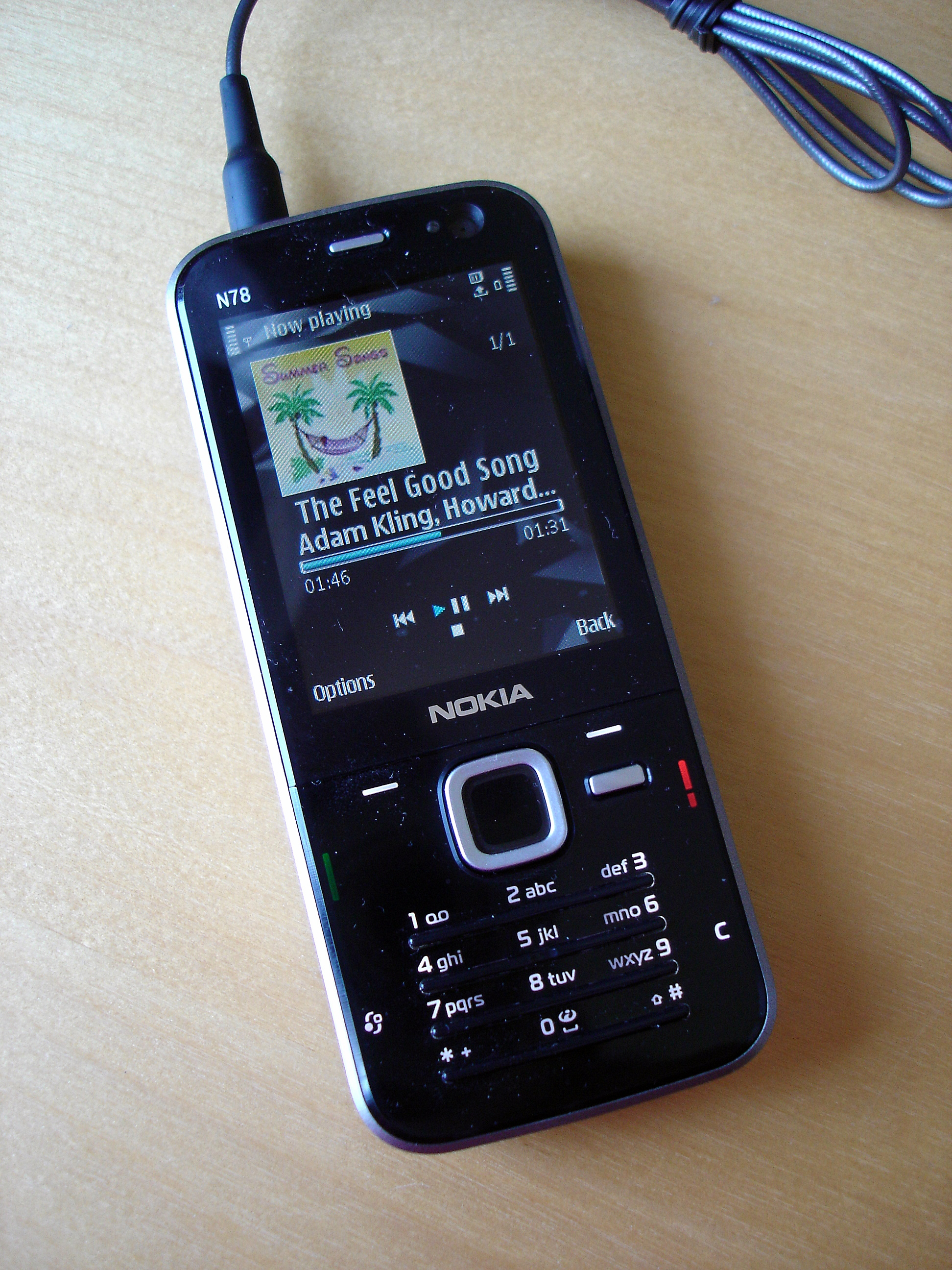
- Manufacturer: Nokia
- First released: February 2008; 18 years ago
- Availability by region: May 2008
- Predecessor: Nokia N73; Nokia N77
- Successor: Nokia N79
- Related: Nokia N81; Nokia N82; Nokia N85; Nokia N96
- Compatible networks: Quad band GSM/GPRS/EDGE: 850/900/1800/1900 MHz; Dual band WCDMA: 900/2100 MHz (N78-1 EU version) or 850/1900 MHz (N78-3 NA version) (UMTS, HSDPA)
- Form factor: Candy bar
- Dimensions: 113×49×15.1 mm (4.45×1.93×0.59 in) (L * W * T)
- Weight: 101.8 g (4 oz)
- Operating system: Symbian OS v9.2, S60 3rd Edition, Feature Pack 2
- CPU: Freescale 369 MHz
- Memory: 70 MB
- Removable storage: microSDHC
- Battery: BL-6F, 1200 mAh
- Rear camera: 3.2 MP / 2048 × 1536 pixels / Carl Zeiss optics
- Front camera: VGA video call camera
- Display: 240 × 320 pixels, 2.4-inch, 16,777,216 colours
- Connectivity: Bluetooth, Micro USB, SMS, MMS, Wifi
- Data inputs: Keypad

The Nokia N78 is a 3G mobile phone made by Nokia. It was first introduced at the Mobile World Congress on 11 February 2008, and was launched on 26 May 2008 for €350 before taxes and subsidies. It runs on Symbian 9.3 (S60 3rd Edition, FP2) and was marketed as a cheaper Nseries device inside a compact, light body. The phone is compatible with the N-Gage 2.0 mobile gaming service.

It is the successor of the N73 and its design shares similarities with the N81, N82 and N96. Despite its relatively low price, the Nokia N78 does still pack numerous standard Nseries features such as A-GPS, HSDPA and Wi-Fi. It has a touch-sensitive Navi wheel like on the N81, and was the first Nokia (and among the first overall, along with Sony Ericsson W980) to feature an FM transmitter. Its keypad is hidden in idle mode and lights up when a key is pressed. Later in 2008, the Nokia N79 was introduced.

The Nokia N78 was also the first Nokia phone with the rearranged guitar-based version of the Nokia Tune, which appeared in every subsequent Nokia phones until 2012.

== Firmware history ==
Firmware version 20.149 (dated 8 December 2008) became available for the generic (non-branded) N78 via its over-the-air update facility in January 2009.

The latest firmware version 21.002 released 18 February 2009 is the lightest update with a 214 KB downloaded file using FOTA. Many improvements were made to the overall performance of the device after the upgrade.

There is also firmware version 30.011 available through Nokia Software Updater. This update was released 8 May 2009 but was not available through FOTA.
