= Nokia N97 Mini =

2009 Symbian smartphone

Nokia N97 mini
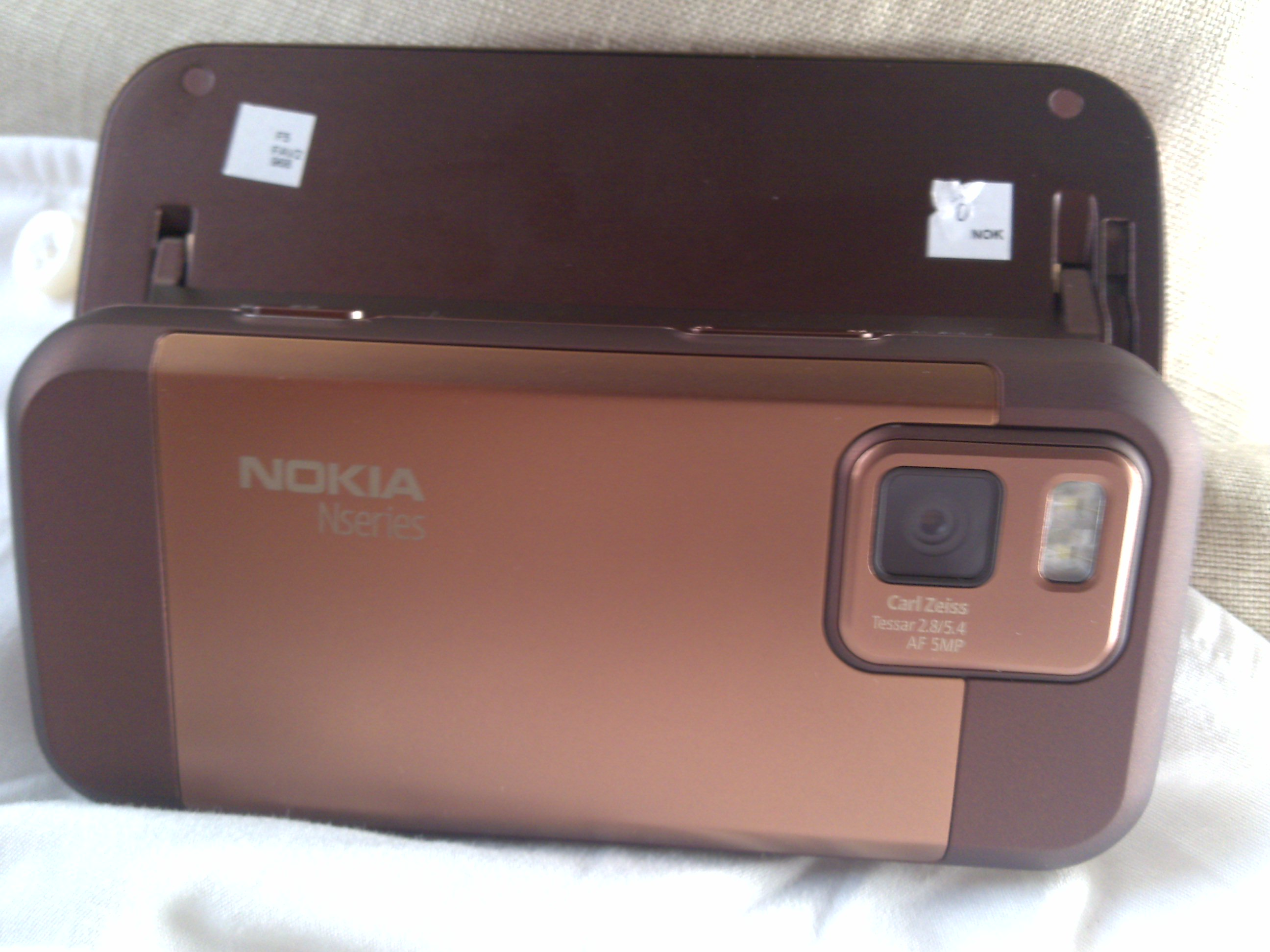
- Nokia N97 mini with slide-out QWERTY keyboard
- Developer: Nokia
- Manufacturer: Nokia
- Type: Smartphone
- Series: Nseries
- First released: November 2009; 16 years ago
- Predecessor: Nokia N97; Nokia N79
- Successor: Nokia C6-00; Nokia C7-00; Nokia C6-01
- Compatible networks: GSM / HSPA
- Form factor: Side slider
- Colors: Gold; Cherry Black; Garnet; White
- Dimensions: 113 mm × 52.5 mm × 14.2 mm (4.45 in × 2.07 in × 0.56 in), 75 cc
- Weight: 138 g (4.9 oz)
- Operating system: Symbian 9.4, Series 60 rel. 5
- CPU: 434 MHz ARM 11
- Memory: 128 MB RAM
- Storage: 8 GB internal, microSDHC slot
- SIM: Mini-SIM
- Battery: Removable Li-Ion 1200 mAh (BL-4D)
- Rear camera: 5 MP, autofocus Carl Zeiss optics, dual-LED flash, video light 480p@30fps
- Front camera: VGA; VGA@15fps
- Display: 3.2 in (81 mm) TFT resistive touchscreen, 16M colors 360 × 640 px, 16:9 ratio (~229 ppi)
- Sound: Stereo speakers 3.5mm jack
- Connectivity: Wi-Fi 802.11 b/g, UPnP; Bluetooth 2.0 (A2DP); GPS, A-GPS; Nokia Maps; Stereo FM radio, RDS; MicroUSB 2.0
- Other: Handwriting recognition, TV-out, predictive text input, accelerometer, proximity sensor, compass

The Nokia N97 Mini, announced in September 2009 and released two months later, is a refined and a slightly smaller version of the original Nokia N97. Nokia N97 Mini addressed many of its predecessor's shortcomings and criticisms, was well reviewed and went on to win several industry awards for the best handset.

== Specifications ==
=== Display ===
The device has a 3.2-inch TFT resistive touchscreen with a resolution of 360 × 640 pixels and support for 16 million colors. It supports handwriting recognition.

=== Performance ===
A 434 MHz ARM 11 processor powers the Nokia N97 mini and runs on Symbian 9.4 with Series 60 rel. 5 user interface. It has 128 MB RAM and 8 GB of internal storage, expandable via microSDHC cards.

=== Camera ===
The rear camera is a 5-megapixel unit with Carl Zeiss optics, autofocus, dual-LED flash, and a video light. It records video at 480p@30fps. The front camera is VGA resolution and supports VGA@15fps video recording.

Reviews were generally positive about the camera performance, but it was nowhere near the best-in-class at the time. Other Nokia phones were noted to have significantly better camera performance.

=== Build and design ===
The phone measures 113 × 52.5 × 14.2 mm with a volume of 75 cc and weighs 138 g. It features a slide-out QWERTY keyboard and a Mini-SIM slot.

=== Connectivity ===
Supported networks are GSM 850 / 900 / 1800 / 1900 and HSDPA 900 / 1900 / 2100 (or HSDPA 850 / 1900 / 2100 for the American version). It has Wi-Fi 802.11 b/g with UPnP, Bluetooth 2.0 with A2DP, GPS with A-GPS and Nokia Maps, a stereo FM radio with RDS, and MicroUSB 2.0.

=== Multimedia ===
The device supports MP3/WMA/WAV/eAAC+ audio formats, WMV/RealVideo/MP4 video formats, and includes TV-out functionality. It also features a voice command/dial system, document viewer (Word, Excel, PowerPoint, PDF), and video and photo editor.

=== Battery ===
The Nokia N97 mini is equipped with a removable 1200 mAh BL-4D battery. Official battery life estimates are:

- Stand-by: up to 320 hours (2G) / 310 hours (3G)
- Talk time: up to 7 hours 10 minutes (2G) / 6 hours (3G)
- Music playback: up to 32 hours
