= Nokia N96 =

Nokia mobile phone

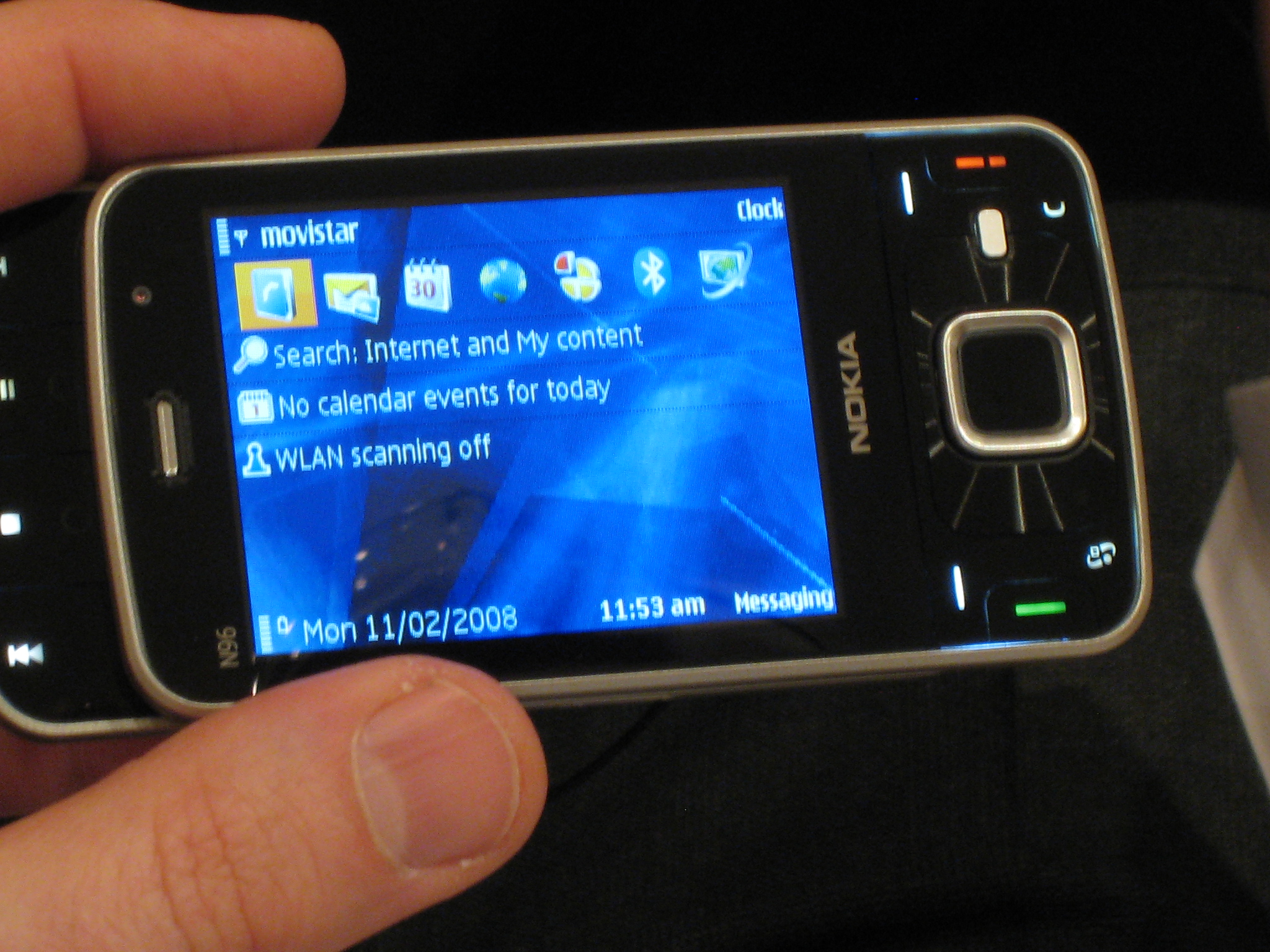
- Manufacturer: Nokia
- Availability by region: EU: 24 August 2008; NA: 15 September 2008
- Discontinued: Late 2009
- Predecessor: Nokia N82; Nokia N95
- Successor: Nokia N86 8MP; Nokia N97
- Related: Nokia N78; Nokia N79; Nokia N85; Nokia 5800 XpressMusic
- Compatible networks: Quad band GSM / GPRS / EDGE: GSM 850 / 900 / 1800 / 1900; Dual band UMTS / HSDPA: UMTS 900 / 2100 or UMTS 850 / 1900
- Form factor: Dual slider
- Dimensions: 103×55×18 mm (4.06×2.17×0.71 in)
- Weight: 125 g (4 oz)
- Operating system: Symbian OS 9.3 (S60 3rd Edition, Feature Pack 2)
- CPU: Nomadik dual ARM9 CPU (264 MHz) without video accelerator
- Memory: 128 MB SDRAM
- Storage: 16 GB flash
- Removable storage: microSDHC 16 GB max (32 GB max available in 2009, microSDXC 64 GB max available in 2011)
- SIM: miniSIM
- Battery: BL-5F (950 mAh)
- Rear camera: 5 MP autofocus, dual-LED flash, 8× image digital zoom, 4× video digital zoom, 480p video
- Front camera: VGA (0.3 MP)
- Display: 2.8" TFT QVGA (320x240 px
- Connectivity: Wi-Fi 802.11b/g, microUSB (USB 2.0), DVB-H class C, Bluetooth 2.0 (A2DP, EDR), GPS w/A-GPS
- Data inputs: Keypad, d-pad, multimedia keys, navigation wheel

The Nokia N96 is a high-end mobile phone announced by Nokia on 11 February 2008 at the Mobile World Congress in Barcelona as part of the Nseries line. The N96 runs Symbian OS v9.3 (S60 3rd Edition, FP2). It is compatible with the N-Gage 2.0 gaming platform and has a DVB-H TV tuner and AV output.

Compared to the popular Nokia N95 8GB, the N96 has a doubled flash storage capacity (16 GB), dual LED flashes and a slimmer design. However, critics had negative views on the N96's battery life and user-unfriendliness and its downgraded CPU clock speed raised questions. It was one of 2008's most anticipated mobile phones, but its launch was delayed and it was only widely available from October 2008. It is thus considered a commercial failure. Critics stated that the Nokia N85 provided more new features at a significantly lower price.

== Release ==
Shipments for the N96 began in September 2008. Europe, Middle East and Asia-Pacific were the first locations to provide the phone to consumers. The American and Chinese versions were expected shortly thereafter. In the US, the phone was sold for $900, which was seen as being too expensive. The general UK release date for the N96 was 1 October, although London had a separate date of 24 September, where the phone went on sale exclusively at Nokia's flagship stores on Regent Street and at Terminal 5 of Heathrow Airport.

== Differences from N95 8 GB ==
Additions:

- Dual-LED camera flash (single LED in N95 8 GB)
- New audio DSP
- Longer music playback time (14 hrs) and video playback time (6 hrs)
- Windows Media WMV9 video codec
- Hardware acceleration for H.264 and WMV video codecs
- DVB-H 1.0 receiver built in – only usable with paid subscription
- Flip-out stand for more comfortable viewing of content when placed on a flat surface (surrounds the lens assembly)
- S60 3rd Edition upgraded from Feature Pack 1 to Feature Pack 2
- linu v88.0.12.0
- Java ME engine upgraded from MIDP 2.0 to MIDP 2.1
- User data preserved when upgrading firmware - this feature is also present on the N95-2 as v21 installs UDP base files
- Open C/C++ support
- New QuickOffice application - opens all Microsoft Office files
- New version of Nokia Video Centre (show & edit videos)
- New release of Nokia Experience software
- 2.0 Hi-Speed microUSB (write 3 Mbit/s, read 4.1 Mbit/s) – N95 8 GB uses full-speed USB
- microSD memory card slot - as in original N95, while N95 8 GB has no card slot
- RSS 2.1 reader
- FM radio with RDS
- Dual-band HSDPA (900 and 2100 MHz) - N95 supports 2100 MHz only
- No need to open slider for optimal GPS reception
- VGA front camera - N95 8 GB has CIF front camera
- Video Flash lightguns
- Upgraded Bluetooth stereo audio
- FOTA (Firmware Over the Air)
- OMA E-mail Notification v1.0
- OMA Device Management v1.2
- OpenGL ES 1.1 plugin
- Dual Transfer Mode (MSC 11)
- SPP Bluetooth profiles

Removals:

- Free sat-nav service – Nokia advised that this was in the pipeline and that they fully expected it to be made available, but did not say when it would be available
- Support for Nokia Music Headset HS-45, AD-54
- CPU: N96 has dual ARM9 264 MHz with no floating point instructions, N95 has dual ARM11 332 MHz with vector floating point
- N96 has 8× image digital zoom and 4× video digital zoom while N95 has 20× image digital zoom and 8× video digital zoom, although the benefits of this are debatable
- Same battery as original N95 (950 mAh), but reportedly has a much better battery life due to software improvements under Feature Pack 2 - Nokia N95 8 GB has 1200 mAh battery
- No hardware 3D graphics accelerator
- No infrared port
- N95 has a lens cover and a high-quality shutter (both the N95 8 GB and N96 do not have this feature)
- No manually selected MMS messaging mode. If the user write a long text message, the N96 will automatically select the MMS mode which could stop recipients from receiving the message if they do not have MMS set up on their phones. A Nokia USA employee stated that there was an update in the works to fix this very soon. It is assumed that this automatic selection of MMS mode is due to Nokia's Smart Connectivity.
- The built-in VoIP client from N95 which allowed the user to make Internet calls without installing any additional software was removed from N96. Nevertheless, the VoIP 2.1 API still exists which can be used by software developers in their applications.
- The pencil key used to mark and unmark items and highlight text is not included, but this action can still be done by holding down the # key.

== In popular culture ==
In 2008, a video commercial advertising Nokia N96 Limited Edition Bruce Lee, became viral in the internet. The video, produced by the Beijing office of the J. Walter Thompson (JWT) agency and targeting a Chinese market, shows what looks like archival footage of Bruce Lee doing various tricks with nunchaku (playing table tennis, lighting a cigarette in another person's mouth and extinguishing thrown lighted matches mid-air). The video was specifically made like a never-seen-before footage of Bruce Lee (particularly, the ball in the video was digitally added in post-production), which was later admitted by the JWT chief creative officer Polly Chu. The associated website shown in the commercial, nokia-lee.com.cn, has since then been taken over by pornographic content.

The N96 also appears in Katy Perry's "Hot n Cold" music video.

== See also ==
- Nokia N85
- Sony Ericsson W995
- Sony Ericsson C905
- Samsung i8510 Innov8
