= Nokia N92 =

Mobile phone

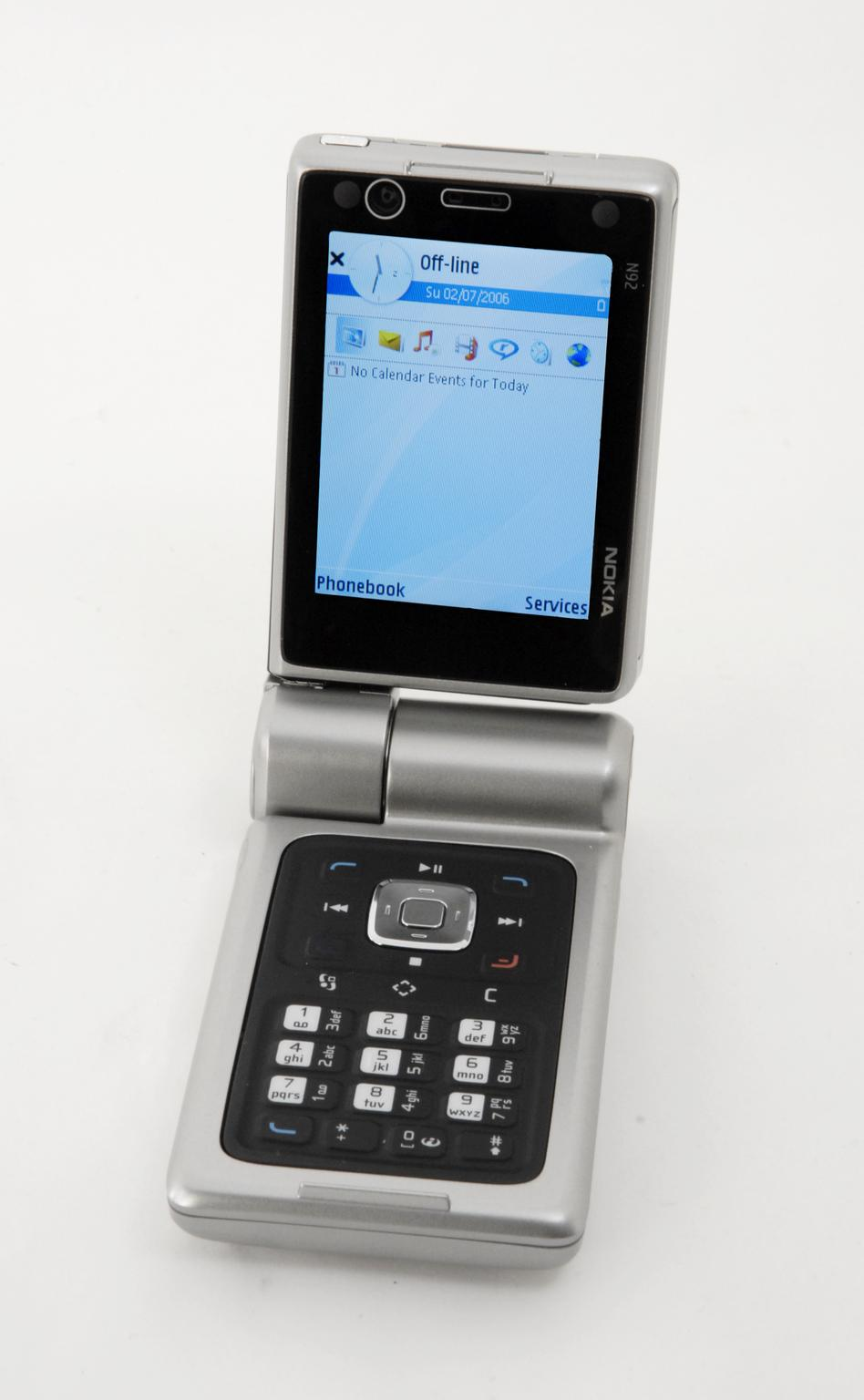
- Availability by region: Q2 2006
- Related: Nokia N90
- Compatible networks: UMTS (3G), Quad band GSM / GPRS / EDGE GSM 850, GSM 900, GSM 1800, GSM 1900
- Dimensions: 107×58×25 mm (4.21×2.28×0.98 in)
- Weight: 191 g (7 oz)
- Operating system: Symbian OS v9.1, S60 3rd Edition
- Memory: 160 MB (internal) + MiniSD Memory Card up to 2 GB
- Rear camera: 2 Megapixels
- Connectivity: PC via USB 2.0, Bluetooth 2.0, Wi-Fi, UPnP, Infrared

The Nokia N92 is a mobile phone part of the multimedia Nseries. It was announced on November 2, 2005 and was the world's first mobile phone with an integrated DVB-H tuner (excluding the experimental 7710). As a result, Nokia marketed it as a phone for watching TV on the go. It featured the same swivel design as the N90. It runs on Symbian OS v9.1 and the S60 3rd Edition interface.

Interesting features of the handset's DVB-H receiver include the program guide and the recording facility. The phone has a constant 30 second rolling record function for instant replay and can record broadcasts to memory card. Providers may charge for some of these features.

Elsewhere the N92 was also advanced, featuring a large 2.8" display (the largest at the time, excluding the Communicators), dedicated multimedia keys, 3G, Wi-Fi, UPnP, and a 2 megapixel camera with flash. Its CPU runs at a clock speed of 268 MHz. However it was considerably heavy (at 191 g), despite its size.

Upon release in Q2 2006 it retailed for 600 euros. The N92 is one of the rarest devices from Nokia and go for high prices on the second hand market.

== Design ==
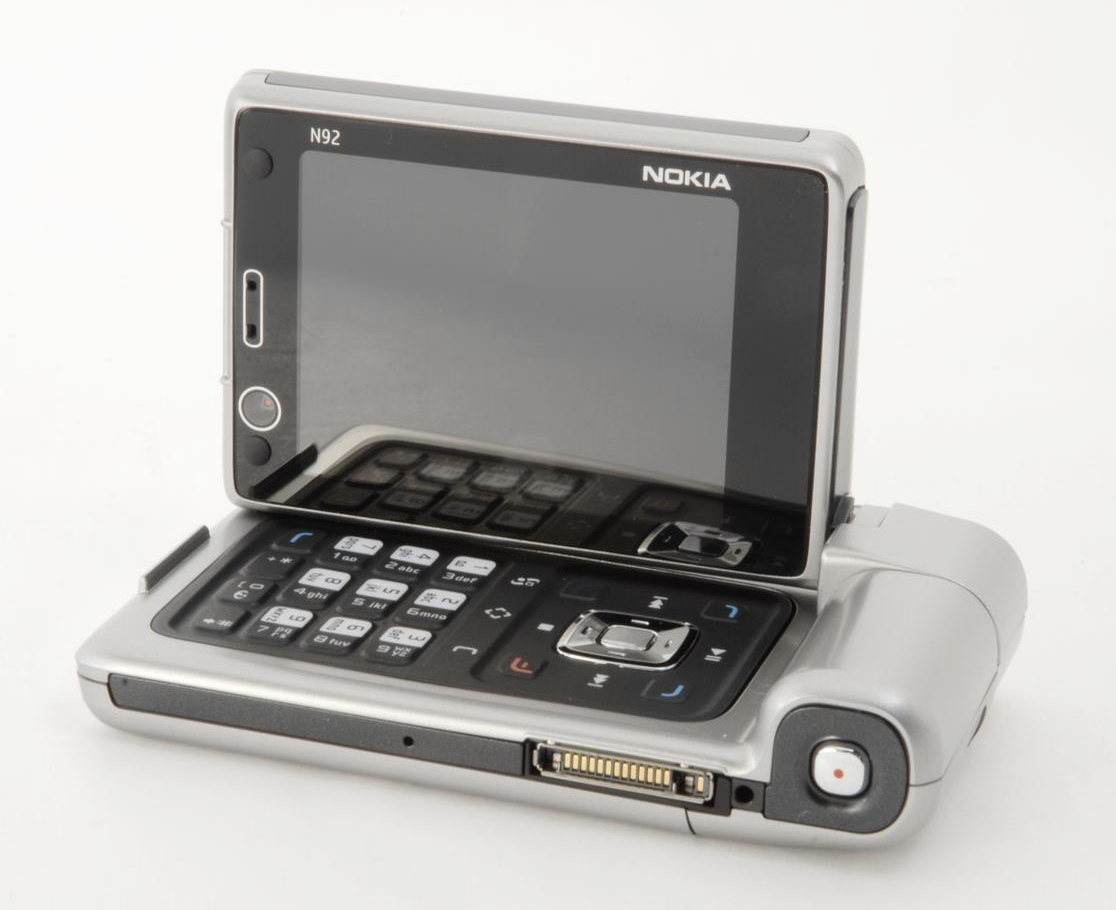
Nokia N92 folded for TV viewing

The keypad is unusual as it has numbers viewable in both portrait and landscape modes. This is to accommodate for the screen, which can be opened in two different positions:

1. Horizontal "clamshell"-like opening (like the Nokia 9300)
2. Open, twist then fold (like the Nokia N93)

Because of its unusual keypad, some users refer to it as confusing.
