= Download! =

Nokia application allowing access to media content

Logo of Nokia Download!

Nokia Download!, originally Nokia Catalogs, was a mobile application for Nokia devices that allowed access to digitally distributed media content. Catalogs/Download! came preloaded on most Symbian S60 smartphones from Nokia (from 2006), as well as some later Series 40 feature phones. Most of the content was paid.

The Catalogs/Download! store had access to applications, tones, videos, graphics, games, and news content from aggregators Nokia Software Market, WidSets, and third-parties like Handango, Jamster and Yahoo! Go. In June 2006 Nokia announced the Nokia Content Discoverer and signed deals that brought content from Electronic Arts, Warner Bros and others to the Content Discoverer.

Nokia had earlier in 2004 attempted to create such a system with Preminet, an end-to-end global sales channel. The Content Discoverer is effectively an evolution of it. Both the names Catalogs and Content Discoverer were soon replaced solely by "Download!".

A web client PC equivalent called Nokia Download Store was piloted under Nokia Beta Labs and was available from June 2008.

Download! was replaced by the Ovi Store in 2009.

== See also ==
- MOSH
- WidSets
- Handango
- Club Nokia
