= Microsoft Software Updater =

Windows Phone application

- Original author: Nokia
- Developer: Microsoft Mobile Oy
- Final release: 3.0.560 / 25 August 2011; 14 years ago
- Operating system: Windows, macOS
- Size: 33 MB
- Type: Patching software
- License: Freeware
- Website: microsoft.com/en/mobile/support/software-update/

Microsoft Software Updater (earlier Nokia Software Updater and Ovi Suite Software Updater) is a Windows and OS X (though the Mac version is only in Beta) based application launched in 2006, that enables customers to update and recover their mobile device firmware of a S40 or S60 or Lumia device from any Internet enabled access point. To avoid data loss users are prompted with on-screen advice on how to safely update their device.

In 2015 Microsoft Mobile offers four distinct software update applications, the Microsoft Software Updater serves primarily to update their feature phones, while the Lumia Software Recovery Tool and Windows Phone Recovery Tools are applications used to update and recover Windows Phone devices, though the Lumia Software Recovery Tool also supports Symbian and other Nokia platforms, and the Nokia Care Suite enables users to install Microsoft Mobile firmware updates for Microsoft Lumia devices. Further Microsoft Mobile offers desktop synchronisation applications which also offer updates to device components such as the Nokia Suite and its predecessor the Nokia PC Suite for legacy Nokia telephones, though the Nokia Suite also supports content migration for Microsoft Lumia devices such as messages, contacts, and device software.

All software suites except for the Windows Phone Recovery Tool were originally developed under Nokia while the Windows Phone Recovery Tool was created specifically for the Windows 10 Technical Preview for phones.

== History ==
The service was launched in beta in 2006, and the Nokia Software Updater's beta phase ended at 25 August 2011. Nokia Software Updater 3.0.495 was released to consumers in 2011. After acquisition of Nokia's devices and services divisions by Microsoft, the application was renamed to Microsoft Software Updater. the Microsoft Software Updater does not install any pre-release of Nokia device software, but will restore the latest updates.

The service can be used to restore the firmware on "bricked" phones which previously could only be done at local Microsoft Care customer service centres. Microsoft Care's range of software update and recovery programs also include a software recovery tool for Lumia-branded Windows Phones that don't start up or respond which may restore the latest firmware. The Recovery tool requires the telephone to have 70-80% battery charge and works only with Windows Phone 8 or higher devices.

In 2015 Microsoft used the software to update their Series 30+ based Nokia 130 devices.

== Lumia Software Recovery Tool ==
The Microsoft Care division of Microsoft Mobile had several other specialised versions of the Microsoft Software Updater. This included the Nokia Software Recovery Tool which can recover lost software and unbrick phones in a similar manner to the Microsoft Software Updater. Its primary aim is to restore lost data after failed update installation attempts. The 1.3.1 version requires Windows 7 or later and was a re-released version of the older Symbian recovery tool. As part of Microsoft's new wave of rebranding it was renamed the Lumia Software Recovery Tool. It was updated and renamed to Nokia Software Recovery Tool again in 2015. In 2016 Microsoft closed down all Nokia sites and download servers. This affected all Nokia firmware downloader softwares. In 2017 Microsoft has outsourced the old Nokia phone software service to a rather unknown company named B2X.

== Windows Device Recovery Tool ==
In February 2015, to coincide with the launch with the technical preview of Windows 10 Mobile, Microsoft launched a similar application for Windows Insiders known as the Windows Phone Recovery Tool. This application will remove Windows 10 from the device and restore the most current Windows Phone 8.1 software and the device's latest available firmware (i.e. Lumia Cyan or Lumia Denim).

Microsoft issued an update to the Windows Phone Recovery Tool in April 2015 to address difficulties for Nokia Lumia 520 and other low-memory devices while installing the Windows 10 technical preview, because their limited (512 MB) memory caused these devices to become "bricked". The update resolved these issues by lowering the data blocks being fed to the device from 2MB to 128kBs at a time while recovering these defective models.

On 13 May 2015 Microsoft added support for the HTC One (M8) for Windows devices in version 2.0.3 while earlier the Windows Phone Recovery Tool exclusively worked with Microsoft/Nokia Lumia devices. In September 2015 Microsoft updated the Windows Phone Recovery Tool which renamed it to the Windows Device Recovery Tool alongside several minor fixes such as improved support features, and some accessibility improvements. In November 2015 Microsoft added additional support for another non-Microsoft made Windows mobile device, the LG Lancet.

On 30 March 2016 Microsoft added support for the Microsoft HoloLens and the Microsoft HoloLens Clicker devices which is a Windows 10-based augmented reality headset and companion device based on Windows Holographic.

== Microsoft Care ==
Microsoft Care (formerly Nokia Care) centres are physical locations created to deliver personalised customer support services and fix broken Lumia and Nokia-branded devices. This centres employ highly skilled engineers to repair and fix Nokia and Microsoft devices, though initially Nokia Care centres were the only place where customers could upgrade their Symbian devices prior to the launch of the Nokia Software Updater.

In rural African areas Microsoft Mobile operates Microsoft Care as a service to deliver customer support with vans by sending engineers, which can be reached via an SMS-warranty scheme.

In June 2015, Microsoft announced it will rebrand its Nokia Care centres to Microsoft Care and then Lumia Care Point Locations. It was later reported that Microsoft would close the majority of their care facilities in Poland and other European countries in favour of having more large centralised facilities as opposed to smaller ones being a part of the larger restructuring within Microsoft's mobile devices strategy based on their plan of laying off former Nokia employees.

== See also ==
- Nokia Suite
- Nokia PC Suite
- Ovi (Nokia)
- Zune software
- Microsoft Mobile Services
