= Walter Estrada =

Colombian boxer (born 1976)

Walter Estrada (born May 6, 1976 in Canalete) is a Colombian professional boxer and is the former WBA Fedecaribe Featherweight Champion.

== Professional career ==
=== WBO Featherweight Championship ===
In his first World title fight Estrada lost to WBO Featherweight Champion, Scott Harrison.

In October 2008, Estrada lost to an undefeated Mikey Garcia.

On November 27, 2010 Estrada would go on to score a huge upset victory over former world champion Nate Campbell. The bout was held on the undercard of Juan Manuel Marquez vs. Michael Katsidis.

== Professional boxing record ==
46 Wins (30 knockouts), 20 Losses (12 knockouts), 1 Draw
Res.	Record	Opponent	Type	Round Time	Date	Location	Notes
Loss	46–19-1	(Denmark) Dennis Ceylan	TKO	2 (8)	2015-12-12	Brøndby Hall, Brondby, Denmark	
Loss	46–18-1	(Argentina) Matias Rueda	TKO	4 (10)	2015-04-25	Club Union y Progreso, Tandil, Argentina	For WBO Latino featherweight title.
Loss	46–17-1	(Panama) Jezreel Corrales	TKO	1 (10)	2014-11-20	Hotel RIU, Panama City, Panama	For South American super Featherweight title.
Loss	42–16-1	(Russia) Eduard Troyanovsky	TKO	2 (12)	2012-12-17	Crocus City Hall, Myakinino, Russia	For PABA lightweight title.
Loss	39–15-1	(United States) Jessie Vargas	KO	2 (10)	2011-07-08	(United States) Buffalo Bill's Star Arena, Primm, Nevada, U.S.	
Loss	38–14-1	(United States) Vicente Escobedo	UD	10	2011-03-04	(United States) Fantasy Springs Casino, Indio, California, U.S.	
Win	38–13-1	(United States) Nate Campbell	SD	8	2010-11-27	(United States) MGM Grand, Las Vegas, Nevada, U.S.	
Draw	35–13-1	(Canada) Logan McGuinness	MD	6	2010-05-22	(United States) Mohegan Sun Casino, Uncasville, Connecticut, U.S.	
Loss	35–12	(United States) Luis Ramos, Jr.	UD	4	2010-02-25	(United States) Club Nokia, Los Angeles, California, U.S.	
Loss	35–10	(Philippines) Michael Farenas	KO	1 (8)	2009-05-01	(United States) Hard Rock Hotel and Casino, Las Vegas, Nevada, U.S.	
Loss	35–9	(Cuba) Yuriorkis Gamboa	KO	1 (8)	2009-02-20	(United States) Don Taft University Center, Fort Lauderdale, Florida, U.S.	
Loss	34–8	(Puerto Rico) Román Martínez	UD	10	2008-12-13	José Miguel Agrelot Coliseum, San Juan, Puerto Rico	
Loss	34-7	(United States) Mikey Garcia	UD	8	2008-10-31	(United States) Hard Rock Hotel and Casino, Las Vegas, Nevada, U.S.	
Loss	34-6	(United Kingdom) Kevin Mitchell	UD	12	2008-06-07	(United States) Boardwalk Hall, Atlantic City, New Jersey, U.S.	For WBO Inter-Continental super featherweight title.
Loss	28-4	(Panama) Vicente Mosquera	TKO	8 (10)	2005-12-10	Figali Convention Center, Panama City, Panama	
Loss	26-3	(Scotland) Scott Harrison	TKO	5 (12)	2004-03-06	Braehead Arena, Glasgow, Scotland	For WBO featherweight title.
