= Orangeville, Ontario =

Town in Ontario, Canada

Orangeville
- Town (lower-tier)
- Town of Orangeville
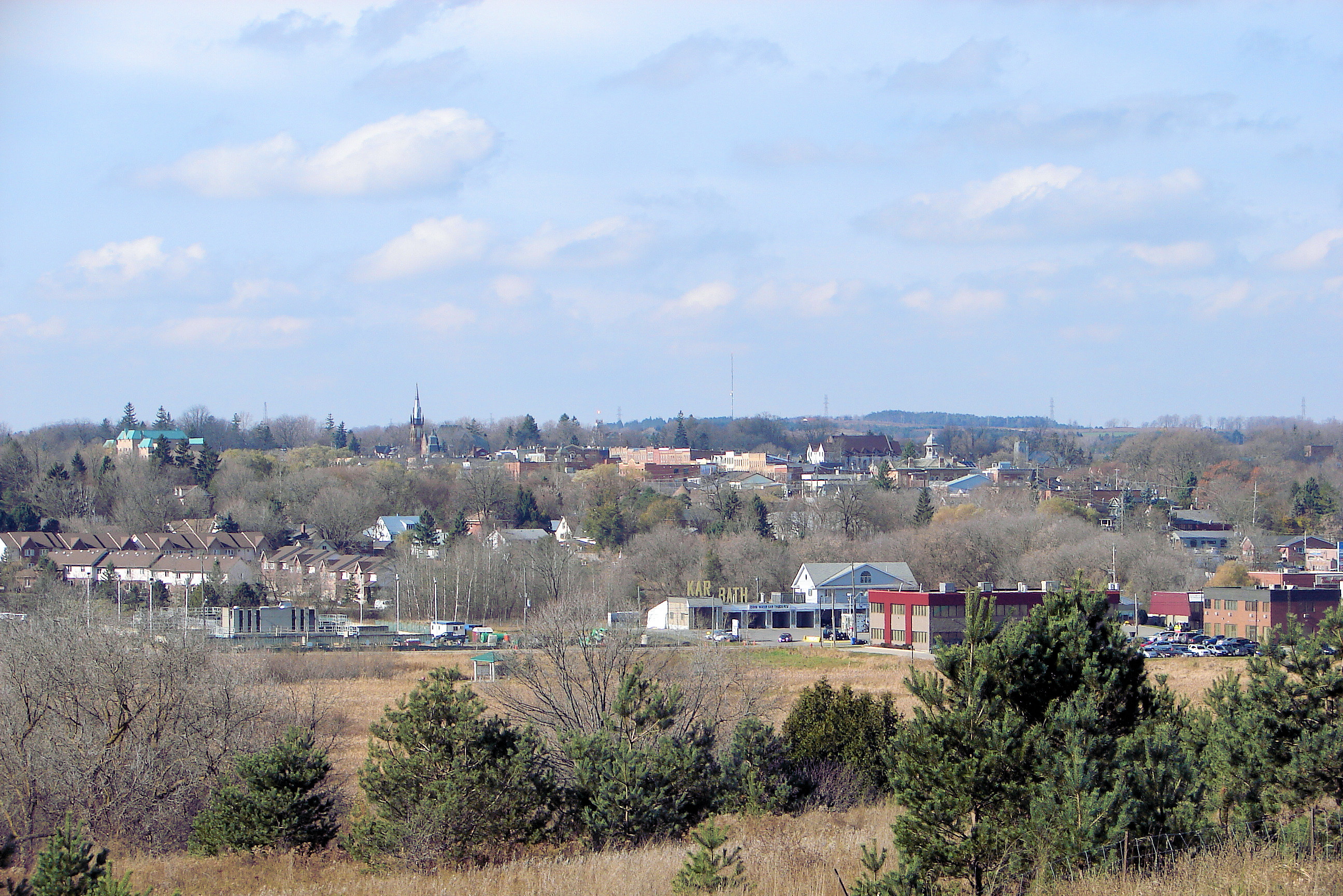

- Coat of arms
- Motto: "Dynamic future. Historic charm."
- Location of Orangeville within Dufferin County

- Location of Orangeville in southern Ontario
- Coordinates: 43°54′55″N 80°06′31″W
- Country: Canada
- Province: Ontario
- County: Dufferin
- Incorporated: 1863 (village)
- Incorporated: 1873 (town)

Government
  - Type: Mayor-council government
  - Mayor: Lisa Post
  - Fed. riding: Dufferin—Caledon
  - Prov. riding: Dufferin—Caledon

Area
  - Land: 15.16 km^{2} (5.85 sq mi)
  - Urban: 19.77 km^{2} (7.63 sq mi)
- Elevation: 411.50 m (1,350.1 ft)

Population (2021)
  - Total: 30,167
  - Density: 1,989.5/km^{2} (5,153/sq mi)
  - Urban: 34,177
  - Urban density: 1,728.9/km^{2} (4,478/sq mi)
- Time zone: UTC-5 (EST)
  - Summer (DST): UTC-4 (EDT)
- Postal code FSA: L9V to L9W
- Area codes: 519, 226
- Highways: Highway 10; Highway 9
- Website: www.orangeville.ca

Orangeville is a town in south-central Ontario, Canada, and is the seat of Dufferin County.

The first patent of land was issued to Ezekiel Benson, a land surveyor, on August 7, 1820. That was followed by land issued to Alan Robinet in 1822.

== History and naming ==
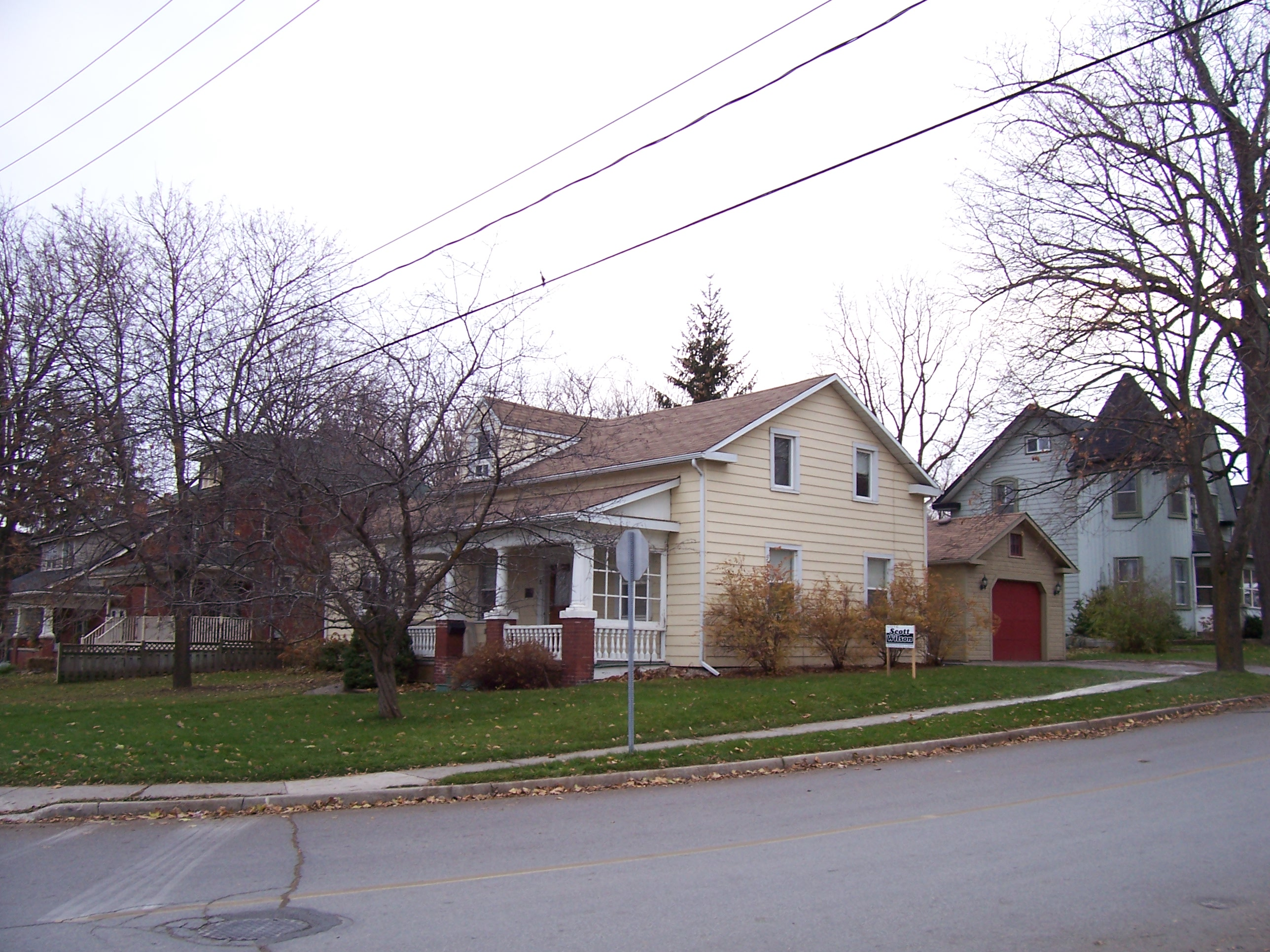
The house of Orangeville founder Orange Lawrence as it stands today

In December 1863 Orangeville was incorporated as a village. Orangeville was named after Orange Lawrence, a businessman born in Connecticut in 1796 who owned several mills in the village. As a young man, he moved to Canada and settled in Halton County. During Mackenzie's rebellion in 1837, he was a captain in the militia. Lawrence purchased the land that became Orangeville from Robert Hughson. He settled in the area in 1844 and established a mill. The post office dates from 1851. Orange Lawrence died by suicide December 15, 1861. In 1873, the Act of Incorporation was passed and Orangeville was given town status on January 1, 1874. The public library, located at Broadway and Mill Street, was completed in 1908. Andrew Carnegie, well-known businessman and philanthropist, provided financial assistance for its construction.

== Geography ==
=== Climate ===
Climate data for Orangeville MOE Climate ID: 6155790; coordinates 43°55′06″N 80°05′11″W; elevation: 411.5 m (1,350 ft); 1981−2010 normals, extremes 1961–2006
Month	Jan	Feb	Mar	Apr	May	Jun	Jul	Aug	Sep	Oct	Nov	Dec	Year
Record high °C (°F)	14.5 (58.1)	13.0 (55.4)	22.5 (72.5)	28.5 (83.3)	32.0 (89.6)	34.0 (93.2)	35.0 (95.0)	35.5 (95.9)	33.0 (91.4)	28.3 (82.9)	22.8 (73.0)	18.0 (64.4)	35.5 (95.9)
Mean daily maximum °C (°F)	−3.4 (25.9)	−2.1 (28.2)	2.8 (37.0)	10.6 (51.1)	17.6 (63.7)	22.8 (73.0)	25.2 (77.4)	24.2 (75.6)	19.9 (67.8)	12.7 (54.9)	5.6 (42.1)	−0.6 (30.9)	11.3 (52.3)
Daily mean °C (°F)	−7.5 (18.5)	−6.5 (20.3)	−2.1 (28.2)	5.3 (41.5)	11.7 (53.1)	16.9 (62.4)	19.4 (66.9)	18.4 (65.1)	14.3 (57.7)	7.8 (46.0)	2.0 (35.6)	−4.1 (24.6)	6.3 (43.3)
Mean daily minimum °C (°F)	−11.6 (11.1)	−10.9 (12.4)	−7.0 (19.4)	0.0 (32.0)	5.7 (42.3)	10.9 (51.6)	13.5 (56.3)	12.6 (54.7)	8.7 (47.7)	3.0 (37.4)	−1.7 (28.9)	−7.5 (18.5)	1.3 (34.3)
Record low °C (°F)	−36.0 (−32.8)	−36.5 (−33.7)	−34.4 (−29.9)	−20.0 (−4.0)	−6.1 (21.0)	−2.2 (28.0)	0.6 (33.1)	−1.1 (30.0)	−5.6 (21.9)	−10.6 (12.9)	−18.0 (−0.4)	−33.0 (−27.4)	−36.0 (−32.8)
Average precipitation mm (inches)	64.3 (2.53)	54.5 (2.15)	60.9 (2.40)	70.1 (2.76)	86.6 (3.41)	81.3 (3.20)	80.8 (3.18)	88.2 (3.47)	87.0 (3.43)	76.6 (3.02)	87.1 (3.43)	64.2 (2.53)	901.5 (35.49)
Average rainfall mm (inches)	25.7 (1.01)	22.7 (0.89)	38.2 (1.50)	63.5 (2.50)	86.6 (3.41)	81.3 (3.20)	80.8 (3.18)	88.2 (3.47)	87.0 (3.43)	74.3 (2.93)	72.4 (2.85)	29.4 (1.16)	750.1 (29.53)
Average snowfall cm (inches)	38.5 (15.2)	31.8 (12.5)	22.7 (8.9)	6.6 (2.6)	0.0 (0.0)	0.0 (0.0)	0.0 (0.0)	0.0 (0.0)	0.0 (0.0)	2.3 (0.9)	14.7 (5.8)	34.9 (13.7)	151.5 (59.6)
Average precipitation days (≥ 0.2 mm)	14.3	10.9	11.3	12.2	12.9	11.9	10.5	11.9	12.2	14.3	14.6	14.1	151.0
Average rainy days (≥ 0.2 mm)	3.6	3.3	5.6	10.7	12.9	11.9	10.5	11.9	12.2	14.0	10.8	4.5	112.0
Average snowy days (≥ 0.2 cm)	11.3	8.1	6.2	1.9	0.0	0.0	0.0	0.0	0.0	0.8	4.5	10.0	42.8
Source: Environment and Climate Change Canada

== Demographics ==
In the 2021 Census of Population conducted by Statistics Canada, Orangeville had a population of 30,167 living in 11,059 of its 11,308 total private dwellings, a change of 4.4% from its 2016 population of 28,900. With a land area of 15.16 km^{2} (5.85 sq mi), it had a population density of 1,989.9/km^{2} (5,153.8/sq mi) in 2021.

The median age was 38.8 years, lower than the national median age of 41.6 years. The median value of a dwelling in Orangeville was $750,000, higher than the national average at $472,000, and the median household income (after-taxes) was $89,000, higher than the national median of $73,000.

Historical census populations – Orangeville, Ontario

Year	Pop.	±%
1871	1,458	—
1881	2,847	+95.3%
1891	2,962	+4.0%
1901	2,511	−15.2%
1911	2,340	−6.8%
1921	2,187	−6.5%
1931	2,614	+19.5%

Year	Pop.	±%
1941	2,718	+4.0%
1951	3,249	+19.5%
1961	4,593	+41.4%
1971	8,074	+75.8%
1981	13,740	+70.2%
1991	17,921	+30.4%
1996	21,498	+20.0%

Year	Pop.	±%
2001	25,248	+17.4%
2006	26,925	+6.6%
2011	27,975	+3.9%
2016	28,900	+3.3%
2021	30,167	+4.4%

== Economy ==
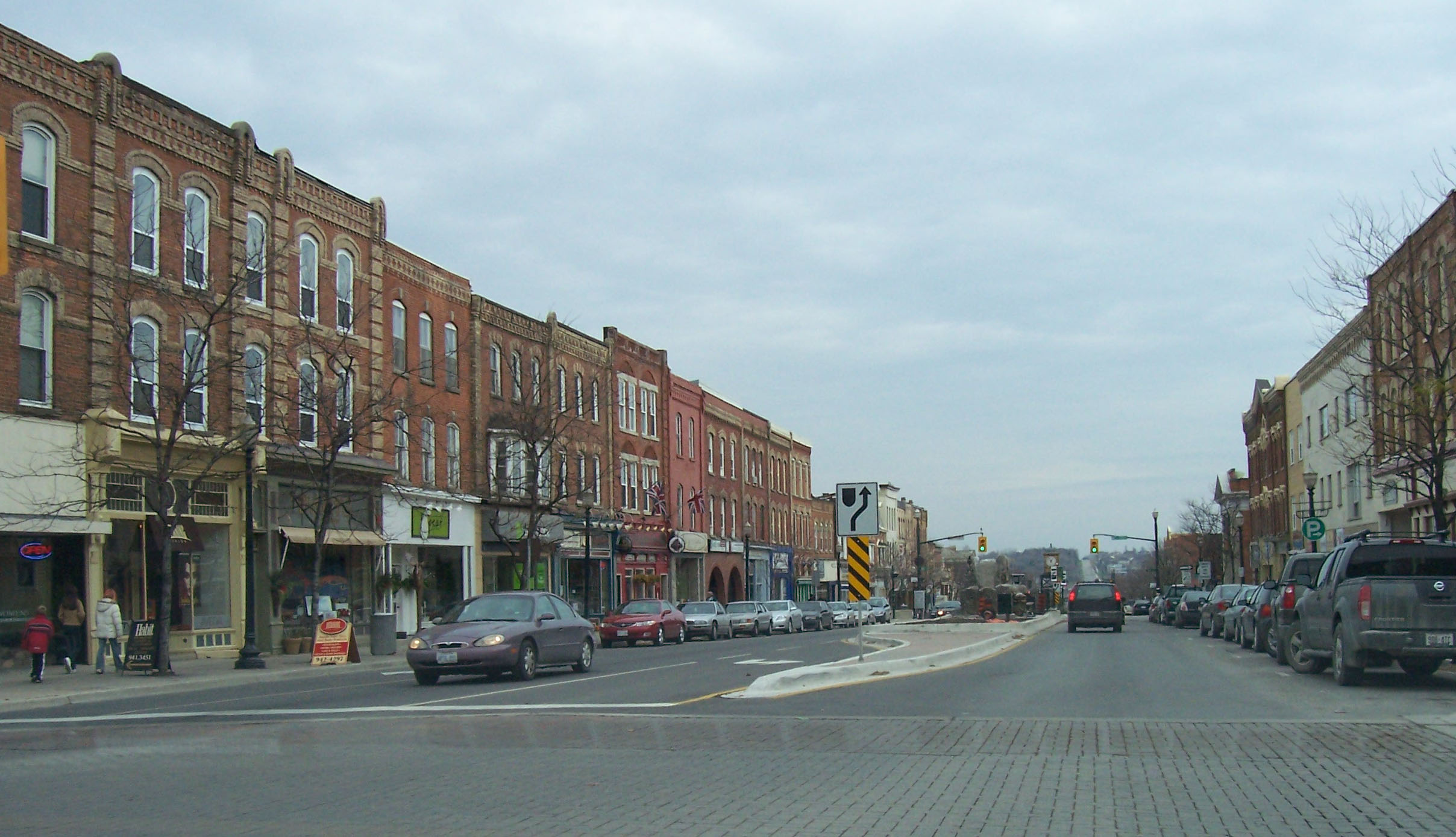
Businesses on Broadway through downtown Orangeville

Orangeville serves as an administrative and commercial hub for Dufferin County, which sits to the north of the Region of Peel. Orangeville's downtown core is home to a substantial number of retail stores, and there is a cluster of big-box stores in the Fairgrounds Shopping Centre. Many residents in and around Orangeville also commute to different areas of the Greater Toronto Area and Southwestern Ontario for work.

There are a number of manufacturing plants located in the town. Major commercial and industrial employers include: the Resolve Corporation, a provider of computer outsourcing services; Allied Threaded Products, a fastener manufacturer; Greening Donald, a maker of automotive airbag components; Clorox Company of Canada, Glad garbage bags; Relizon Canada, pressure-sensitive labels; Rochling Engineering Plastics, formerly Symplastics Limited, plastic sheets; and Sanoh Canada, automotive components. Orangeville is also the main banking centre for residents in the area.

== Government ==
Orangeville is located in provincial electoral district of Dufferin—Caledon. This was changed from Dufferin—Peel—Wellington—Grey when the Province instituted the 107 electoral districts revision in 2006. Its current Member of Provincial Parliament is Sylvia Jones, former assistant to Progressive Conservative Party of Ontario leader, John Tory. Federally, Orangeville is located in the Dufferin—Caledon electoral district. Its elected Member of Parliament is currently Kyle Seeback of the Conservative Party.

== Culture ==
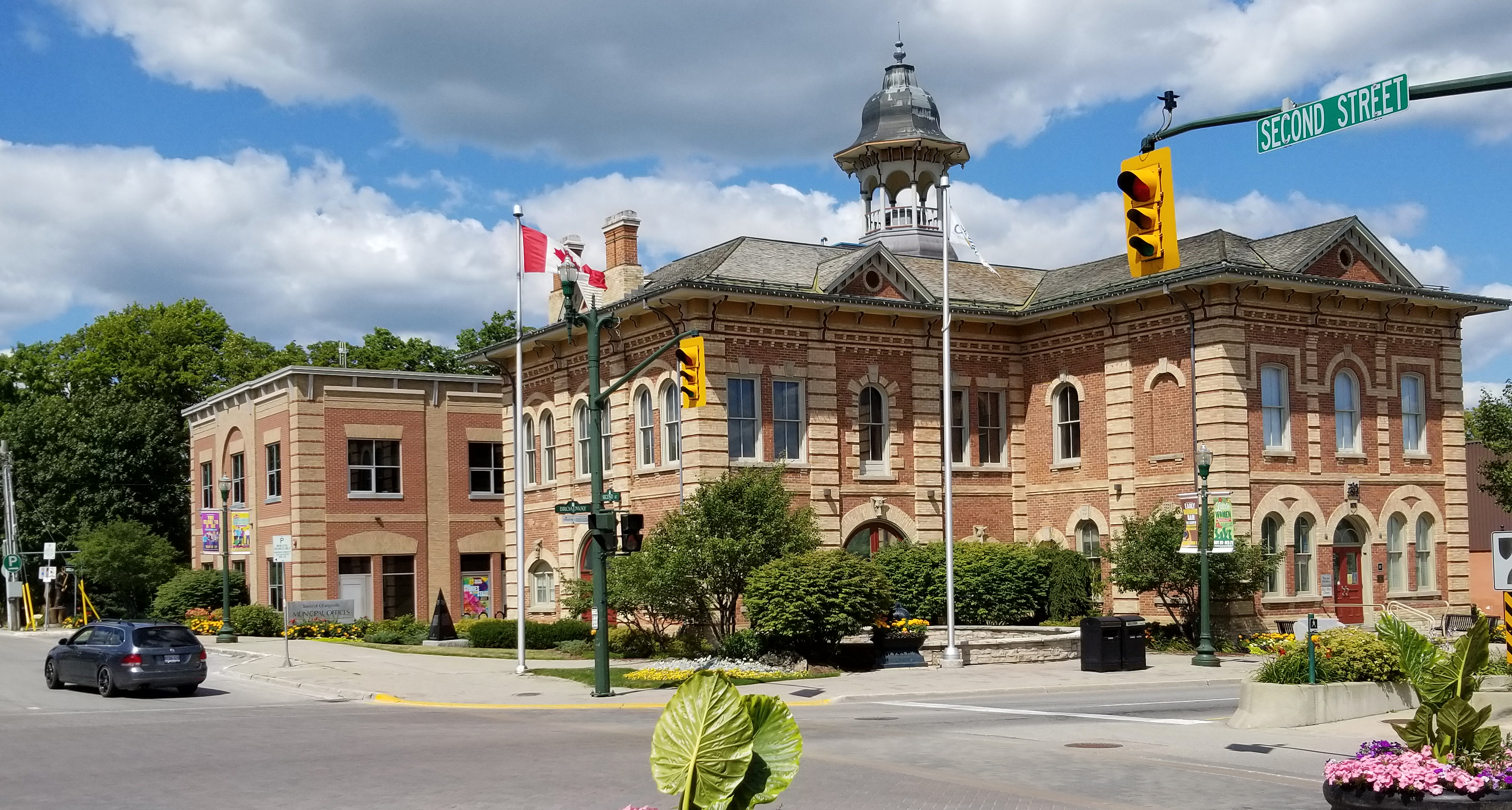
Built c. 1871, the town hall contains the opera hall

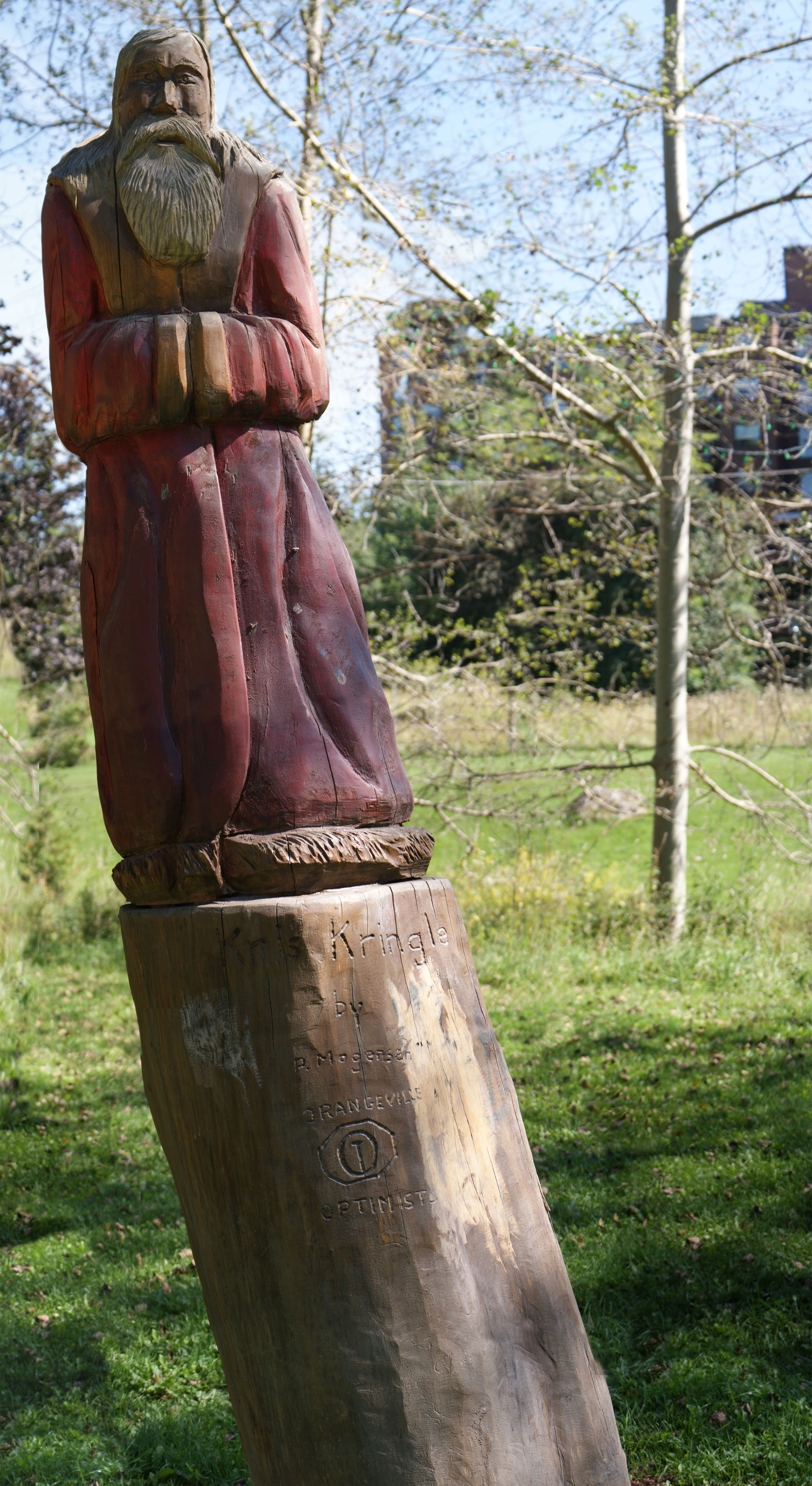
Statue of Santa Claus in Kay Cee Gardens, other wooden statues can be seen throughout the town

Orangeville hosts the annual Orangeville Blues and Jazz Festival, typically the first full weekend in June.

The Town Hall building contains the historic Orangeville Opera House on the second floor. The building was restored in 1993–1994. This facility is the home base of professional theatre company Theatre Orangeville, and hosts plays and concerts throughout the year.

Begun in 2003, Orangeville's Art Walk of Tree Sculptures features more than 50 detailed works by local artists. The sculptures are carved from old maple trees that have died from natural causes. The largest tree sculpture is a tribute to Canadiana and the centrepiece of a small newly developed park. It is a story totem entitled Nature's Unity, and celebrates Canada's 150th birthday.

Orangeville is also host to the annual Dufferin Film Festival which began in August, 2024. The event features Canadian short films, parties, networking, workshops and an industry speaker event.

== Sports ==
The Orangeville Flyers were a junior 'A' ice hockey team and part of the Ontario Junior Hockey League. They played home games at the Alder Street Recreation Facility until moving to Brampton in 2018. Orangeville was also home to a professional basketball team, the Orangeville A's of the National Basketball League of Canada, who played at the Orangeville Athlete Institute. The Athlete Institute Academy is home to Orangeville Prep, which has produced two top-10 NBA draft picks and 3 NBA champions.

The Orangeville Northmen junior A and B box lacrosse teams are based in Orangeville. The Orangeville Otters are a competitive swim team based in Orangeville. The team trains at the Alder and Tony Rose pools.

== Transportation ==
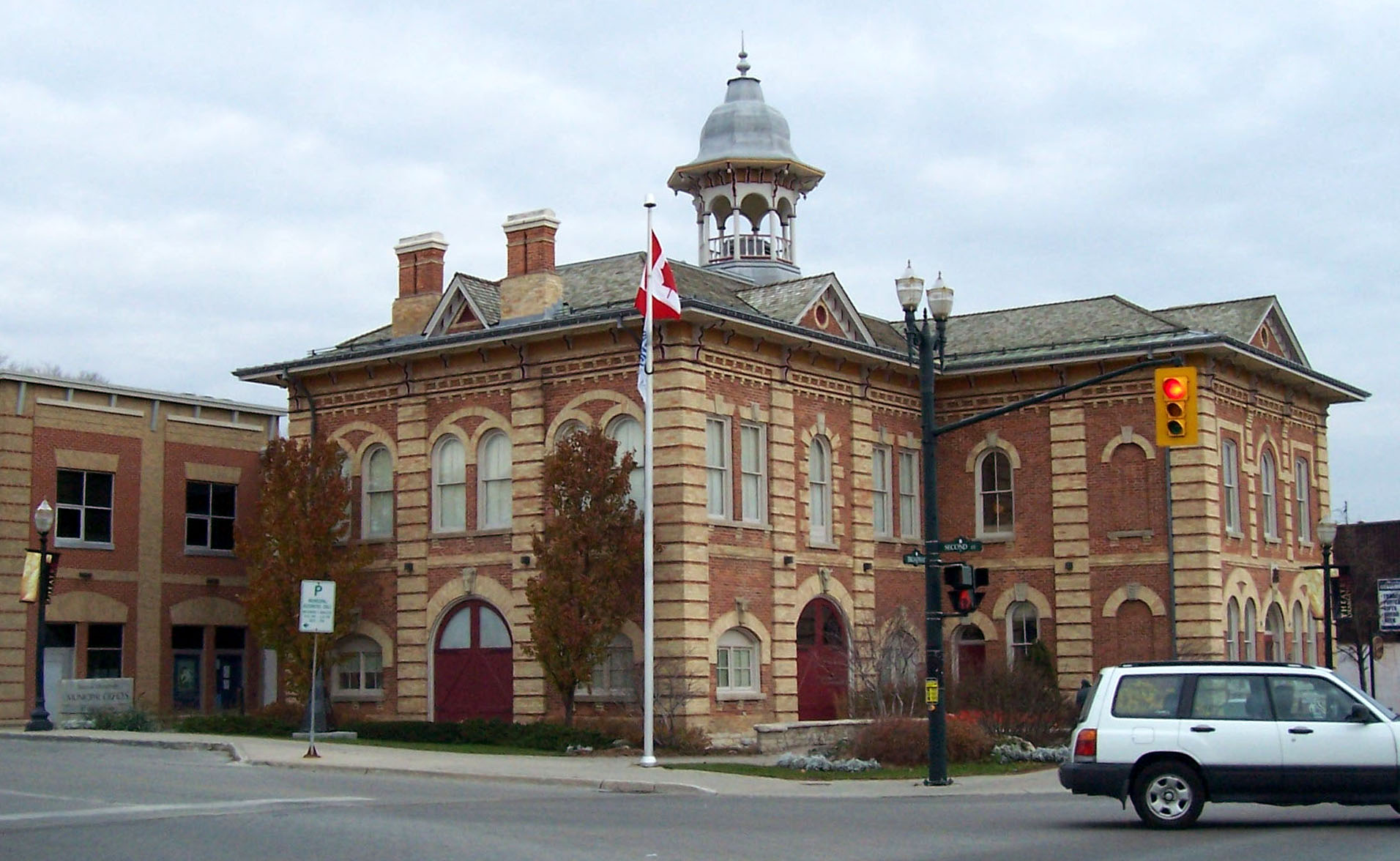
Orangeville Town Hall.

The main intersection in the heart of the town is Broadway (formerly Highway 9) and First Street. Highway 10 runs through Orangeville on its east side.

Beginning in 2005, a major roadwork project was initiated to resurface Broadway through Orangeville. The downtown section was completed in early 2006, with extensive work still to be done on the west end in late 2006. In conjunction with this project, there was another one completed in late 2006 that involved building large planters in the middle of Broadway through the downtown section between First and Third Streets (West - East). The project was controversial, as safety concerns had been raised by the fire department because the new concrete planters in the middle of the road have made the rights of way too narrow for fire trucks to properly set up in case of a fire in a downtown building.

A section of County Road 109, often referred to as the "Orangeville bypass", is a bypass opened in 2005, running east–west connecting Highway 10 with a pre-existing section of County Road 109 that was formerly Highway 9 running west out of town. Much of the eastern stretch runs through the Town of Caledon, but officially enters Orangeville at the Townline Road intersection, where it is named Riddell Road.

Orangeville Transit is the town's public transit system, and there is a commuter GO Transit bus service to Brampton. In 2023, Orangeville Transit introduced a two-year pilot program of free public transport under which no fares were collected on any of its routes within the town. In 2024 the town announced the pilot program would continue until at least 2027. Orangeville became the largest town or city in Canada with free public transport.

In the early 1990s, preliminary plans were drawn up for GO Transit passenger rail service to Orangeville. However, it never got past the drawing board. Industries in Orangeville were served by the Orangeville Brampton Railway, which purchased 55 kilometres (34 mi) of surplus track from the Canadian Pacific Railway. The railway connected with the CPR in Mississauga, and also serviced customers in Brampton to the south. From 2004 to 2018, a tourist train was operated on weekends in summer months. The last train out of Orangeville was December 17, 2021.

In 1906, survey work was underway for an electric railway line which would serve Orangeville, to be called the Huron and Ontario Electric Railway. The planned 150 kilometres (93 mi) line would have connected Orangeville with Goderich, Ontario. The line was proposed during a period where electric railways was popular in Ontario but many would end up in the hands of Ontario Hydro in the 1930s or fail. Like the 1902 Ontario West Shore Railway this line was never built.

== Education ==
Upper Grand District School Board operates secular anglophone public schools. The Dufferin-Peel Catholic District School Board operates anglophone catholic public schools. The Conseil scolaire Viamonde operates secular francophone schools serving the area. The Conseil scolaire de district catholique Centre-Sud operates catholic francophone schools serving the area.

There are currently eleven public and separate elementary schools in Orangeville: Credit Meadows, Mono Amaranth, Montgomery Village, Parkinson Centennial, Princess Elizabeth, Princess Margaret, St. Andrew's RC, St. Benedict's RC, St. Peter's RC, Island Lake Public School and Spencer Avenue Elementary. Along with these publicly funded schools, there are several private schools in the area: Headwater Hills Montessori School, Dufferin Area Christian School, Hillcrest Private School, The Maples Academy (IB World School), Orangeville Christian School.

A French elementary school named L'École élémentaire de Quatre-rivièrs (translated as "Four Rivers Elementary School") currently resides in the old Springbrook Elementary building despite the reason for closing the school being 'structural' problems. Most of these problems are said to be the result of 'improper foundation for the area' as the school was built upon a swamp. (Note: Because of this the intermediate (grade 7-8) yard area is known to gain a large pond in the spring, about 1 1/2 feet (45.7 cm) deep at the deepest point. This pond is referred to as Springbrook Lake by students and staff. A second smaller pond, only about 1 foot (30.5 cm) at its very deepest, appears in the primary (grades 1-3) yard. This is referred to as Springbrook Pond.) It had been used as a holding school for other schools including Island Lake, Montgomery Village, and Princess Margaret, while repairs, renovations, rebuilds and construction were completed.

There are two secondary schools within the boundaries of Orangeville: Westside Secondary School and Orangeville District Secondary School (ODSS). A catholic secondary school Robert F. Hall Catholic Secondary School, despite being within the Region of Peel, draws around 1,000 students from Orangeville and elsewhere in Dufferin County.

Humber College had offered full-time programs at the Alder Street arena beginning in 2007. After 15 years of operation, the campus closed on June 15, 2021.

Georgian College currently owns and operates a campus located at 22 Centennial Road, offering full-time and part-time courses. It is also delivering employment programs and services out of a location on 51 Townline.

== Media ==
There are two local newspapers based in Orangeville, the Orangeville Citizen and the Orangeville Banner.

Two radio stations are licensed to Orangeville, adult album alternative CKMO-FM (101.5 IndieFM) and dance CIDC-FM (Z103.5). CKMO launched in 2015 and broadcasts from studios in downtown Orangeville. CIDC has historically targeted the broader Greater Toronto Area as a rimshot, and has usually marketed itself as a Toronto station (having moved its tower closer to the city, and operating from studios in Etobicoke) rather than operate as an Orangeville-specific outlet. It faced reprimands from the CRTC in 2016 for not regularly broadcasting news and information content of specific relevance to Orangeville.

Until June 2005, Rogers TV maintained its Peel North studio and production facility at 98 C-Line. The facility was closed to allow for expansion of the Peel North headend. Today, Rogers TV has a studio and production facility located at 70 C-line.

== Notable people ==
- Nana Attakora, soccer player, Oakland Roots SC of the National Independent Soccer Association
- Keith Beavers, Olympic swimmer (2004 and 2008)
- Sarah Bonikowsky, Olympic rower (2008)
- Ryan Cooley, actor, portrayed J.T. Yorke on Degrassi: The Next Generation
- Nick Cvjetkovich, professional wrestler better known as Kizarny in WWE and Sinn in TNA
- Robertson Davies, author, died in December 1995 at Orangeville
- Dvbbs, Canadian production duo
- Adam Copeland, professional wrestler and actor, WWE Hall of Famer, better known by the ring name Edge
- Dan Ellis, former NHL goalie
- Laurie Graham, represented Canada at three Olympic games in downhill skiing and won six World Cup races
- Karen Knox, actor and director
- Logan McGuinness (born Logan Cotton), professional boxer, former North American Boxing Association Featherweight Champion, NABA Super Featherweight Champion, NABA Lightweight Champion
- Al Pilcher, Olympic cross-country skier (1988 and 1992)
- Jason Reso, professional wrestler, WWE and TNA World Champion, better known by the ring name Christian Cage
- Brett Ritchie, professional ice hockey player
- Nick Ritchie, professional ice hockey player
- Prabmeet Sarkaria, Ontario Minister of Transport

Orangeville has produced a number of notable lacrosse players, including:

- Bruce Codd
- Pat Coyle, 2002 NLL Defensive Player of the Year, NLL Hall of Famer
- Evan Kirk, 2016 NLL Goaltender of the Year
- Rusty Kruger
- Brodie Merrill, 2006 NLL Rookie of the Year and NLL Defensive Player of the Year, 2009, 2010, 2017 NLL Transition Player of the Year
- Brandon Miller
- Nick Rose, 2024 NLL Goaltender of the Year, 2024 World Lacrosse Box Championships gold medallist
- Sanderson family, including Terry (2015 NLL GM of the Year, NLL Hall of Famer), Nathan, Josh (NLL Hall of Famer), Phil, and Chris
- Dillon Ward, 2017 NLL Goaltender of the Year, MVP of 2014 World Lacrosse Championships, 2022 NLL Finals MVP
