= Noki =

Noki may refer to:

- Noki, Angola, a community on the Congo River in Angola's Zaire province
- Noki, a video game character in Super Mario Sunshine
- Noki (software), a commercial utility for extracting data from Nokia phones
- iNoki, an iPhone version of the Noki software
- Dassie rat, a species of Rodentia

== See also ==
- Gnocchi
