= Matias Rueda =

Argentine boxer

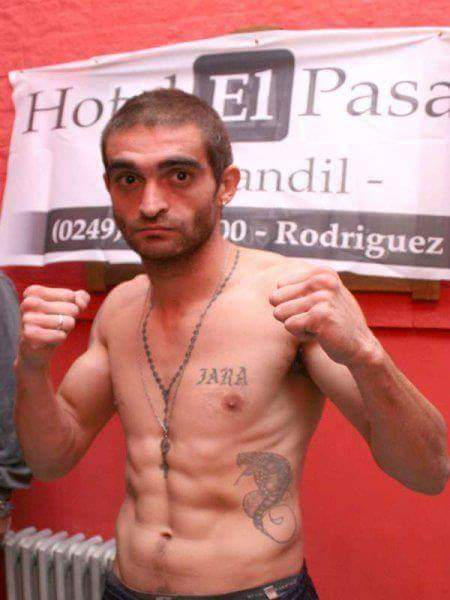
- Rueda in 2013

Personal information
- Nicknames: La Cobrita (The Cobra); The Terminator
- Born: Matías Carlos Adrían Rueda; 15 April 1988 (age 38) Tandil, Buenos Aires, Argentina
- Height: 5 ft 6 in (168 cm)
- Weight: Featherweight; Super featherweight; Lightweight

Boxing career
- Reach: 70 1/2 in (179 cm)
- Stance: Orthodox

Boxing record
- Total fights: 41
- Wins: 38
- Win by KO: 32
- Losses: 3

Matías Carlos Adrían Rueda (born 15 April 1988) is an Argentine professional boxer who challenged for the WBO featherweight title in 2016. At national level, he held the Argentine featherweight title from 2013 to 2016.

== Professional career ==
=== WBO Latino Featherweight champion ===
He won the title in the state of vacancy on 21 June 2013 to the noquear technically in the round 3 to the bonaerense Juan Ramón Solís in Merlo.

His first defense was on 9 August 2013 in front of Diego Tejerina litigates in which Rueda would win by TKO in the round 2.

His second defense was on 22 November 2014 in front of Gabriel Ovejero, fight that films won in the round 3 with a big KO.

His third defense was on 25 January 2015 in front of Guillermo Soloppi, fight that films won in the round 3 by KO with a hook to the liver.

His fourth defense was on 25 April 2015 in front of the Colombian Walter Estrada being this his second international fight, fight that films won with a TKO in the round 4.

His fifth defense was on 11 July 2015 in front of the Nicaraguan Jimmy Aburto in which wheel would finish retaining the title with a TKO in the round 5.

His sixth defense was 2 April 2016 to Néstor Paniagua, in which Rueda would emerge victorious by KO hook to the liver in round 3 in the city of Dolores.

=== ABF Argentine Featherweight title ===
On 18 October 2013 conquest the Title ABF of the Weigh feather in state of vacancy in front of Diego Tejerina, fight that would win Wheel in the round 6 by technical knockout.

On 8 March 2014 makes his first defense of the Title in front of Jorge Luis Rodríguez litigates that Rueda won by technical knockout in the round 7.

=== South American Featherweight title ===
On 16 January 2016 conquest the Title South American of the featherweight in state of vacancy in front of vacancy in front of Leandro Mendes Pinto, Rueda winning by knockout in the eighth round.

=== WBO Featherweight title ===
Rueda then faced #1 contender Oscar Valdez for the Vacant WBO Featherweight title. Rueda was knocked out and has never been the same.

== Professional boxing record ==
41 fights	38 wins	3 losses
By knockout	32	2
By decision	6	1

No.	Result	Record	Opponent	Type	Rd., Time	Date	Location	Notes
41	Loss	38–3	(Belarus) Dzmitry Asanau	TKO	5 (10), 2:58	2024-11-07	Montreal Casino, Montreal, Canada	Won vacant WBC Continental Americas lightweight title
40	Win	38–2	(Argentina) Diego Alberto Chaves	UD	6	2023-10-06	Club Union y Progreso, Tandil, Argentina	
39	Loss	37–2	(Australia) Liam Wilson	UD	10	2022-06-29	Brisbane Convention & Exhibition Centre, Brisbane, Australia	For vacant WBO International super featherweight title
38	Win	37–1	(Argentina) Miguel German Acosta	SD	10	2021-12-11	Polideportivo General Paz, Cordoba, Argentina	
37	Win	36–1	(Argentina) Martin Orlando Rocha	KO	4 (6)	2021-08-14	Monaco Hotel & Resort, Villa Carlos Paz, Argentina	
36	Win	35–1	(Argentina) Claudio Fernando Echegaray	KO	4 (10), 2:38	2021-02-06	Monaco Hotel & Resort, Villa Carlos Paz, Argentina	Won vacant WBO Latino super featherweight title
35	Win	34–1	(Argentina) Fabian Oscar Orosco	TKO	8 (10)	2020-02-15	Arena Villa Carlos Paz, Villa Carlos Paz, Argentina	
34	Win	33–1	(Argentina) Julian Evaristo Aristule	KO	2 (10)	2019-11-09	Monaco Hotel & Resort, Villa Carlos Paz, Argentina	
33	Win	32–1	(Argentina) Emiliano Dominguez	SD	10	2019-02-16	Club Atletico Central Argentino, Rio Cuarto, Argentina	
32	Win	31–1	(Argentina) Miguel Cesario Antin	KO	3 (12)	2018-07-28	Monaco Hotel & Resort, Villa Carlos Paz, Argentina	
31	Win	30–1	(Argentina) Fabian Oscar Orosco	KO	3 (10)	2018-05-19	Everton Club, Coronel Moldes, Argentina	
30	Win	29–1	(Argentina) Guillermo Osvaldo Soloppi	TKO	4 (10)	2017-11-18	Estadio F.A.B., Buenos Aires, Argentina	
29	Win	28–1	(Brazil) Aldimar Silva	TKO	2 (10)	2017-07-29	Gimnasio Instituto Corazón de María, Chascomus, Argentina	
28	Win	27–1	(Argentina) Daniel Brizuela	TKO	1 (10)	2016-11-05	Club Union y Progreso, Tandil, Argentina	Retained ABF Argentine featherweight title
27	Loss	26–1	(Mexico) Óscar Valdez	TKO	2 (12), 2:18	2016-07-23	(United States) MGM Grand Garden Arena, Las Vegas, Nevada, US	For vacant WBO featherweight title
26	Win	26–0	(Argentina) Néstor Paniagua	KO	3 (10), 2:02	2016-04-02	Estadio Arturo Umberto Illia, Dolores, Argentina	Retained WBO Latino featherweight title
25	Win	25–0	(Brazil) Leandro Mendes Pinto	KO	8 (12)	2016-01-16	Club Union y Progreso, Tandil, Argentina	Won vacant South American featherweight title
24	Win	24–0	(Colombia) Manuel de los Reyes Herrera	KO	3 (6), 1:24	2015-10-23	(United States) A La Carte Event Pavilion, Tampa, Florida, US	
23	Win	23–0	(Nicaragua) Jimmy Aburto	TKO	5 (10)	2015-07-11	Club Union y Progreso, Tandil, Argentina	Retained WBO Latino featherweight title
22	Win	22–0	(Colombia) Walter Estrada	TKO	4 (10)	2015-04-25	Club Union y Progreso, Tandil, Argentina	Retained WBO Latino featherweight title
21	Win	21–0	(Argentina) Guillermo Osvaldo Soloppi	KO	3 (10), 2:07	2015-01-25	Palacio de Los Deportes, Mar del Plata, Argentina	Retained WBO Latino featherweight title
20	Win	20–0	(Argentina) Gabriel Gustavo Ovejero	KO	3 (10)	2014-11-22	Club Social y Cultural El Cruce, Malvinas Argentinas, Argentina	Retained WBO Latino featherweight title
19	Win	19–0	(Argentina) Roberto Joaquin Iturra	KO	4 (10), 2:37	2014-08-30	Club Ferro Carril Oeste, Merlo, Argentina	
18	Win	18–0	(Argentina) Claudio Rosendo Tapia	TKO	3 (10)	2014-05-10	Club Union y Progreso, Tandil, Argentina	
17	Win	17–0	(Argentina) Jorge Luis Rodríguez	TKO	7 (10)	2014-03-08	Club Union y Progreso, Tandil, Argentina	Retained ABF Argentine featherweight title
16	Win	16–0	(Argentina) Diego Herminio Alejandro Sañanco	UD	10 (10)	2013-12-06	Club Union y Progreso, Tandil, Argentina	
15	Win	15–0	(Argentina) Diego Daniel Tejerina	TKO	6 (10)	2013-10-18	Sociedad de Fomento 12 de Octubre, San Martín, Argentina	Won the vacant ABF Argentine featherweight title
14	Win	14–0	(Paraguay) Ramón Elizer Esperanza	KO	4 (10)	2013-09-07	Centro Cultural Universitario, Tandil, Argentina	
13	Win	13–0	(Argentina) Diego Daniel Tejerina	TKO	2 (10), 2:21	2013-08-09	Auditorio Presidente Néstor Kirchner, Mercado Central, Tapiales, Argentina	Retained WBO Latino featherweight title
12	Win	12–0	(Argentina) Juan Ramón Solís	TKO	3 (10), 1:00	2013-06-21	Club Ferro Carril Oeste, Merlo, Argentina	Won the vacant WBO Latino featherweight title
11	Win	11–0	(Argentina) Ramón Armando Torres	KO	5 (10)	2013-03-23	Club Social y Cultural El Cruce, Malvinas Argentinas, Argentina	
10	Win	10–0	(Argentina) Juan Carlos Rodríguez	KO	1 (6)	2013-02-09	Club Defensa Tandil, Tandil, Argentina	
9	Win	9–0	(Argentina) Sergio Alejandro Blanco	RTD	3 (4), 3:00	2013-01-12	Club Social y Cultural El Cruce, Malvinas Argentinas, Argentina	
8	Win	8–0	(Argentina) Maximiliano Ezequiel Méndez	KO	4 (6)	2012-11-24	Club Defensa Tandil, Tandil, Argentina	
7	Win	7–0	(Argentina) Maximiliano Ezequiel Méndez	PTS	4 (4)	2012-09-22	Luna Park, Buenos Aires, Argentina	
6	Win	6–0	(Argentina) Lucas Rafael Báez	KO	2 (6), 0:35	2012-09-08	Club Defensa Tandil, Tandil, Argentina	
5	Win	5–0	(Argentina) Román Rubén Reinoso	KO	1 (4), 2:51	2012-07-13	Estadio F.A.B, Buenos Aires, Argentina	
4	Win	4–0	(Argentina) Sergio Blas Gómez	TKO	3 (4)	2012-06-15	Asociación Juvenil B. Traut, Las Flores, Argentina	
3	Win	3–0	(Argentina) Sergio Adrián Boltri	KO	3 (4)	2012-05-12	Club Defensa Tandil, Tandil, Argentina	
2	Win	2–0	(Argentina) Diego Alberto Chaves	DQ	4 (4)	2012-03-10	Club Defensa Tandil, Tandil, Argentina	
1	Win	1–0	(Argentina) Alan David Toledo	KO	1 (4)	2011-12-10	Club Defensa Tandil, Tandil, Argentina	

== Recognitions ==
- 2015 World Boxing Organization Best Latin Boxer of the Year

Sporting positions
Regional boxing titles
Vacant Title last held by Orlando Cruz	WBO Latino featherweight champion 21 June 2013 – July 2016	Vacant Title next held by Adeilson Dos Santos
Vacant Title last held by Jesus Cuellar	Argentine featherweight champion 18 October 2013 – November 2017	Vacant Title next held by Hector Sarmiento
Vacant Title last held by Roman Reinoso	South American featherweight champion 16 January 2016 – April 2016	Vacant Title next held by Alan Castillo
