= Nokia Suite =

Application to connect Nokia devices to Windows computers

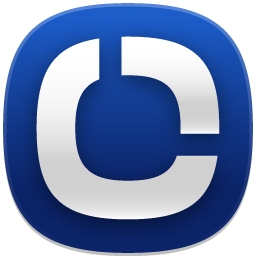

- Screenshot of Nokia Suite 3.2.100
- Original author: Nokia
- Developer: Microsoft Mobile
- Final release: 3.8.54 / 19 November 2014
- Operating system: Microsoft Windows
- Platform: IA-32
- Size: 101 MB
- Available in: American English, British English, Czech, Dutch, Filipino, French, German, Hungarian, Italian, Malay, Norwegian, Russian, Spanish, Ukrainian and Vietnamese
- License: Freeware

Nokia Suite (formerly Nokia Ovi Suite) is an application for Nokia users to connect their devices with Microsoft Windows. The service was originally developed by Nokia but was subsequently taken over by Microsoft Mobile.

== Overview ==
Nokia Suite can synchronize contacts, calendar, messages, photos, videos and music between a Nokia device and a PC. Additionally, Nokia Suite can download country maps to Nokia devices, backup or restore the contents of devices, connect the PC to the Internet via mobile device (tethering) and update the device software.

Nokia Suite cannot be used with a Lumia or newer Nokia Asha phones.

This application is officially not available to download.

Nokia Suite is a replacement for Nokia PC Suite and was integrated with the Ovi brand of services. It was originally known as Nokia Ovi Suite but the name changed to Nokia Suite with the release of version 3.2.64 Beta in October 2011.

Nokia Suite does not have a lot of the features provided in Nokia PC Suite, such as organizing contacts by phone number or exporting into CSV format. It can, however, export contacts (including their groups) into Vcard format.

Nokia Suite can perform a complete backup of the phone contents to a single file with .nbu filename extension. The only official way to gain access to the contents of the backup is to restore it to the phone using Nokia Suite. However, there are third-party programs that can read these files with some success such as the shareware Noki.

== See also ==
- Noki
- Microsoft Software Updater
