= Dzmitry Asanau =

Belarusian boxer (born 1996)

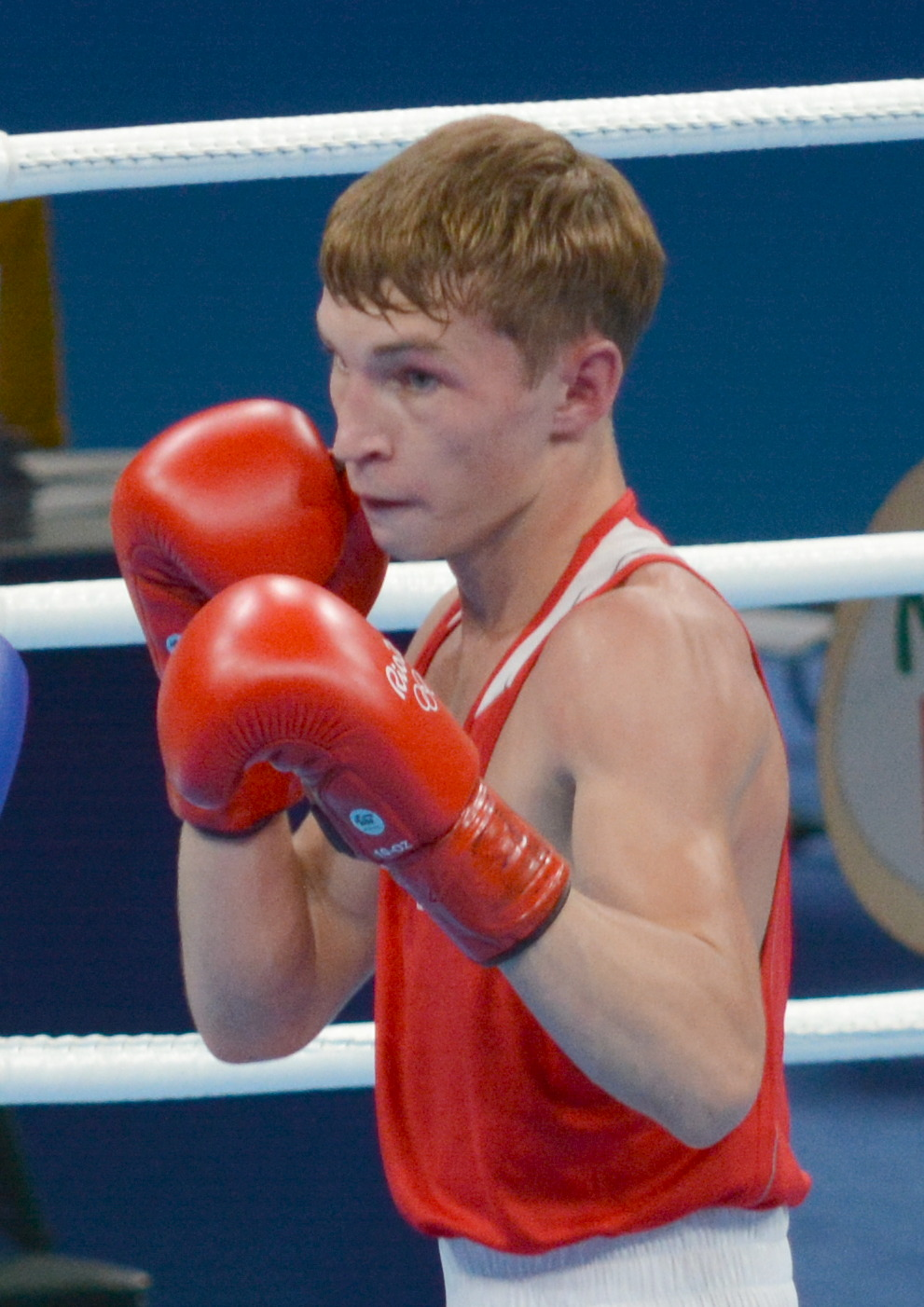
- Asanau at the 2016 Olympics

Personal information
- Nickname: The Wasp
- Nationality: Belarusian
- Born: Dzmitry Siarhieyevich Asanau; 18 May 1996 (age 30) Maladzyechna, Belarus
- Height: 176 cm (5 ft 9 in)
- Weight: Lightweight

Boxing career
- Stance: Orthodox

Boxing record
- Total fights: 14
- Wins: 14
- Win by KO: 7
- Losses: 0
Medal record
Men's amateur boxing
Representing Belarus
World Championships
Bronze medal – third place	2015 Doha	Bantamweight
European Games
Gold medal – first place	2019 Minsk	Lightweight
Silver medal – second place	2015 Baku	Bantamweight
World Military Boxing Championships
Gold medal – first place	2021 Moscow	Light welterweight

Dzmitry Siarhieyevich Asanau (Belarusian: Дзмітрый Сяргеевіч Асанаў; born 18 May 1996) is a Belarusian professional boxer. In 2015, he won a silver medal at the European Games and a bronze at the world championships. He competed in the bantamweight event at the 2016 Summer Olympics, but was eliminated in the round of 16.

== Professional boxing career ==
After winning his first seven fights as a professional, Asanau signed a promotional contract with Eye of the Tiger.

He defeated Matías Rueda via fifth-round technical knockout to win the vacant WBC Continental Americas lightweight title at Montreal Casino in Montreal, Canada, on 7 November 2024.

At the same venue, Asanau made the first defense of the title against Francesco Patera on 10 April 2025, securing a unanimous decision win.

He retained the title for a second time, and added the vacant IBF Inter-Continental lightweight championship to his collection, with a third-round knockout of Laid Douadi, again at Montreal Casino, on 4 September 2025.

Once more at Montreal Casino, Asanau is scheduled to face Claudio Daneff on 5 February 2026.

== Professional boxing record ==
14 fights	14 wins	0 losses
By knockout	7	0
By decision	7	0

No.	Result	Record	Opponent	Type	Round, time	Date	Location	Notes
14	Win	14–0	Luis Santana	UD	10	9 Oct 2026	Capitole de Quebec, Quebec City, Canada	Retained WBC Continental Americas and IBF Inter-Continental lightweight titles; Won NABF lightweight title
13	Win	13–0	Roger Gutiérrez	TKO	6 (10), 1:51	4 Jun 2026	Montreal Casino, Montreal, Canada	Retained WBC Continental Americas and IBF Inter-Continental lightweight titles
12	Win	12–0	Carlos Ramos	RTD	7 (10), 3:00	5 Feb 2026	Montreal Casino, Montreal, Canada	Retained WBC Continental Americas lightweight title
11	Win	11–0	Laid Douadi	KO	3 (10), 3:00	4 Sep 2025	Montreal Casino, Montreal, Canada	Retained WBC Continental Americas lightweight title; Won vacant IBF Inter-Continental lightweight title
10	Win	10–0	Francesco Patera	UD	10	10 Apr 2025	Montreal Casino, Montreal, Canada	Retained WBC Continental Americas lightweight title
9	Win	9–0	Matías Rueda	TKO	5 (10), 2:58	7 Nov 2024	Montreal Casino, Montreal, Canada	Won vacant WBC Continental Americas lightweight title
8	Win	8–0	Gabriel Camejo	UD	8	17 Aug 2024	Videotron Centre, Quebec City, Canada	
7	Win	7–0	Cristian Avila	TKO	4 (8), 2:14	3 Jun 2023	Universum Gym, Hamburg, Germany	
6	Win	6–0	Lesther Lara	UD	8	4 Feb 2023	Friedrich-Ebert-Halle, Ludwigshafen, Germany	
5	Win	5–0	Ramiro Blanco	UD	8	5 Nov 2022	Rudolf Weber-Arena, Oberhausen, Germany	
4	Win	4–0	Robin Zamora	UD	8	10 Sep 2022	Universum Gym, Hamburg, Germany	
3	Win	3–0	Marcos Villasana	UD	8	21 May 2022	Edel-optics.de Arena, Wilhelmsburg, Hamburg, Germany	
2	Win	2–0	Daniel Ibarguen	TKO	3 (4), 2:20	23 Apr 2022	Universum Gym, Hamburg, Germany	
1	Win	1–0	Nestor Maradiaga	TKO	2 (4), 1:42	19 Feb 2022	Universum Gym, Hamburg, Germany	
