= Microsoft Kaizala =

Discontinued corporate mobile messaging app

- Developer: Microsoft
- Release: Android: 1.1.0718.3411/ June 29, 2013; 13 years ago, iOS: 1.133.107283511/ July 28, 2015; 11 years ago
- Written in: C#
- Operating system: Android, iOS
- Successor: Microsoft Teams
- Size: Android: 34.32 MB, iOS: 231.1 MB
- Available in: 35 languages
- List of languages English, Bengali, Croatian, Czech, Danish, Dutch, Finnish, French, German, Greek, Gujarati, Hindi, Hungarian, Indonesian, Italian, Japanese, Korean, Marathi, Norwegian Bokmål, Polish, Portuguese, Punjabi, Romanian, Russian, Simplified Chinese, Slovak, Spanish, Swedish, Tamil, Telugu, Thai, Traditional Chinese, Turkish, Ukrainian, Vietnamese
- License: Proprietary
- Website: Official Webpage

Microsoft Kaizala was a secure messaging and work management software application for collaboration among users inside and outside of organizations, including the ability to send and receive instant messages, coordinate tasks, and submit invoices. It was launched in India in 2017, thereafter expanded to 28 countries, and was launched globally in April 2019 as part of the Office 365 package. It was available internationally, except in a few countries as a free Android, iOS, and web application. Kai zala is a Marathi phrase (काय झालं) that means "What happened?"

== Overview ==
Microsoft Kaizala has been optimized to work on 2G networks to enable connectivity in remote locations and offers features with offline support. Kaizala users could assign jobs to their field employees, conduct surveys, share attachments and more, all within an easy-to-use application.

Microsoft Kaizala had seen a significant adoption among Indian organizations such as YES Bank, Apollo Telemedicine, Republic TV, United Phosphorus Limited and Kendriya Vidyalaya Sangathan. In addition, the Government of Andhra Pradesh was one of the first government organizations to use Microsoft Kaizala for real time governance. More than 30 government departments and over 70,000 users in the State Government used Microsoft Kaizala for day-to-day work.

In July 2019, Microsoft announced that Kaizala Pro's capabilities would be gradually adopted in Microsoft Teams over the next 12 to 18 months, and that Teams would eventually replace Kaizala as a single collaboration solution. As announced a year prior to its retirement, Kaizala was discontinued in favor of Teams on August 31, 2023.

== History ==
Microsoft Kaizala was initiated as a product under Microsoft Garage and was later fully integrated as a standalone product/Office 365. Corporate Vice President Rajiv Kumar, conceived the idea of the product for mobile phone users who are on the go, and rely on their phones to do much of their work. For over a year, he engaged himself with customers across the world to elicit their views on its functionality and obtained feedback. As chat applications and plugging-in of consumer technologies in organizations work-flows began taking primacy over other modes of communication, the infusion of points of view obtained from the feedback became central to the making of Kaizala. The Microsoft Office team in India learned through multiple interactions with focus groups and personal interviews that most businesses and individuals were not just mobile-first, but even mobile-only. They indeed wanted better mobile apps for their phones to perform three key functions – create content on the fly, manage contacts in a phone-based customer relationship management system, and have a shared, secure mobile environment for teams to collaborate.

Celebrating the first anniversary release of Kaizala through Microsoft Garage, CEO Satya Nadella announced the product in preview in the "Future Decoded", an event focused on India. In fact, Kaizala was launched as a Garage project on 22 February 2016. Andhra Pradesh government has begun using it by April 2016 for group communication among its officials during large-scale events. Kaizala was first used to effectively manage and coordinate a festival attended by 20 million people. This led to many other organizations within the country to begin using it.

With the growing digital payment culture in India, Microsoft introduced digital payments services in its social network app Kaizala. Payment integration enabled users to quickly send or receive money without leaving the app. Kaizala had seen a strong uptake across banking and financial services to help customers connect and collaborate. By integrating the payment of both organizations' mobile payment infrastructure services of Yes Bank and MobiKwik users could swiftly send or receive money. Microsoft Kaizala users would have the option to make P2P payments in one to one and group chat conversations via the MobiKwik wallet and via Yes Bank’s Unified Payment Interface (UPI) integration.

Kaizala expanded its operations in South Africa as part of enabling businesses to embrace the fourth industrial revolution and digitally transform their operations.

== Features ==
Microsoft Kaizala connected users with their employees, irrespective of their physical locations, helped collect data even from large groups, assimilated insights and generated automated reports. For ease in workplace coordination, task monitoring, assigning of jobs, performance tracking and scheduling of meetings could be handled through the App. Custom "actions" could be built based on business needs through open API systems.

- Surveys and polls
- Message broadcasts
- Workflow management
- Job and task assignments
- Power BI-based dashboard
- Extensibility through REST APIs
- Integration with third-party applications
- Controlled access and security features
- Quick on-boarding and group management
- Reports for visualizing productivity trends and performance

== See also ==
- Secure instant messaging
- Comparison of instant messaging clients
