= Scalado =

Swedish software company

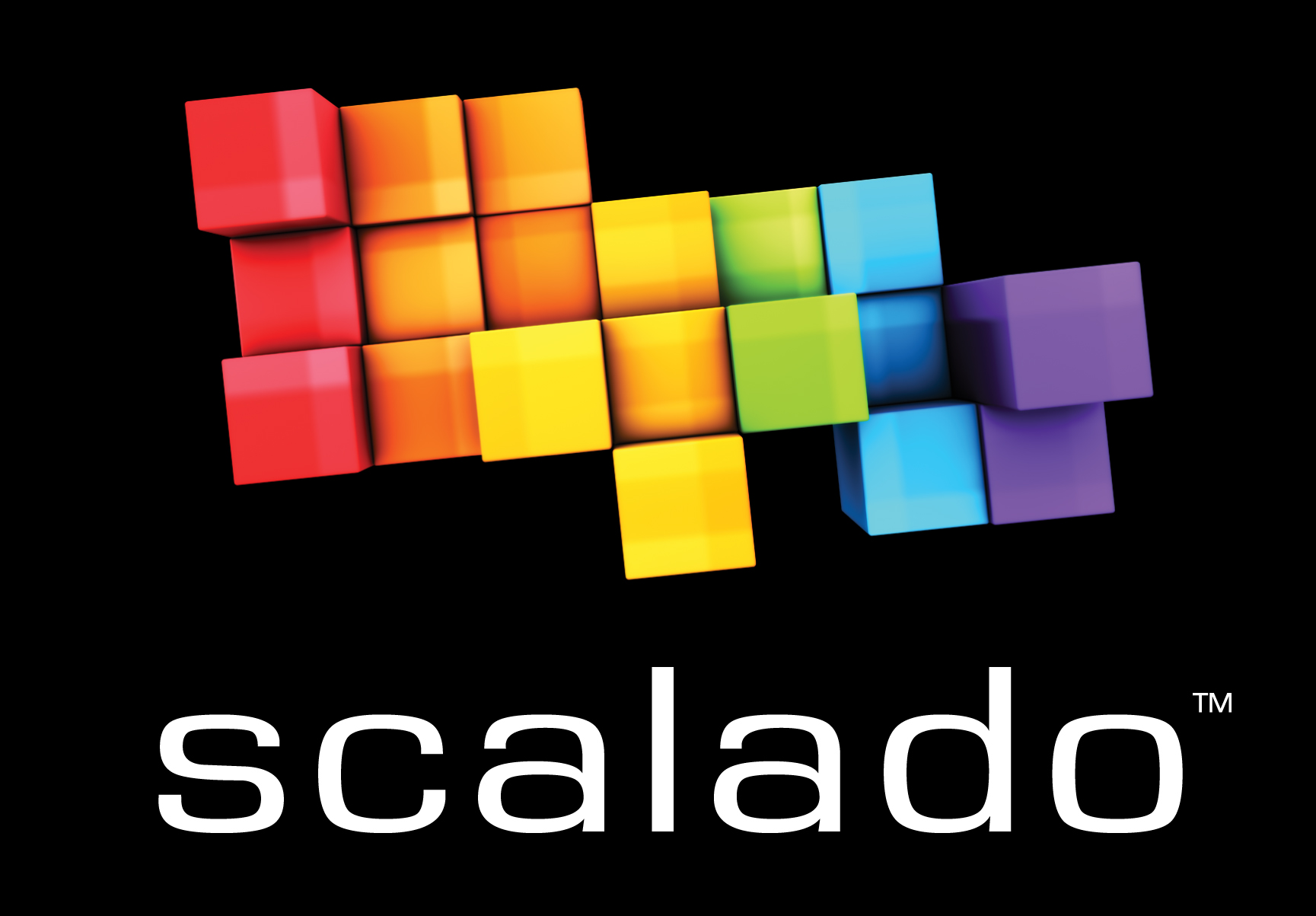
- Type: Private
- Industry: Imaging software Imaging technology Mobile imaging
- Founded: 2000
- Founder: Fadi Abbas; Pierre Elzouki; Maziar Jahanshahi; Sami Niemi
- Headquarters: Lund, Sweden
- Number of locations: Sweden (HQ), Korea, China, Taiwan, Singapore and United States
- Area served: Worldwide
- Website: http://www.scalado.com

Scalado was a provider of imaging technologies, applications and engineering services for the camera (phone) industry.

The company was a Swedish imaging software company that focused on the wireless device industry. Scalado's CAPS was embedded in more than a billion cellphone camera devices. Scalado was acquired by Nokia in 2012.

== History ==
Scalado was founded in 2000 at Ideon Science Park in Lund, Sweden by former students from Lund's University, Sami Niemi, Fadi Abbas, Maziar Jahanshahi and Pierre Elzouki (active until 2004). Scalado employed imaging specialists worldwide and was headquartered in Lund, Sweden.

The company had offices in Sweden (HQ), Korea, China, Hong Kong, Taiwan, Singapore and the United States.

== Technology ==
In 2010, Scalado technology was embedded in more than 930 million devices with a predicted annual growth of 500 million devices per year. Examples of its technologies was Scalado RAJpeg, Scalado SpeedTags and Scalado SpeedView.

During Blackberry World 2012 in Florida, Research in Motion revealed a demo of its upcoming new mobile os, BlackBerry 10, incorporating Scalado's time warp feature.

== Products ==
Scalado's software offered products in capturing, viewing and editing images. Examples of some of the imaging products Scalado provided its customers with: Scalado CAPS, Scalado PhotoFlow, Scalado Rewind, Scalado TimeWarp, Scalado Camera SDK, Scalado Album SDK, and Scalado Editor SDK. In 2012, Scalado also started producing mobile apps for the consumer market.

== Awards and recognition ==
2003 – Scalado was awarded by the European Commission with the European IST prize, Information Society Technologies (today called ICT-prize) in Copenhagen, Denmark. Scalado was given the award for its first ever imaging software, Scalado ImageZoom™.

2005 – Scalado won the Series 60 Challenge Awards in the category “Best Media/Music product of the year” for the PhotoTwister™ Series 60 application.

2007 – Scalado was awarded with ALBIHNS prize of innovation for the AutoRama™ technology, a panoramic image application.

2008 – At the Mobile Gala known as the Swedish “Mobile Oscars” in Stockholm, Sweden, Scalado won the category for “Company of the year”.

2009 – On Deloitte's list of “Sweden Technology Fast 50” Scalado was ranked as number seven with a growth of 1559% during 2004-2008.

On Deloitte's list of the 500 fastest growing companies in EMEA (Europe, Middle East and Africa), Scalado was listed as the 114 most expansive company with a five-year growth rate of 1476.10%.

2009 – Scalado wins at the Red Herring's Europe 100 awards, as the top 100 innovative companies across Europe.

2009 – Scalado is listed in the 100 Million Club.

2009 – Ernst & Young nominated Scalado's founders in the category of “Entrepreneur of the Year”. Scalado won the category “Best International Expansion 2009”.

2010 – Scalado makes the Deloitte's fast 50 and 500 lists yet again.

2010 – Scalado was nominated for the “Guldmusen” (the golden mouse) in the category “IT entrepreneur 2010”. The founders’ of this award are the Swedish magazines Affärsvärlden and Computer Sweden.

2010 – Scalado was nominated by the Swedish Trade Council for the Great Export Prize 2010.

2010 – Scalado has been nominated several times for the Export Hermes prize. In August 2010, Her Majesty the Queen Silvia of Sweden honored Scalado with the great Export Hermes prize at the Stockholm Chamber of Commerce.

2011 – Scalado becomes a "Gasell-company", an award given to the fastest growing most profitable companies over the last 3 years.

2011 – Scalado keeps making the Deloitte's fast 50 and 500 lists.

2011 – Scalado was nominated for "best pressroom" by MyNewsdesk.

2011 – Scalado is nominated for the "Cut the Wire" award.
