= Boxing at the 2015 European Games – Men's 56 kg =

Boxing competitions

The men's 56 kg boxing event at the 2015 European Games in Baku took place between 16 and 25 June.

== Results ==
Round of 32
Nicolae Andreiana (ROU)	3
Diego Ferrer (ESP)	0
Iurii Shestak (UKR)	1
Riccardo D'Andrea (ITA)	2
Kurt Walker (IRL)	1
Bakhtovar Nazirov (RUS)	2
Sylwester Kozlowski (POL)	1
Stefan Ivanov (BUL)	2
Qais Ashfaq (GBR)	3
Georgi Gogatishvili (GEO)	0

Round of 16
Tayfur Aliyev (AZE)	3
Nicolae Andreiana (ROU)	0
Matti Koota (FIN)	1
Frederik Jensen (DEN)	2
Samuel Kristohurry (FRA)	0
Riccardo D'Andrea (ITA)	3
Bakhtovar Nazirov (RUS)	3
Veaceslav Gojan (MDA)	0
Aram Avagyan (ARM)	1
Stefan Ivanov (BUL)	2
Dzmitry Asanau (BLR)	w/o
Rexnildo Zeneli (ALB)
Márk Szőrös (HUN)	0
Omar El-Hag (GER)	3
Qais Ashfaq (GBR)	2
Selçuk Eker (TUR)	1

Quarterfinals
Tayfur Aliyev (AZE)	3
Frederik Jensen (DEN)	0
Riccardo D'Andrea (ITA)	0
Bakhtovar Nazirov (RUS)	3
Stefan Ivanov (BUL)	0
Dzmitry Asanau (BLR)	3
Omar El-Hag (GER)	0
Qais Ashfaq (GBR)	3

Semifinals
Tayfur Aliyev (AZE)	1
Bakhtovar Nazirov (RUS)	2
Dzmitry Asanau (BLR)	3
Qais Ashfaq (GBR)	0

Final
Bakhtovar Nazirov (RUS)	2
Dzmitry Asanau (BLR)	1
