= Nokia phones beta labs =

Service by Nokia

- Available in: English
- Owners: HMD Global (2017-present); Microsoft Mobile (2014-2015); Nokia (2007-2014)
- Commercial: Yes
- Launched: 16 April 2007 (as Nokia Beta Labs); 14 August 2014 (as Lumia Beta Apps); 25 October 2017 (as Nokia phones beta labs)
- Current status: Active

Nokia phones beta labs is a service in which beta software for Nokia smartphones are available for public download. The service was originally launched as Nokia Beta Labs in 2007 by Nokia for S60-based Symbian devices, and later for the company's Windows Phone-based Lumia line. After the sale of the Nokia mobile devices division to Microsoft, the website was renamed Lumia Beta Apps. It was discontinued in 2015. The service was revived by HMD Global in 2017 for Nokia Android smartphones, allowing members to test Android 8.0 Oreo beta.

== Overview ==
Nokia Beta Labs homepage in 2008

The applications provided by Beta Apps are in development, but are considered "mature" enough to be released in order to be tested by users worldwide. Anyone can submit feedback about applications, which goes to the development team. After a period of time, an application either "graduated", meaning it is released as a final version, or is removed from the site and placed in an archive.

The site facilitates beta applications being developed by Microsoft or select 3rd party developers for Lumia products. The applications are, of reasonably good quality, but may have rough edges and occasional service breaks, not commercialized yet, not guaranteed, and not officially supported, under active development, free of charge and not be used for commercial purposes

Applications may graduate to become commercial offerings, or they will be archived along with the lessons learnt based on user feedback.

== History ==
Beta Labs logo under Nokia

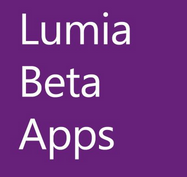
Lumia Beta Apps logo under Microsoft Mobile, the slogan was: Try what you like. Say what you think.

Nokia phones beta labs was launched as Nokia Beta Labs on 16 April 2007 only as a page linking to other Nokia beta applications, namely Sports Tracker, Wellness Diary and WidSets. On 13 August, Nokia employee Tommi Vilkamo announced the website's renovation and his role as the new Beta Labs manager on his blog.

After the rebranding Microsoft collecting feedback through UserVoice and has since launched several new applications such as Cinemagraph Beta and Gestures. Originally the site was operated by Nokia but Microsoft moved the development to a more feedback-orientated design in August 2014 to allow more users to add their feedback rather than just Nokia-developers. On 14 August 2014 it was announced the relocation of the Nokia Beta Labs website to a new site that host all new beta trials for Lumia apps.

Microsoft has discontinued the Nokia Camera Beta trial and re-released the Beta app as "Lumia Camera Classic" while implementing the new features in the Lumia Camera app, and has added OneDrive integration to Lumia Cinemagraph (formerly Nokia Cinemagraph) after first trialing it in the Lumia Beta Apps site. On 25 February 2015 Join Conference (previously Nokia Conference) was made public for all Windows Phones but republished under the Microsoft Garage and reduced the number of markets it was available in.

In May 2015 Microsoft released the Lumia Camera Beta app reminiscent to the Nokia Camera Beta app to test improvements, among the new features is the ability to select Office Lens from settings. Though these features are exclusive for newer PureView powered handsets, these devices include the Nokia Lumia 930, Nokia Lumia Icon, Nokia Lumia 1520, Microsoft Lumia 640, and Microsoft Lumia 640 XL.

On 22 July 2015 Microsoft launched a new version of the Lumia Creative Studio called Lumia Creative Studio Beta that added support for living images if the photographs were captured with the Lumia Camera.

On 11 September 2015 Microsoft announced that they would no longer accept any feedback via the Lumia Beta Apps site and would archive all older feedback and encouraged users to send feedback via the Windows Insider feedback application or through the Windows Phone Store, despite the discontinuation of the website no Lumia Beta App would be immediately removed from the store.

Nokia Beta Labs was reintroduced for Android-based Nokia smartphones in 2017 by HMD Global as Nokia phones beta labs.

== See also ==
- Microsoft Lumia
- Microsoft Mobile
- Lumia imaging apps
- Microsoft Mobile Services
