= Logan McGuinness =

Canadian Boxer

Personal information
- Nickname: Cotton
- Born: Logan Cotton McGuinness; September 4, 1987 (age 39) Ontario, Canada
- Height: 5 ft 8 in (1.73 m)
- Weight: Super Featherweight

Boxing career
- Reach: 69 in (175 cm)
- Stance: Orthodox

Boxing record
- Total fights: 28
- Wins: 25
- Win by KO: 12
- Losses: 1
- Draws: 2

Logan McGuinness (born Logan Cotton, September 4, 1987) is a Canadian professional boxer in the Super Featherweight class. He is a local favorite amongst the community in Ontario. He fights out of Orangeville.

== Early career ==
Logan started boxing at 14 in order to stop being bullied at school. One day he followed his older brother, Chandler, to the Big Tyme Gym in Orangeville and he immediately fell in love with it.

== Professional career ==
=== Super Featherweight ===
June 24, 2011 McGuinness earned a hard-fought win by 10-round decision over another tough fighter, former Mexican Pacific Coast title-holder Daniel Ruiz to win the NABA Lightweight title.

On October 22, 2011 at the Hershey Centre, McGuinness stopped Gaudet by TKO at 1 :56 of the eleventh round for the NABA super featherweight title.

On September 24, 2013 at Casino Rama, McGuinness won a 12-round unanimous decision over Sergio Carlos Santillan to win the vacant NABA Featherweight title, and become the first ever 3 division NABA Champion.

19 Wins (9 knockouts, 8 decisions), 0 Losses, 1 Draw(s)
Res.	Record	Opponent	Type	Rd., Time	Date	Location	Notes
Win	20–0–1	(Argentina) Sergio Carlos Santillan	UD	12 (12)	2013-09-14	Casino Rama, Rama, Ontario, Canada	
Win	19–0–1	(Dominican Republic) Carlos Manuel Reyes	UD	10 (10)	2012-12-14	Bell Centre, Montreal, Quebec, Canada	
Win	18–0–1		2012-09-15	Hershey Centre, Mississauga, Ontario, Canada			
Win	17–0–1	(The Bahamas) Meacher Major	TKO	2 (12)	2012-05-12	Hershey Centre, Mississauga, Ontario, Canada	Retained NABA Super Featherweight title.
Win	16–0–1	(Canada) Benoit Gaudet	TKO	11 (12)	2011-10-22	Hershey Centre, Mississauga, Ontario, Canada	Won the vacant NABA Super Featherweight title.
Win	15-0-1	(Mexico) Daniel Ruiz	MD	10 (10)	2011-06-24	Hershey Centre, Mississauga, Ontario, Canada	Retained NABA Lightweight Title.
Win	14-0-1	(Dominican Republic) Hector Julio Avila	KO	4 (10)	2011-02-19	Hershey Centre, Mississauga, Ontario, Canada	Retained NABA Lightweight Title.
Win	13-0-1	2 (10)	2010-09-25	Hershey Centre, Mississauga, Ontario, Canada	Won vacant NABA Lightweight Title.		
Win	11-0-1	(Canada) Jorge Banos	TKO	1 (8)	2010-07-10	Hershey Centre, Mississauga, Ontario, Canada	
Draw	10-0-1	(Colombia) Walter Estrada	MD	6 (6)	2010-05-22	(United States) Mohegan Sun Casino, Uncansville, Connecticut	
Win	10-0	(Mexico) Pedro Navarrete	UD	8 (8)	2010-03-06	Montreal Casino, Montreal, Quebec, Canada	
Win	9-0	(Mexico) Cesar Soriano	UD	8 (8)	2009-12-05	Montreal Casino, Montreal, Quebec, Canada	
Win	8-0	(Mexico) Hugo Pacheco	KO	4 (6)	2009-10-16	Northland Agricom, Edmonton, Alberta, Canada	
Win	7-0	(Canada) Jorge banos	UD	4 (4)	2009-10-03	Montreal Casino, Montreal, Quebec, Canada	
Win	6-0	(Mexico) Cesar Figueroa	UD	4 (4)	2009-04-04	Montreal Casino, Montreal, Quebec, Canada	
Win	5-0	(Canada) Jean Charlamagne	TKO	4 (4)	2009-03-07	Montreal Casino, Montreal, Quebec, Canada	
Win	4-0	(Poland) Marcin Kulba	TKO	3 (4)	2008-11-15	(Republic of Ireland) International Events Arena, Breaffy House Resort, Castlebar, Ireland	
Win	3-0	(United Kingdom) Sid Razak	PTS	4 (4)	2008-10-04	Norwich Showground, Norwich, United Kingdom	
Win	2-0	(Canada) Tim Watts	TKO	1 (6)	2008-08-15	Venue at River Cree, Enoch, Alberta, Canada	
Win	1-0	(Latvia) Juris Ivanovs	PTS	2 (6)	2008-07-19	(Republic of Ireland) University Arena, Limerick, Ireland	Professional debut

== Titles in boxing ==
Major Sanctioning Bodies:

Minor Sanctioning Bodies:

- NABA Featherweight Champion (126 lbs)
- NABA Super Featherweight Champion (130 lbs)
- NABA Lightweight Champion (135 lbs)
