= Microsoft Garage =

Programme within Microsoft

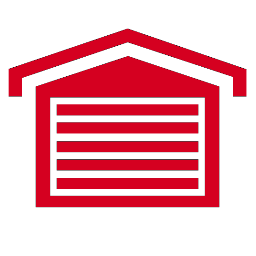
- Commercial?: Yes
- Owner: Microsoft
- Launched: 2009; 17 years ago
- Closed: October 19, 2026
- Status: Terminated

The Microsoft Garage was a Microsoft program that encouraged employees to work on projects about which they were passionate, despite having no relation to their primary function within the company. Employees from all divisions of Microsoft were free to take part in Microsoft Garage activities and small-scale innovation projects. The Microsoft Garage was a global program with locations on the main campus in Redmond, Washington, and several others spread all over the world, and a website that launched in October 2014 to share experimental projects with customers.

For project teams that wanted to move their ideas forward, Garage resources included collaboration with experts to help accelerate project development. These experts consulted with project teams who wanted to ship a trial through the Garage, sharing guidance on all aspects of project development including engineering, design, go-to-market, and analytics. Project teams owned their project from ideation to retirement — they designed, coded, buillt, released, and supported their project. These teams were as small as two and as large as twenty+ people. Teams that won the annual worldwide Hackathon, produced by The Garage, got to meet members of the top level leadership teams to discuss their project and receive direction.

== History ==
The Microsoft Garage originated in 2009 in Office Labs in Building 4 of Microsoft Redmond campus with Office Labs GM Chris Pratley, Quinn Hawkins, Jennifer Michelstein and Joe Coplen. The name was coined by Quinn based on the fact that many tech companies were "started in a garage" and the term captured the notion of innovation and the start-up culture. The impetus was that Microsoft needed a safe space where employees could pursue ideas that they were passionate about, even ideas that were not part of their day job, or things that might fail fast. The Garage was originally called "The Office Garage" and was limited to projects focused on office worker productivity.

At the time of The Garage's founding, there were several other better-funded programs inside of Microsoft focused on grassroots innovation including IdeaExchange. These programs focused on having employees submit and vote on ideas with the highest-voted ideas receiving some level of funding. What differentiated The Garage was the slogan "Doers. Not Talkers." The premise of The Garage was that ideas were cheap and not that valuable, and that execution and prototyping were far more valuable. The Garage focused on supporting employees who were already building their projects and were willing to build it themselves vs. seeking funding.

The first Garage event was the "Garage Office Science Fair" where all employees, regardless of department, were invited to demo their projects to executives from the Microsoft Office group in Building 36. The next step was the creation of an internal email group and a series of bi-weekly events called "Stay Late And Code" (SLAC). Soon employees with projects not focused on office worker productivity asked if The Office Garage could be expanded to include other groups and Pratley agreed. However, rather than directly funding science fair or SLACs for groups outside of Office, The Garage would seek an internally champion within the business group to obtain funding from the group's executives. This meant that the leaders of the business group were financially invested in the success of The Garage and did more to support it. Bing was one of the first groups outside of Office to have a science fair. During this period Liane Donald and Jane Boise were the primary event organizers for The Garage. International expansion also happened organically. Engineer Sidharth Sehgal at Microsoft's Hyderabad campus began organizing SLACs in India and eventually secured funding for a Hyderabad science fair.

The first Garage space opened in July 2011 in Building 4. The space included a working/meeting space with two large working garage doors, a laser cutter and a 3D printer. In September 2011, The Garage helped publish its first Garage project to the general public: Mouse without Borders developed by Microsoft engineer Truong Do. Garage volunteers assisted Truong by designing and developing the installer and setup for Mouse without Borders. By the end of 2012, The Garage had 3,000 members, grassroots Garage chapters in ten locations around the world, and eight Garage Interest Groups (GIGs) including Makers, SQL, Surface, and Bing.

By mid-2013, there were more engineers getting involved, and — because of the emphasis on innovation and inspiration — the activities got the attention of leaders in what was then called the Technology & Research group. Eventually, The Garage moved under Jeff Ramos to be part of T&R in the Engineering Excellence group. There were resources to support “maker” activities and hands-on learning sessions for employees who wanted to experiment, and small “chapters” forming in engineering groups in Microsoft locations around the world. Throughout this period, The Garage continued to retain its identity as the place for pursuing ideas, being creative, and learning new things in an open environment. In late 2013, a dedicated Garage facility was built in Building 27 South on Redmond campus, and Garage activities like hackathons and hands-on coding sessions were occurring on a regular basis.

In early 2014, Satya Nadella, as the new Microsoft CEO, began to socialize the priority of having a “growth mindset.” Nadella had earlier shown interest in The Garage, and he held his first all-company meeting streamed from The Garage space in B27. Garage principles were well aligned to the growth mindset, so when the senior leadership team at Microsoft wanted to evolve the Company Meeting to align to their new vision and support culture change, a Garage-type hackathon seemed like it had potential as a company-wide event. By this time, The Garage — still focusing on hacking and innovating in free-form style — had a couple of vendors, an FTE program manager, and a team nearby who often helped when needed. They were running more planned and curated events in The Garage space as demand grew.

In July 2014, The Garage produced the first company-wide hackathon. It was an online and in-person event aimed at giving employees an opportunity to set aside time to work with others on a project that interested them. More than 11,000 people registered from 80 countries and created more than 3,000 projects.

In October 2014, The Garage launched the first set of lightweight, cross-platform apps created by incubation teams across the company. When the Microsoft Garage website was made public at www.microsoft.com/garage, there were 16 different applications available for various operating systems such as Google Android, Android Wear, iOS, Windows, Windows Phone and the Xbox One.

In February 2015 Microsoft launched a new wave of Android and Windows Phone applications, one of them previously being a Nokia application. Since then, some projects have been marked "experiment complete" and there continue to be applications and small-scale projects released through the Garage site.

In January 2016 Microsoft announced plans to open additional facilities in other Microsoft worldwide offices. The first Garage location outside Redmond opened in the downtown Vancouver, BC, office in June 2016. Next, a Garage facility was opened in Herzliya, Israel, in July 2016, followed by a site in the Microsoft Silicon Valley campus in August 2016, in Beijing, China, and Hyderabad, India, in March 2018, and Cambridge, Massachusetts, in April 2018. In Redmond as well as the global sites, the Garage is a key asset in accelerating culture change at Microsoft through programs and engagements that focus on a growth mindset, customer obsession, diversity and inclusion, and One Microsoft.

In October 2026, Microsoft announced internally that it was winding down The Garage as a centralized company-wide program after 17 years of operation. According to an internal FAQ, the impact on physical maker spaces across its 15 global hubs "will vary by location." The fate of the annual Microsoft Global Hackathon is also uncertain, with the FAQ stating that Microsoft is "reimagining the program."

== Notable projects and applications ==
=== Windows ===
- Mouse without borders is a Windows desktop application that allows users to control up to four different computers with a single keyboard and mouse set by acting similar to a virtual KVM switch.
- Snip is a screenshot-taking and annotation application that allows its users to make notations on captured screenshot images and make them into instructional videos.
- Plumbago is a notebook app designed for handwriting recognition and pen input, Plumbago comes from the Latin word for graphite and is also used for several species of flowering plants.

=== Hardware ===
- The 3-in-1 Dock for Surface Pro 3 was an ergonomic VESA-mounted portrait docking station developed during the first OneWeek hackathon which extended the 2-in-1 capabilities of the Surface tablet into a full desktop experience (hence '3-in-1'). The project was featured in a demo video on the Microsoft YouTube channel, PC World, and was made available as Microsoft's first open-source hardware product via GitHub. Ready-to-use kits were later made available worldwide on a web store.

=== Windows Phone ===
- Tetra Lockscreen was a Windows Phone application designed to work with the new lock screen APIs of Windows Phone 8.1, it had a stopwatch, weather, agenda, and maps widgets that provided information collected from the user's applications. Tetra Lockscreen served to show developers what they can do with Windows Phone's lock screen.
- Join Conference (previously Nokia Conference) was originally a Lumia Beta App designed by Nokia, when elevated to the Microsoft Garage it gained Cortana integration, it works by notifying users about their coming meetings in their calendars and shows the meeting IDs and PIN codes. Upon its re-released it was no longer a Lumia exclusive, but the available markets on which application was available was reduced to 17.
- SquadWatch is a friends tracker that allows users to see where their contacts are if they have registered with the service.
- DevSpace is a Visual Studio-based application that allows users to check the developments they were working on their desktops and notebooks from their mobile telephones, it uses a two-step verification process called OAUTH.
- InstaNote is an audio capturing note-taking application that allows users to capture an unlimited amount of sound but will only save 30 seconds of the selected recording, among its other features are tagging, task assignments and importing speaker identifications from the Outlook Calendar.
- Receipt Tracker is an expense tracking application that allows users to make a picture of their receipts and then the application will analyze it through Optical Character Recognition (OCR) and make a note of the expenses which can then be saved to Microsoft OneNote.

=== Android ===
- Torque is a voice-controlled application for Android and Android Wear that can conduct searches using Microsoft Bing. Torque was originally an exclusive for Android Wear but with version 2.5 it was released to Android phones and added local events and flight status to the functionality of the application.
- Next Lock Screen is an app launcher that shows users their latest appointments, most used applications, meetings, and shows the general agenda, Next Lock Screen has been criticized for offering the native lock screen capabilities of Android 5.0 rather than adding anything new.
- Journeys & Notes is a social application that connects users who are on the same route and use the same mode of transportation, and lets users write notes to each other.
- Your Weather is a Chinese application that provides the weather conditions of various cities in China, it was developed in close cooperation with Microsoft Research Asia and the China Meteorological Administration.
- Keyboard for Excel is a keyboard optimised for Microsoft Excel Mobile with a 10-key number layout for fast data entering and a tab key for easier navigation through tabs.
- Snap to Pin is an application that can save internet articles for later consumption through screenshots that users can then save to Microsoft OneNote or share them with the user's contacts via social network outlets.
- Parchi is a note-taking application similar to Evernote and Sticky Notes, the name Parchi comes from the Hindi word Parchi meaning "'small pieces of paper used for short notes", other than simple note taking users can use the application to colour notes and make notes searchable via hashtags and notes taken with Parchi can be shared via SMS or instant messaging services.
- Microsoft Launcher (Previously, Arrow Launcher) is a launcher app developed for instant access to users' favorite apps. It has separate pages for recent calls and messages, to-do lists, and widgets.
- Connections is a contact manager that aids in managing different types of relationships both personal and professional, over traditional contact managing it offers annotation and categorisation. Microsoft's Connections application was released in India on January 18, 2016
- Microsoft Mimicker is an alarm clock application that forces users to play a game or take a selfie of the user's mood in order for them to turn off the alarm.
- Microsoft Kaizala is a productivity app for Android designed to track a user's bills, jobs, and location, it also enables group conversation and communication by sharing relevant information and extracting value from a group chat.
- Sprightly is a business productivity app that allows users to create E-Cards, Price lists, Catalogs and Flyers for their companies.
- Hub Keyboard is a keyboard for Android devices that features language translation and the ability to search for documents and contacts from the keyboard itself.

=== Cross-platform ===
- Tossup is communications and scheduling tool for Android and iOS designed to combine SMS and web messaging for social meet-ups and integrates Yelp data, but the application has been criticized for essentially being "another" instant messaging service that offers no innovative features.
- Send is an emailing application originally launched for iPhone but was announced for Android and Windows Phone (and only available in the United States of America and Canada upon launch) that is designed towards short-form email messages and allows users to send emails without subject lines and is geared towards adding "key facts" and asking "quick questions" as opposed to more traditional means of emailing. Only messages generated in Send are visible in Send while for comparison messages in Microsoft's Outlook Mobile will display other emails as well as emails created in the Microsoft Send application.
- Invite is a meeting scheduling application originally launched for the iPhone but was immediately announced to launch on Android and Windows Phone at a later date. Invite allows users to suggest times that work best for them and will let attendees vote for the best time; attendees can be invited via email and may vote within the application or via a browser; after voting the user can send the date to all attendees' calendars.
- Twist is a photo conversations application originally launched for iPhone and iPad devices that acts as an instant messaging service but instead of using the traditional emoticon and emoji characters for visual communication users can use photographs.
- MyMoustache.net is a website that adds facial hair to pictures in the spirit of Movember; it is based on Microsoft's Project Oxford Face API.
- Fetch! is an iOS application and a website (what-dog.net) based on Microsoft's Project Oxford's APIs but unlike MyMoustache it can identify a Dog breed based on an uploaded picture.
- SandDance is a data visualisation site developed by the Microsoft Research Visualization and Interaction Team (VIBE) which can analyse and present it in a more visual way to make it easier to be understood by wider audiences. SandDance is both available as a web-tool and as an add on for Microsoft Power BI.
- maker.js is a JavaScript library for creating and sharing modular line drawings for CNC and laser cutters.

== See also ==
- Google's "20% Time" policy and Area 120
- Windows Insider
- Lumia Beta Apps
