= Orangeville Northmen =

Orangeville Northmen may refer to one of two teams that compete in Ontario Lacrosse Association Junior leagues:

- Orangeville Northmen Jr. A who compete in the OLA Junior A Lacrosse League
- Orangeville Northmen Jr. B who compete in the OLA Junior B Lacrosse League
