= Coronel Moldes =

Coordinates: 25°16′S 65°29′W

Coronel Moldes (Salta)
- Municipality and town
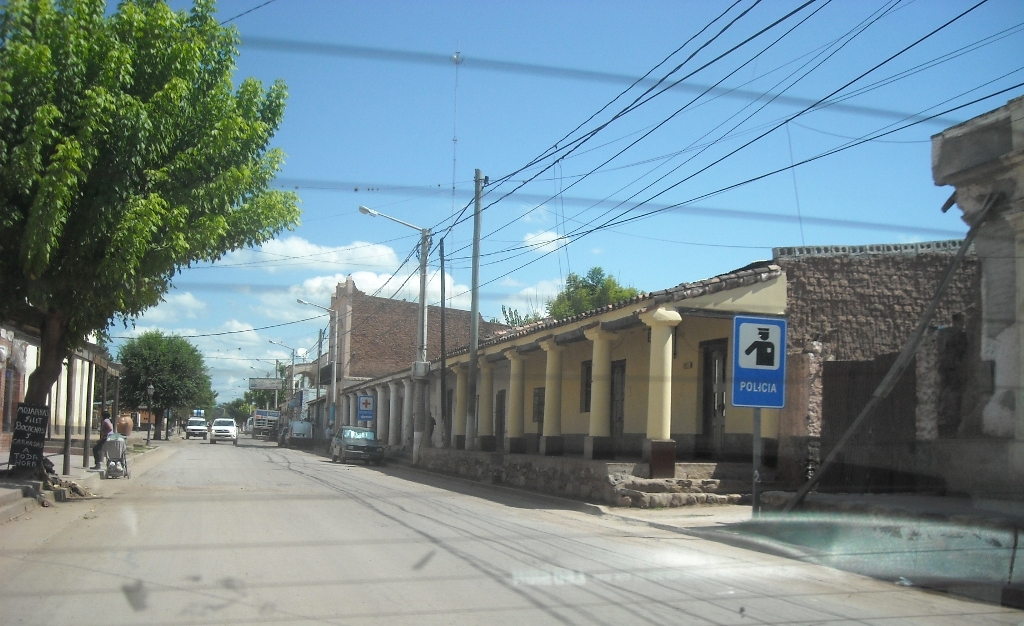
- Interactive map of Coronel Moldes (Salta)
- Country: Argentina
- Province: Salta Province
- Time zone: UTC−3 (ART)

Coronel Moldes (Salta) is a town and municipality in Salta Province in northwestern Argentina.

== Climate ==
Climate data for Coronel Moldes
Month	Jan	Feb	Mar	Apr	May	Jun	Jul	Aug	Sep	Oct	Nov	Dec	Year
Record high °C (°F)	37.3 (99.1)	39.5 (103.1)	35.5 (95.9)	33.7 (92.7)	34.0 (93.2)	31.5 (88.7)	37.0 (98.6)	35.8 (96.4)	38.0 (100.4)	39.3 (102.7)	40.9 (105.6)	39.5 (103.1)	40.9 (105.6)
Mean daily maximum °C (°F)	28.8 (83.8)	27.6 (81.7)	26.5 (79.7)	24.2 (75.6)	21.9 (71.4)	19.9 (67.8)	21.0 (69.8)	23.1 (73.6)	24.5 (76.1)	28.1 (82.6)	28.9 (84.0)	29.4 (84.9)	25.3 (77.5)
Daily mean °C (°F)	22.3 (72.1)	21.3 (70.3)	20.4 (68.7)	17.6 (63.7)	14.1 (57.4)	10.8 (51.4)	10.9 (51.6)	13.4 (56.1)	15.9 (60.6)	20.0 (68.0)	21.5 (70.7)	22.4 (72.3)	17.5 (63.5)
Mean daily minimum °C (°F)	17.1 (62.8)	16.1 (61.0)	15.6 (60.1)	12.0 (53.6)	7.4 (45.3)	3.2 (37.8)	2.6 (36.7)	4.4 (39.9)	7.1 (44.8)	11.6 (52.9)	14.4 (57.9)	16.3 (61.3)	10.7 (51.3)
Record low °C (°F)	8.1 (46.6)	7.6 (45.7)	7.1 (44.8)	2.2 (36.0)	−2.5 (27.5)	−5.2 (22.6)	−8.1 (17.4)	−7.3 (18.9)	−2.9 (26.8)	−0.4 (31.3)	1.6 (34.9)	7.2 (45.0)	−8.1 (17.4)
Average precipitation mm (inches)	139.0 (5.47)	114.9 (4.52)	101.9 (4.01)	30.4 (1.20)	7.5 (0.30)	1.5 (0.06)	3.7 (0.15)	6.8 (0.27)	8.0 (0.31)	25.3 (1.00)	46.0 (1.81)	109.8 (4.32)	594.6 (23.41)
Average relative humidity (%)	72	75	76	75	73	72	66	61	59	58	62	66	68
Source: Instituto Nacional de Tecnología Agropecuaria
