= MOSH (Nokia) =

- Website type: Software update Social networking Games, applications, themes, ringtones, audio, video, graphics, widgets, documents sharing
- Available in: English
- Owner: Nokia
- Launched: August 2007
- Current status: Closed

MOSH was a user defined distribution channel for mobile content initiated by Nokia. The name "MOSH" comes from "Mobilize and Share". The channel could have been used to both download and upload various content for mobile phones or other platforms. File types that were handled were: audio, images, applications, games, videos, documents.

A person could create an account on MOSH that comes with the following stats: creator (for content created by that person), collector (for the number of objects added to the collection in the account) and sharer (for uploading files that are not necessarily the work of that person). MOSH was known for having been filled with explicit and copyright-infringing content as it had no screening process.

MOSH was launched by Nokia in August 2007 and remained in Beta until its closure in 2009, by which time it had 137 million downloads. It was replaced by Ovi.
