= Club Nokia =

Mobile internet digital distribution portal

- Developer: Nokia
- Release: 1997
- Type: Mobile consumer internet portal and loyalty programme
- Website: ClubNokia

Club Nokia was a mobile internet digital distribution portal, operated by Nokia to provide special offers, paid-for ringtones, picture messages and game content directly to members. Following resistance from its mobile operator customers, Nokia partially closed the service and the brand became solely a consumer service and loyalty portal.

== History ==
Club Nokia was originally launched in 1997 to provide detailed product information and support about Nokia products. In 1999 Club Nokia was developed into an integral multi-channel personalised service accessible by WAP, SMS or the World Wide Web, spawning a new industry for the provision of mobile content. Consumers could join Club Nokia after buying a new Nokia device. To download content, users were required to purchase credits obtained from authorised Nokia dealerships. Content included additional game levels for e.g. Space Impact. The picture messaging service was launched in Finland in December 1999. In 2000, Amazon partnered with Nokia to enable purchasing of books from Amazon's catalogue via Club Nokia with WAP enabled mobile phones.

In August 2000, Nokia signed a deal with music publisher EMI to provide EMI-owned songs as ringtones, available from the Club Nokia website or by sending an SMS message. By November 2001, over 10 million consumers were subscribed to Club Nokia, and the enterprise was forecast to yield €1 billion in revenue by 2004. However, the EMI deal proved controversial as it placed Nokia in direct competition with the mobile operators' own branded portals, who relied on the booming ringtones market for revenue and were wary of Nokia gaining a mobile content monopoly through Club Nokia as Microsoft had done in computing software. Nokia argued customers used the carriers' mobile data to download content, but network operators remained resistant. As a result, Nokia announced in September 2004 that the service for selling ringtones would close down, never having become the commercial success it was forecast to be, and Club Nokia became solely a customer service, loyalty and news portal. On the back of investments made into Club Nokia, Nokia launched a new service Preminet to its operators, designed to distribute certified Java- and Symbian-based mobile software to make cell-phone applications easier to buy, sell, and distribute.

In late 2007 the Club Nokia service was rebranded "My Nokia". Nokia launched a new direct-to-consumer service in 2006 called Nokia Content Discoverer. The term "Club Nokia" was since re-used as the name of a concert venue in Los Angeles, which has now been renamed The Novo by Microsoft.

== See also ==
- Nokia Ovi
