= Nokia PC Suite =

Software to connect mobile devices to a PC

- Nokia PC Suite Main window
- Developer(s): Microsoft Mobile Oy (originally Nokia)
- Stable release: 7.1.180.94 ^{(See note)} / 26 June 2012; 12 years ago
- Operating system: Microsoft Windows
- Available in: Multilingual
- License: Proprietary freeware
- Website: www.nokia.com/global/support/product/nokia-pc-suite

Nokia PC Suite is a discontinued software package used to establish an interface between Nokia mobile devices and computers that run the Microsoft Windows operating system. Its first release was in 1997, originally called Nokia Data Suite. It was replaced by Nokia Suite and integrated into the Ovi service suite.

== Functionality ==
Nokia PC Suite can be used to transfer music, photos and applications. It can also be used to send Short Message Service (SMS) messages or act as a modem to connect the computer to the Internet. A mobile phone can be connected by USB, Bluetooth, or infrared.

Some older Nokia phones lack compatibility with later versions of the PC Suite. The official site supplies a table that matches each phone model with the most recent compatible version.

The latest version of Nokia PC Suite also contains several integrated applications, including the File Manager, Application Installer and "Nokia Communication Centre" data viewer. PC Suite users can also access on-device features (e.g. battery, memory and call handling), as well as Nokia PC Sync functionality.

== History ==
Some of the earliest devices that worked with Nokia Data Suite were the Nokia 3110, Nokia 6110 and Nokia 8110.

Nokia PC Suite has been unimproved, and was replaced by Nokia's next generation phone suite software, Nokia Suite, which supported other platforms in addition to Windows.

Nokia Suite drops the Lotus Notes client sync support which is present in Nokia PC Suite, instead requiring the user to use Lotus Notes' Traveler software. This must be installed and maintained on the Lotus Notes server; synchronization using PC Suite works from the phone to the user's PC, while synchronization on a phone which has Nokia Suite must use third-party software.

== Limitations ==
The backup feature in PC Suite uses a non-documented binary file format (.nbu), which can only be used to restore to a phone through the proprietary client. This means that the data can only be accessed by doing a restore to a working phone. Third-party programs (either commercial or free) can be used to read the file, but they greatly vary in the amount of information they can retrieve.

=== Nokia PC Sync ===
Nokia PC Sync
- Nokia PC Sync Icon
- Software supported by Nokia PC Sync
- Website: www.nokia.com/global/support/product/nokia-pc-suite

Nokia PC Sync allows the user to synchronize contacts, calendar, notes, to-do items, e-mails, bookmarks and files/folders between a supported Nokia mobile phone and:

- Microsoft Outlook 2000-2007 (Outlook 2010 x64 doesn't work with PC Suite at the moment, but its possible to sync via Nokia Suite (tested with 3.1 and E71). Office 2010 x86 does, but is not officially supported.)
- Microsoft Outlook Express / Windows Address Book
- Lotus Organizer 5.0-6.0
- Lotus Notes 5.x-8.x
- Microsoft Windows Vista Contacts
- Microsoft Windows Vista Calendar
- Microsoft Internet Explorer and Mozilla Firefox bookmarks
- Windows 2000/XP files/folders

PC Sync 7.0.9.2 contained a major bug, truncating street addresses which have been edited on the PC to run over more than one line, when synchronized back to the phone. It was possible to lose large parts of user's contacts' address information due to this issue.

=== Nokia Maps ===
Nokia PC Suite is unable to add or update maps and voices for the Nokia Maps application. This requires Nokia Map Loader or Nokia Suite; both require Microsoft Windows with the .NET Framework installed. However, it is possible to download maps for Nokia Maps without need for Nokia Map Loader or Nokia Suite by pointing a web browser directly to the map files on Nokia's Maps server.

== System requirements ==
- Available hard disk space: 250 MB (file size approx 25 MB)
- Operating system: Windows 7, Windows Vista and Windows XP Professional or Home (SP2 or higher)
- Connection methods: USB cable, Bluetooth, or Infrared
- Supported Bluetooth stacks (software):
  - Microsoft Windows Bluetooth (included in XP SP2, Vista and 7)
  - Toshiba Bluetooth stack for Windows XP/2000 v 4.0
  - WIDCOMM BTW 1.4, 3.0, 4.0, 5.0
  - IVT BlueSoleil Bluetooth stack
    - Windows XP/2000 use driver version 1.6.1.4
    - Nokia Nseries, Eseries, and 3250 phones require driver version 2.1.2.0

== Related products ==
- iNoki - an iPhone app for transfer Nokia PC Suite backup file to iPhone & iPad
- Noki - an explorer for Nokia PC Suite backup file (.nbu, .nfb, .nfc, .arc - sd card backup file and contacts.cdb - symbian contact database format)
