= WidSets =

- Developer: Nokia
- Release: October 2006
- Stable release: 2.0.0 / May 2008
- Operating system: Java ME (MIDP 2.0)
- Platform: Mobile phones
- Successor: Ovi Store
- Type: Widget engine, mobile runtime environment
- License: Proprietary

WidSets is a mobile runtime technology, and a mobile service powered by the said technology, based on the Java MIDP 2.0 platform, from the Finnish mobile company Nokia. It is both a widget engine and a widget deployment service where mini-applications called widgets can be uploaded to WidSets servers to be compiled and then automatically deployed to MIDP 2.0 compliant mobile phones running the WidSets client software.

The widgets are created using Extensible Markup Language (XML), Cascading Style Sheets (CSS), and Helium scripting language. WidSets is a combined application and service that is similar to what a widget does on a desktop PC, on a wide variety of mobile phones. WidSets are micro-applications intended to perform a single function. WidSets, like widgets, generally rely on some kind of web service to provide information to the user.

WidSets was officially launched in October 2006. It worked on all Java MIDP 2.0 phones, including non-Nokia ones, and was regarded as a mobile counterpart to Netvibes. The current version as of May 2008 is version 2.0.0 for both the client and the SDK. In June 2009, Nokia announced that WidSets is no longer developed, having been replaced by the umbrella Ovi Store.

Example widgets included currency converters, news headlines retrievers and weather forecast information.
