= Nokia N90 =

2005 mobile phone

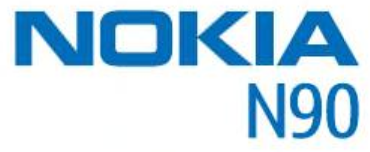

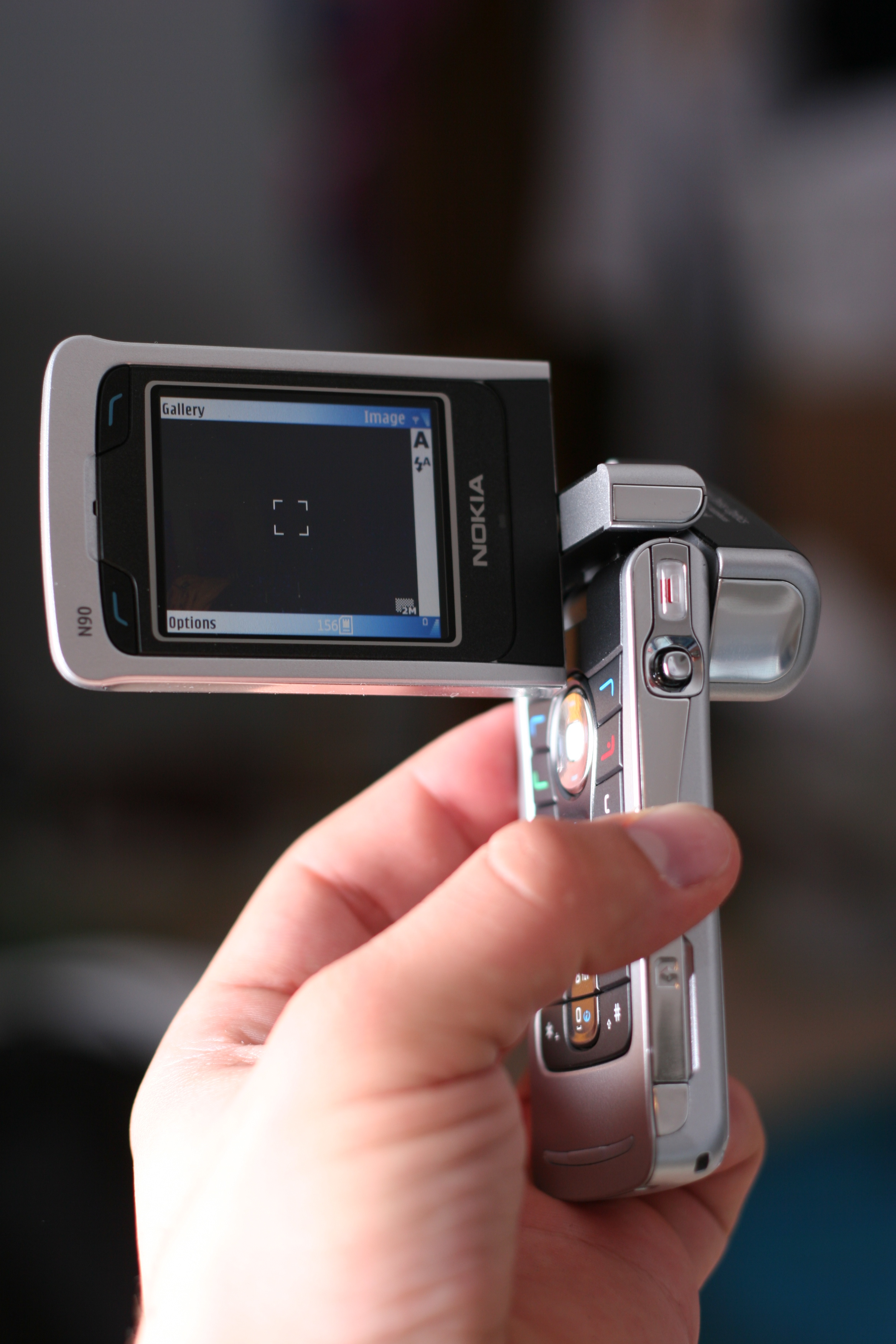
- Manufacturer: Nokia
- Availability by region: 2005
- Predecessor: Nokia 6260
- Successor: Nokia N93
- Related: Nokia N70; Nokia N71; Nokia N72; Nokia N80; Nokia N91; Nokia N92
- Compatible networks: GPRS, EDGE, WCDMA
- Form factor: Clamshell
- Dimensions: 112×51×24 mm (4.41×2.01×0.94 in)
- Weight: 173 g (6 oz)
- Operating system: Symbian OS v8.1a, Series 60 Feature Pack 3
- CPU: TI OMAP 1710, 32-bit RISC ARM9 @ 220 MHz
- Memory: 48 MB
- Removable storage: DV RS-MMC / MMC-Mobile
- Battery: BL-5B, 3.7 V, 760 mAh
- Rear camera: 2 Megapixels
- Front camera: None
- Display: TFT, 262,144 colours, 352×416 pixels
- External display: TFT, 65,536 colours, 128×128 pixels
- Connectivity: USB (v2.0), Bluetooth (v1.2)
- Data inputs: Keypad

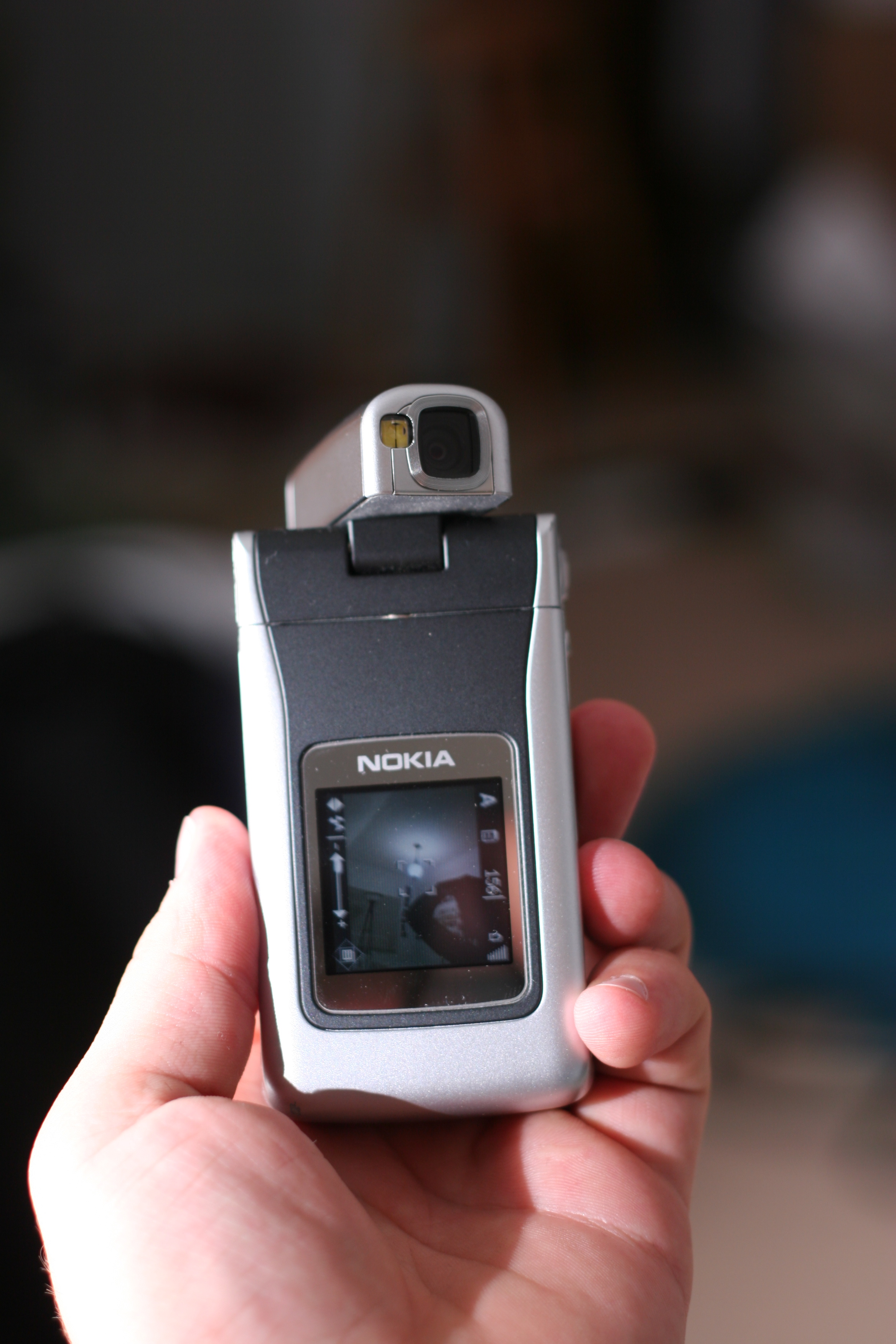
Nokia N90 in portrait/selfie mode

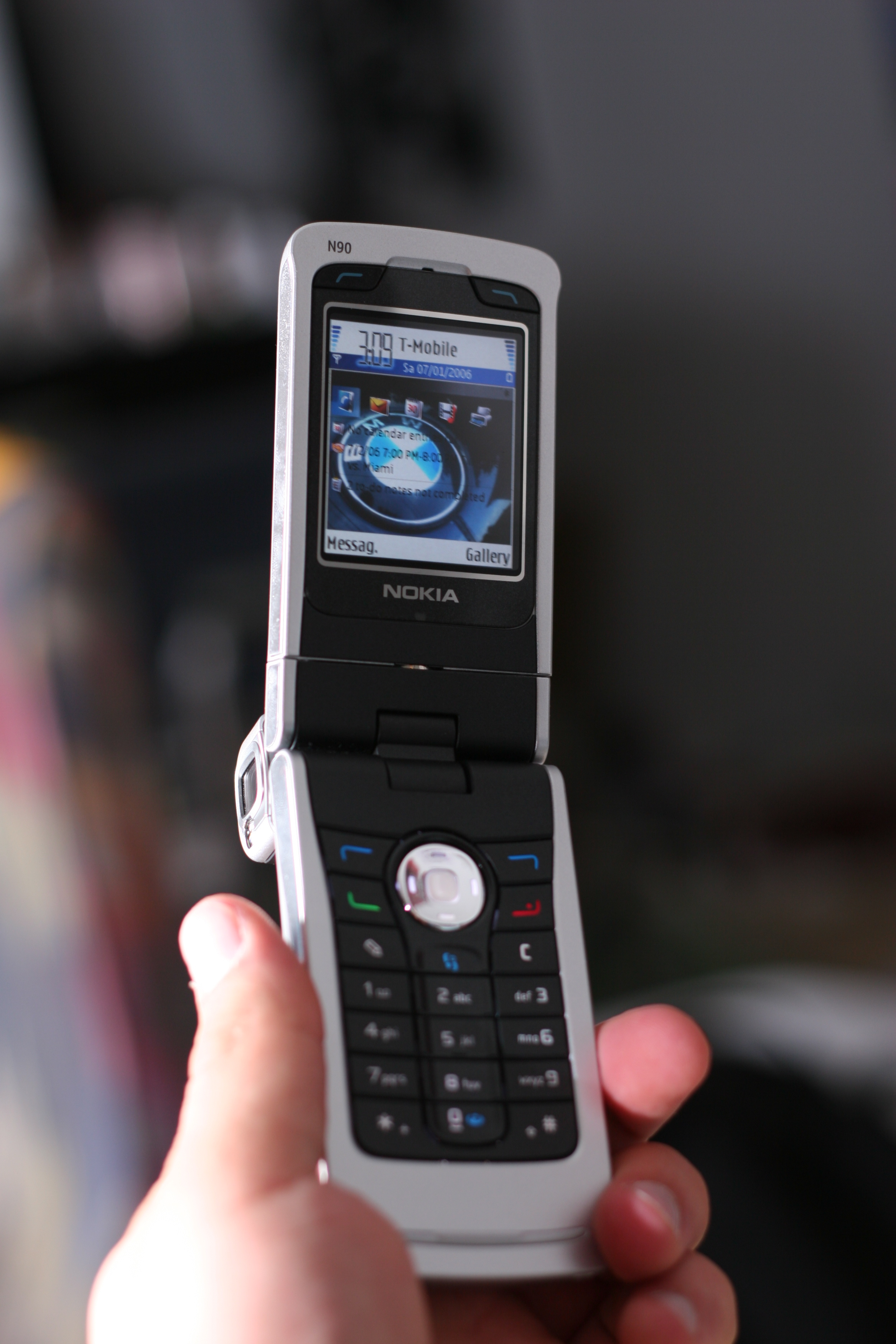
The N90 opened in a normal clamshell way

The Nokia N90 is a mobile phone, announced as part of Nokia's then-new line of multimedia devices, Nseries, on April 27, 2005. It is notable for its unique swivel design encompassing four 'modes'.

It has two displays and has a camera with Carl Zeiss optics and integrated flash, and can record video with audio. The screen can be swiveled 270° to mimic the appearance of a camcorder. The camera lens can also be swiveled. The 2.1-inch display has a pixel density of 259 ppi, considered the most crispest Nokia screen at the time, and continued to be joint-highest with the N80, E60 and E70 for four years, before being beaten by the Nokia N900 in 2009 with 267 ppi. The Nokia N90 can print with some printers over USB or over Bluetooth.

It uses the Series 60 2nd Edition, Feature Pack 3 user interface on top of the Symbian OS 8.1a operating system. Later revisions also shipped with Version 2 of the Nokia Lifeblog software. The Nokia N90 began shipping in Q2 2005 in most markets, but didn't appear in the US until Q1 2006. It was succeeded by the Nokia N93.

The N90 was usually bundled with a 64 MB or 128 MB DV-RS-MMC memory card and a USB data transfer cable.

Complaints about the N90 include high price, large size, weight, and "chunkiness."

== Specification sheet ==
Form factor	Clamshell / Transformer
Operating System	Symbian OS v8.1a, Series 60 Feature Pack 3
Processor	TI OMAP 1710, 32-bit RISC ARM9 @ 220 MHz
GSM frequencies	900/1800/1900 MHz
GPRS	Yes, class 10
EDGE (EGPRS)	Yes, class 10
WCDMA	Yes (2100 MHz)
Main screen	TFT, 262,144 colours, 352×416 pixels (2.1 inches diagonally)
Second screen	TFT, 65,536 colours, 128×128 pixels
Camera	2.0 megapixels (photo light, 20× digital zoom)
Video recording	Yes, CIF (max. clip length 2 h)
Multimedia Messaging	Yes
Video calls	Yes
Push to talk	Yes
Java support	Yes, MIDP 2.0
Built-in memory	31 MB
Memory card slot	Yes, DV RS-MMC / MMC-Mobile
Bluetooth	Yes
Infrared	No
Data cable support	Yes
Browser	WAP 2.0 XHTML / HTML
Email	Yes
Music player	Yes, stereo
Radio	No
Video Player	Yes
Polyphonic tones	Yes, 64 chords
Mp3 ringtones	Yes
HF speakerphone	Yes
Offline mode	Yes
Battery	BL-5B (760 mAh)
Talk time	3 hours
Standby time	12 days (288 hours)
Weight	173 grams
Dimensions	112×51×24 millimeters
Availability	Q2/2005
Else	Quickoffice office suite

== In popular culture ==
The N90 was featured in Tom Clancy's Splinter Cell: Double Agent as a billboard.

The N90 was shown in an episode of NCIS.

The N90 was featured in the music video for Nickelback's Far Away.

== Notable Movies Shot With The Edition ==
- New Love Meetings

== See also ==
- List of Nokia products
