= Nokia N95 =

Mobile phone released by Nokia in 2007

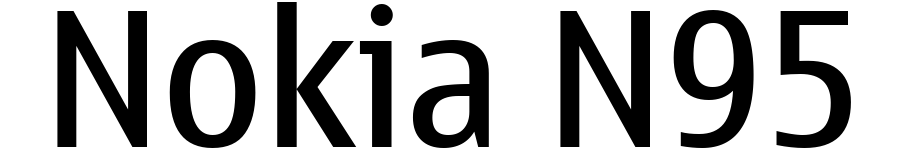

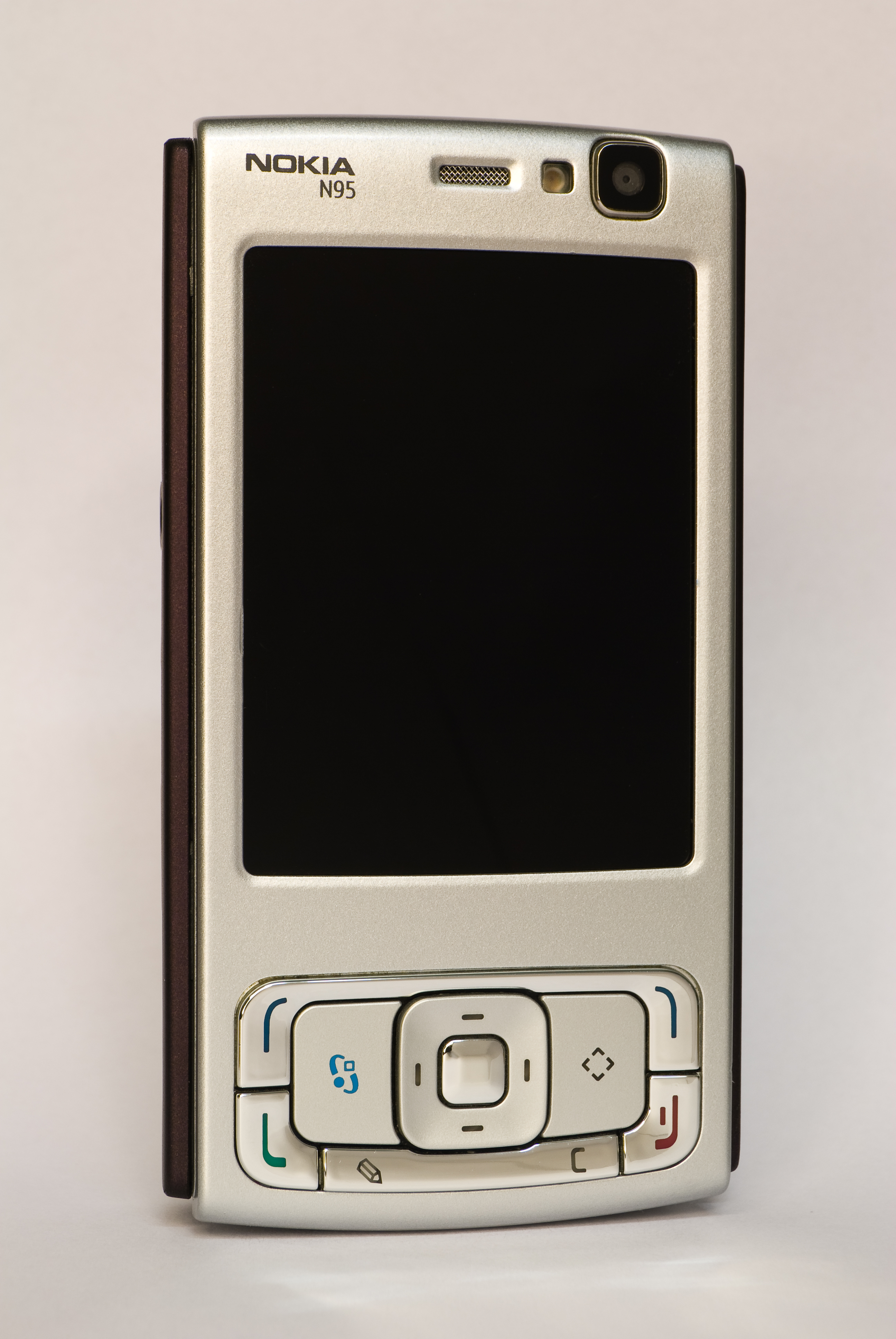
- Manufacturer: Nokia
- Availability by region: March 2007 (N95); September 2007 (N95 8GB)
- Discontinued: 2009
- Predecessor: Nokia N80; Nokia N91; Nokia N93
- Successor: Nokia N96; Nokia N86 8MP
- Related: Nokia N73; Nokia N75; Nokia N76; Nokia N77; Nokia N81; Nokia N82; Nokia N93; Nokia N93i
- Compatible networks: HSDPA (3.5G), Quad band GSM / GPRS / EDGE GSM 850, GSM 900, GSM 1800, GSM 1900
- Form factor: Slider
- Dimensions: 99×53×21 mm (3.90×2.09×0.83 in)
- Weight: 120 g (4 oz)
- Operating system: Symbian OS v9.2, S60 3rd Edition
- CPU: Dual CPU, 332 MHz Texas Instruments OMAP 2420 (ARM11-based)
- Memory: 160 MB (N95); 8GB (N95 8GB)
- Removable storage: MicroSD (N95) none (N95 8GB)
- Battery: BL-5F (950 mAh)
- Rear camera: 5 Megapixels (back)
- Front camera: CIF video call (front)
- Display: 240x320 px, 2.6 in, TFT LCD
- Connectivity: USB 2.0, Bluetooth 2.0, Wi-Fi b/g, InfraRed
- Data inputs: Keypad
- Development status: Discontinued (2009)

The Nokia N95 and Nokia N95 8GB are high-end mobile phones produced by Nokia as part of their former Nseries line of multimedia mobile devices. Announced in September 2006, it was released to the market in March 2007. The N95 runs S60 3rd Edition (Feature Pack 1), on Symbian OS v9.2. It has a two-way sliding mechanism, which can be used to access either media playback buttons or a numeric keypad. It was first released in silver and later on in black, with limited edition quantities in gold and purple. The launch price of the N95 was around €550 or US$730 (€820/US$1,105 in 2025 adjusted for inflation).

The Nokia N95 was a high-end model that was marketed as a "multimedia computer", much like other Nseries devices. It featured a then-high 5 megapixel resolution digital camera with Carl Zeiss optics and with a flash, as well as a then-large display measuring 2.6 inches. It was also Nokia's first phone with a built-in Global Positioning System (GPS) receiver, used for maps or turn-by-turn navigation, and their first with an accelerometer. It was also one of the earliest devices in the market supporting HSDPA (3.5G) signals.

The Nokia N95 8GB features a larger display and improved battery in addition to its titular 8 gigabytes of internal storage, which compensates for the removal of microSD memory card slot. The N95 are widely considered as breakthrough devices at the time of their launch. The N95 was well-regarded for its camera, GPS and mapping capabilities, and its innovative dual-slider form factor, and some have hailed it as one of the best mobile devices to have been released.

== History ==
The phone was unveiled on 26 September 2006 at the Nokia Open Studio 2006 event in New York City. It was considered to have been a turning point in the mobile industry due to its various capabilities; however, the device took a further six months until it was released. On 8 March 2007, Nokia was shipping N95 in key European, Asian, and Middle Eastern markets. It was on sale in many more countries during the week of 11 March. The N95 was still only available in limited quantities at this early stage and therefore its price was briefly raised to 800 euros.

On 7 April 2007, the N95 went on sale in the United States through Nokia's Flagship stores in New York and Chicago and through Nokia's nseries.com website. No US carriers were expected to offer this phone. The U.S. version started retailing without carrier branding or discounts in Nokia's flagship stores in New York and Chicago on 26 September 2007.

On 29 August 2007, two updated versions of the N95 were announced at a press event in London; first, the N95-2 (N95 8 GB), an updated version for the European/Asian markets with 8 gigabytes of internal storage and larger screen; secondly, the N95-3 (N95 NAM), replacing the original 2100 MHz W-CDMA air interface with support for the 850 MHz and 1900 MHz frequencies used for the 3G networks of most GSM-compatible mobile carriers in the Americas, including AT&T Mobility.

Finally, later on 7 January 2008, Nokia introduced the N95-4, which is the US 8 GB version of the N95-3. The phone got its FCC approval on 30 January and launched 18 March. The first carrier to utilise this approval was Rogers Wireless in May 2009. Also at CES 2008, a red-coloured limited edition Nokia N95 was announced and released that year.

The N95's main competitors during its lifetime were the LG Prada, Apple's iPhone (1st generation), Sony Ericsson's W950i and K850. The N95 managed to outsell its rivals. Despite Apple's much-hyped iPhone with its multi-touch technology, thin design and advanced web capabilities, the N95 had several key features against the iPhone, such as its camera with flash, video camera, Bluetooth file sharing, 3G and 3.5G connectivity, GPS, third-party applications and several other features.

Even after the release of later Nseries phones, the N95's retail price was still around US$400 (about €300) as of early 2010 despite its three-year-old age.

== Features ==
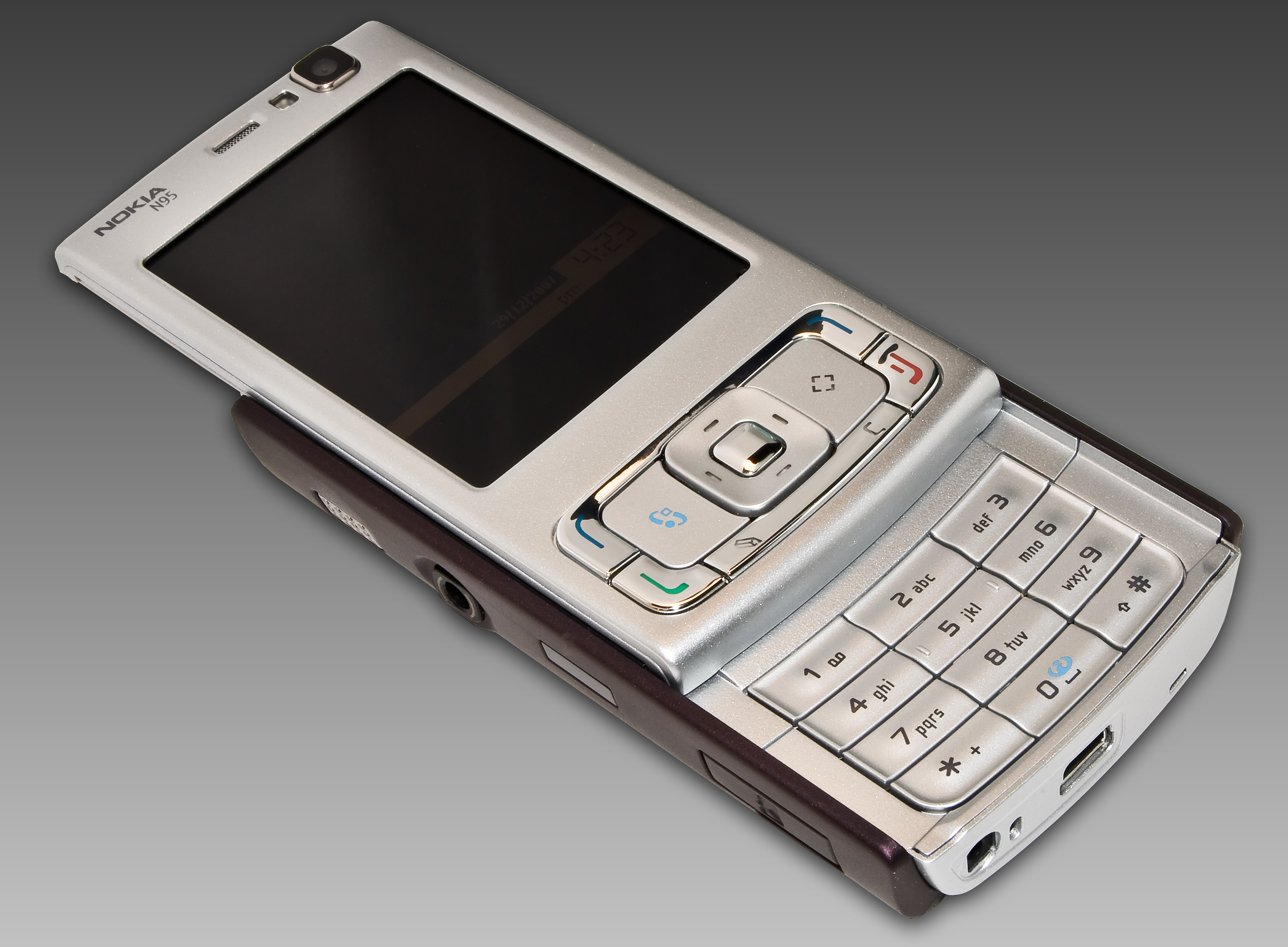
The Nokia N95 open

=== Integrated GPS ability ===
The N95 contained an integrated GPS receiver which was located below the 0 key on the keypad. The phone shipped with Nokia Maps navigation software.

=== Multimedia features ===
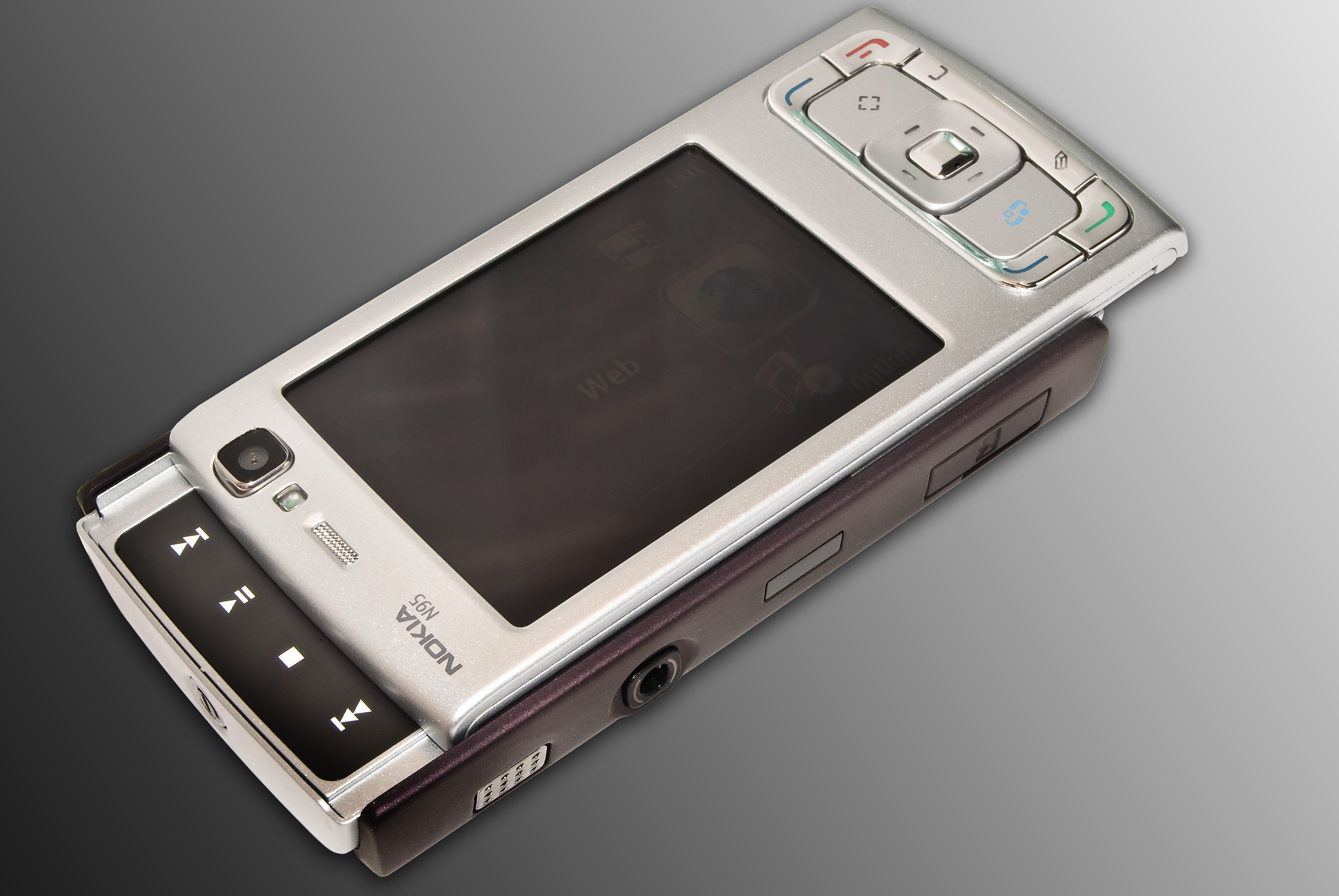
The N95's dedicated multimedia keys were accessed via the 2-way slider.

Out of the box, the N95 supported audio in MP3, WMA, RealAudio, SP-MIDI, AAC+, eAAC+, MIDI, AMR, and M4A formats. Its two-way slide, when opened towards the keypad, allowed access to its media playback buttons. A standard 3.5 mm jack is located on the left side of the phone and allowed the user to connect any standard headphones to the unit. With the AD-43 headset adapter the N95 introduced support for multiple remote control buttons on the headset. Users can also use Bluetooth for audio output using A2DP, or use the built-in stereo speakers. The N95 is also capable of playing video in 3GP, MPEG4, RealVideo, and, in newer firmware, Flash Video formats. All of the phone's video output could also be played through the TV-out feature. TV-out is a feature offered by the phones OMAP processor, that allowed users to connect the smartphone, using the supplied cable, to a TV or any other composite video input. Its main purpose was to allow users to show photos and videos on a large screen. The N95's built in UPnP and DLNA capabilities also allowed the user to share the phones' media over a WLAN network. This provides easy access to the photos, music, and videos stored on the phone, from other UPnP/DLNA capable devices on the network, enabling them to be watched or downloaded over the air.

=== Internet ===
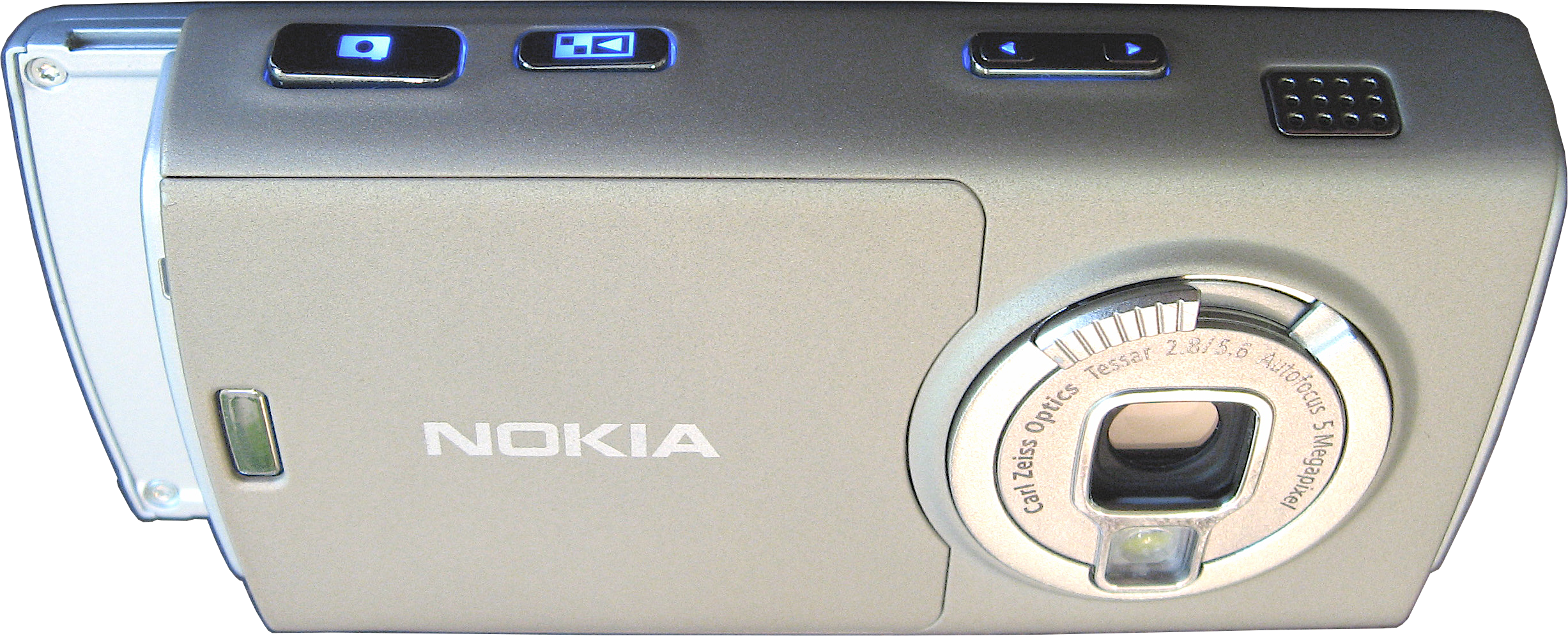
back of an N95, with the lens-cover open

The N95 had built-in Wi-Fi, with which it could access the Internet (through an 802.11b/g wireless network). The N95 could also connect to the Internet through a carrier packet data network such as UMTS, HSDPA, or EDGE. The webkit-based browser displayed full web pages as opposed to simplified pages as on most other phones. Web pages may be viewed in portrait or landscape mode and automatic zooming was supported. The N95 also has built-in Bluetooth and works with wireless earpieces that use Bluetooth 2.0 technology and for file transfer.

The original N95 did not support US-based versions of UMTS/HSDPA; UMTS features in these versions of the phone are disabled by default. Furthermore, the later N95 US versions support only AT&T's 850/1900 MHz UMTS/HSDPA bands, neither 1700 MHz of T-Mobile USA nor 2100 MHz bands are supported internationally.

The phone could also act as a WAN access point allowing a tethered PC access to a carrier's packet data network. VoIP software and functionality is also included with the phone (though some carriers have opted to remove this feature).

=== Accelerometer ===
The N95 included a built-in accelerometer. This was originally only used for video stabilization and photo orientation (to keep landscape or portrait shots oriented as taken).

Nokia Research Center allowed an application interface directly to the accelerometer, allowing software to use the data from it. Nokia has released a step counter application to demonstrate this. Another Nokia-created application taking advantage of the accelerometer is Nokia Sports Tracker.

Third-party programs were created, including software that will automatically change the screen orientation when the phone is tilted, a program that simulates the sounds of a Star Wars lightsaber when the phone is waved through the air, a program allowing the user to mute the phone by turning it face-down, etc.

=== N-Gage ===
The N95 was compatible with the N-Gage mobile gaming service.

== Reception ==
The N95 was much talked about after announcement but was initially viewed as a niche feature-packed device. However it became a huge sales success for Nokia when released in most regions. 7 million Nokia N95 units were sold by the end of 2007. In its Q1 2008 report, Nokia claimed that 3 million N95 (including 8GB variant) units were shipped that quarter, bringing the total to at least 10 million. It managed to outsell rivals such as LG Viewty and iPhone.

Its camera capabilities put it in competition with phones such as Sony Ericsson K850i.

On 6 November 2007, AllAboutSymbian declared the N95 8GB as the "best smartphone ever". Years later on 24 January 2013, PC Magazine described the Nokia N95 as "One of the best smartphones in history on any platform". Gsmarena described N95 as "the best mobile phone on the market with no adequate competitors".

A slightly improved model in a candybar form called Nokia N82 was released in late 2007. The next year saw the introduction of the Nokia N96.

The 2010 Indian Malayalam-language experimental film Jalachhayam was shot entirely using a Nokia N95 8GB.

== Specification sheet ==
Feature	Specification
Form factor	two-way slider
Operating System	Symbian OS v9.2, S60 3rd Edition, Feature Pack 1
Screen	QVGA Matrix, diagonal 2.6" (N95-1, N95-3, N95-5) or 2.8" (N95-2, N95-4, N95-6), 16 million colours, 240x320 pixels
Size	99 mm × 53 mm × 21 mm
CPU	Dual CPU, 332 MHz Texas Instruments OMAP 2420 (ARM11-based)
Internal Dynamic Memory (RAM)	128 MB (55.9 MB for N95-1)
Internal Flash Memory	147.3 MB (8 GB for 8 GB versions)
Camera	Frontal CIF video call & main rear 2592 × 1944 camera with auto-focus, Carl Zeiss optics, capture Aspect ratio (image) 4/3 (1.33:1)
Video recording	Yes, VGA (640×480) video capture of up to 30 frame/s, same aspect ratio as camera see above
Graphics	Fully HW accelerated 3D (OpenGL ES 1.1, HW accelerated Java 3D)
Memory card slot	Yes, microSD/microSDHC (except N95-4; 8 GB model) - supports up to 32 GB cards
Bluetooth	Yes, 2.0 + EDR; supports most profiles, including: HSP and HFP for hands-free calling; A2DP and AVRCP for stereo audio and control; HID to attach a compatible keyboard; DUN to use phone as a modem for internet tethering from other devices; OBEX to send and receive business cards, pictures, and other files
GPS	Texas Instruments GPS5300 NaviLink 4.0 (receiver located under the 0 key)
Wi-Fi	Yes, with wireless LAN (802.11 b/g) and UPnP (Universal Plug and Play)
Infrared	Yes
Data cable support	Yes, USB 2.0 via mini USB port
Email	Yes (ActiveSync, POP3, IMAP4 and SMTP, with SSL/TLS)
Music player	Yes, Stereo speakers with 3D audio
Radio	Yes, Stereo FM radio, and Visual Radio (wired headphones or hands-free required)
Video Player/editor	Yes
Polyphonic tones	Yes, 172 chords
Ringtones	Yes, MP3/AAC/AAC+/eAAC+/WMA/M4A, RealAudio
HF speakerphone	Yes, with 3.5 mm audio jack and 2.1A2DP wireless stereo headphone support
Offline mode	Yes
Battery	BL-6F 1200 mAh (BL-5F 950 mAh for N95-1)
Talk time	up to 160 min (WCDMA), up to 240 min (GSM)
Standby time	up to 200 hours (WCDMA) or 225 hours (GSM)
Latest firmware	v35.0.002

== Variants ==
=== N95 8GB (N95-2) ===
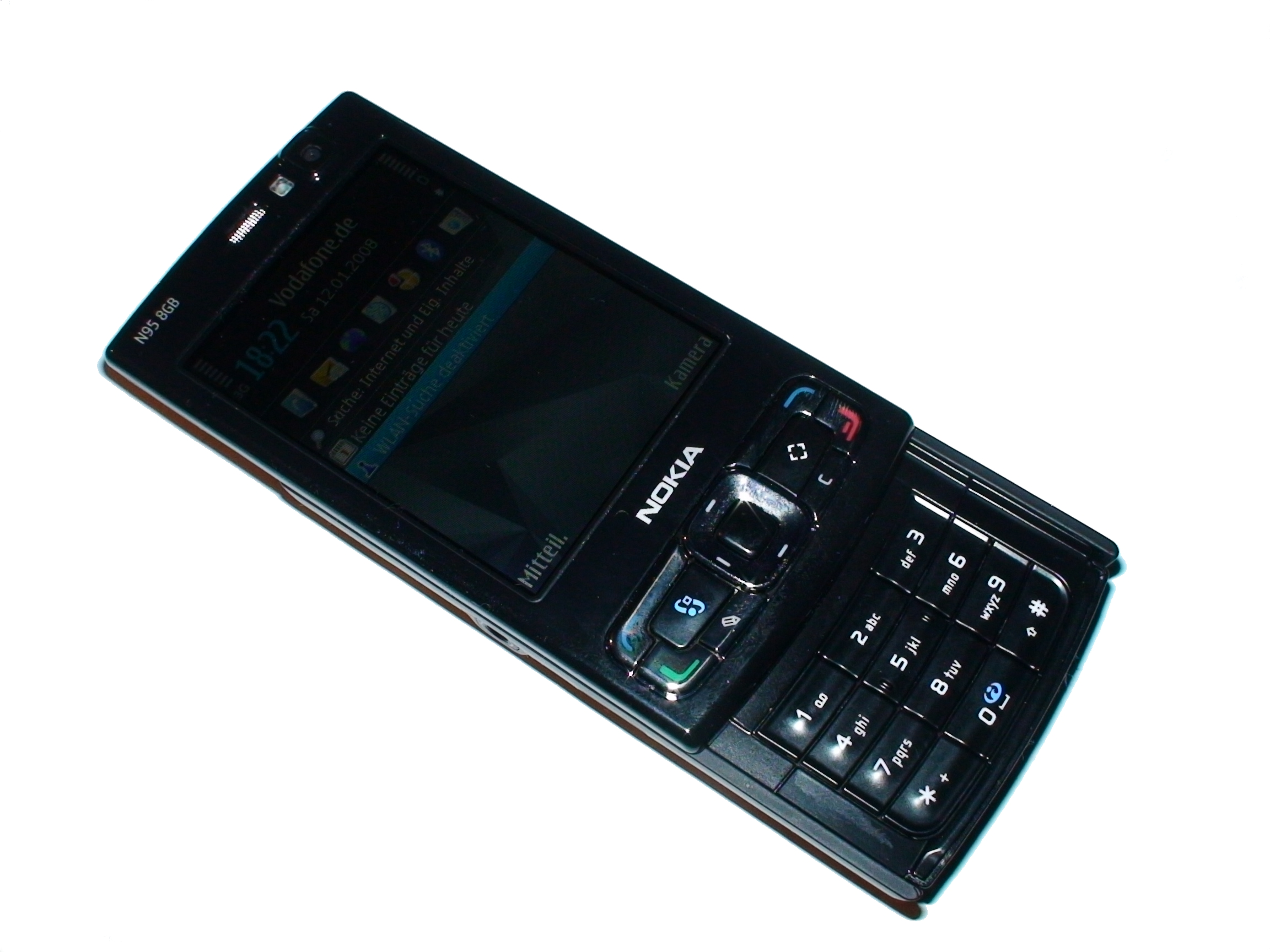
The N95 8GB

A revision of the N95, called N95 8 GB (N95-2, internally known as RM-320), was announced on 29 August 2007, and released in October 2007. It was released in a black color, instead of silver like the N95-1.

Because of this new model, the original N95 is often referred to as N95 Classic.

The changes compared to the original N95 are:

==== Improvements ====
- 8 GB separate internal memory
- Larger display (up from 2.6 inches (66 mm) to 2.8").
- 128 MB RAM (up from 64 MB), 95 MB available.
- Demand paging (although the N95 supports this too, since firmware version 20.0.015)
- 1200 mAh battery (BL-6F), up from 950 mAh
- Cosmetic changes to media and front-panel buttons
- New model of handsfree/remote control, AD-54 (as opposed to AD-43 for previous N95 versions)
- New multimedia menu, with Nokia's Ovi content integration
- Built-in Automatic Screen Rotation (ASR) in software versions v20.0.016 onwards for the N95 8 GB version and from v30.0.015 for N95-1, respectively.
- Black faceplate instead of the original silver.
- Sturdier battery cover.

==== Negative changes ====
- Pixel density was 142 DPI, compared to 153 DPI for the N95; this is due to the larger display but with the same resolution (QVGA)
- MicroSD slot removed
- Slider protecting camera lens was removed to make room for the larger battery; the camera application is now started by holding down the shutter release button
- Removal of built-in video editor (later added with the firmware upgrades)
- Mass: 128 g, up 8 g from 120 g

=== N95 NAM (N95-3) ===
The Nokia N95-3 was a revision of the N95, internally designated as RM-160, designed specifically for the North American market. It was also available in Australian and South American market.

The following was changed from the original version:

- 128 MB RAM, up from 64 MB.
- WCDMA (HSDPA) 850 and 1900 MHz, instead of 2100 MHz.
- 1200 mAh battery, up from 950 mAh.
- Talk time up to 190 min (WCDMA), up to 250 min (GSM).
- Slider protecting camera lens removed to make room for the larger battery.
- Camera flash moved to the vertical axis of the phone, so when the phone is used as a camera it sits to the side of the camera, instead of below as in the N95-1.
- Cosmetic changes to media buttons.
- Height: 2.05 cm, down from 2.10 cm.
- Mass: 125 g, up from 120 g.
- White keyboard light instead of blue for visibility improvement.
- Current firmware version V 35.2.001, 13-10-09, RM-160

=== N95 8GB NAM (N95-4) ===
The main differences to the N95-2 were:

- Camera lens was now more flush with the phone's face.
- Multimedia keys were less glossy.

Both N95-3 and N95-4 also had some additional changes, such as the removal of the sliding lens cover for the camera, improved battery life, and doubling of RAM from 64 to 128 MB.

=== N95 CHINA (N95-5) ===
Featuring the internal name RM-245, the N95-5 was targeted at the Chinese market. The main difference from the regular N95 was the lack of any 3G connectivity support, which has not been yet adopted in China at the time of release, and the absence of WLAN connectivity, due to Chinese regulations.

=== N95 8GB CHINA (N95-6) ===
The N95-6, internally coded RM-321 was a Chinese market-targeted version of the N95-2, lacking 3G and WLAN support just like the N95-5.

=== Versions comparison ===
This table lists only the specifications that differ between versions of the N95 models.

Feature	N95 (N95-1)	N95 8 GB (N95-2)	N95 NAM (N95-3)	N95 8 GB NAM (N95-4)	N95 CHINA (N95-5)	N95 8 GB CHINA (N95-6)
Internal name	RM-159	RM-320	RM-160	RM-421	RM-245	RM-321
Release date	March 2007	August 2007	November 2007	January 2008	February 2008	February 2008
WCDMA frequencies	2100 MHz	2100 MHz	850/1900 MHz	850/1900 MHz	none	none
WLAN connectivity	yes	yes	yes	yes	no	no
Internal Dynamic Memory (RAM)	64 MB	128 MB	128 MB	128 MB	128 MB	128 MB
Internal Flash Memory	160 MB	8 GB	160 MB	8 GB	160 MB	8 GB
Memory card slot	micro SD/SDHC	none	micro SD/SDHC	none	micro SD/SDHC	none
Battery	950 mAh	1200 mAh	1200 mAh	1200 mAh	1200 mAh	1200 mAh
Talk time (GSM)	4 hr	5 hr	5 hr	5 hr	5 hr	5 hr
Standby time (GSM)	9.3 days	11.6 days	12 days	12 days	10.5 days	12 days
Screen	diagonal 2.6"	diagonal 2.8"	diagonal 2.6"	diagonal 2.8"	diagonal 2.6"	diagonal 2.8"
Mass	120 g	128 g	124 g	128 g	124 g	128 g
Camera lens cover	yes	no	no	no	no	no

=== Cancelled revision ===
In late 2020, prototype videos surfaced of a planned revision of the N95 that was never put into production, which included slide-out media controls and speakers, and a kickstand.

== See also ==
- Nokia Nseries
- List of Nokia products#GPS products
