= Nokia N71 =

Mobile phone model

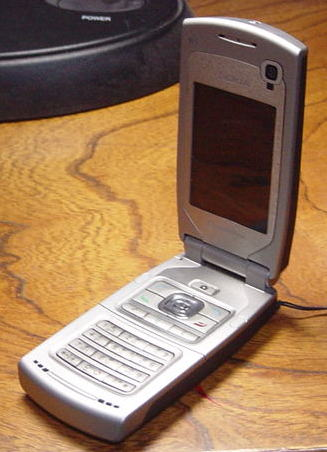
- Manufacturer: Nokia
- Predecessor: Nokia 6170
- Successor: Nokia N75; Nokia N76
- Related: Nokia N70; Nokia N72; Nokia N80; Nokia N90; Nokia N91; Nokia N92
- Compatible networks: Single band UMTS / UMTS 2100, Quad band GSM / GPRS / GSM 850, GSM 900, GSM 1800, GSM 1900
- Form factor: Clamshell
- Dimensions: 98.6×51.2×25.8 mm (3.88×2.02×1.02 in)
- Weight: 139 g (5 oz)
- Operating system: Symbian 9.1 (S60 3rd)
- CPU: 220 MHz
- Memory: 10 megabytes
- Removable storage: 128 MiB MiniSD card
- Battery: Li-Ion 970 mAh (BL-5C)
- Rear camera: 2 Megapixel
- Front camera: VGA
- Display: 320x240 pixels, 262,144 colors
- External display: 96x68 pixels, 65,000 colors

The Nokia N71 is a mobile phone announced by Nokia on 2 November 2005 and released in June 2006. It was Nokia's joint-first clamshell smartphone, like the N92 announced on the same day. The N71 runs on Symbian OS v9.1 (S60 3rd Edition).

== Features ==
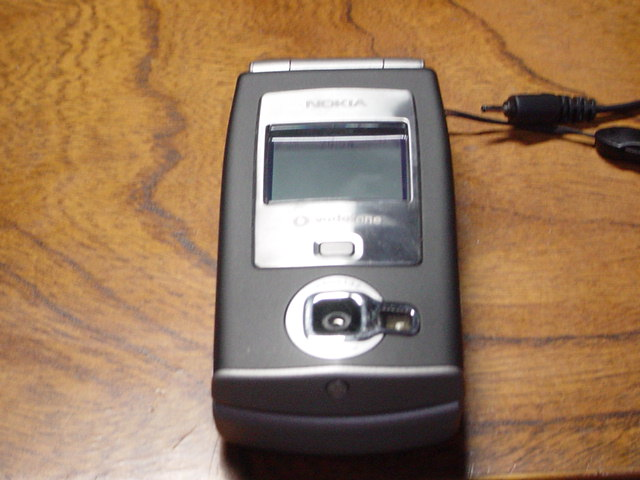
The N71 closed

Features include a 2 megapixel camera, a built-in flash, a front VGA camera to allow real-time video calling, FM radio, Bluetooth, digital music player functionality, comes standard with a full Web browser, and has support for 3D Java games. It also has 3G and a mini-SD card slot for expandable memory.

Other features include its ability to transfer data via W-CDMA 2100, GPRS and EDGE.

Nokia promotes the N71's 2-megapixel digital rear camera as producing high-quality photography and video as well as its music and radio functionality (the phone's multimedia mini-SD card means it can hold up to 2 gigabytes, equating to potentially hundreds of tracks).

According to Nokia its specifications are:

- Battery stand-by max - 216 hours
- Battery talk time max - 240 mins
- SAR rating - 0.38 W/kg.
