= Nokia N91 =

Slider mobile phone with a dedicated MP3 buttons

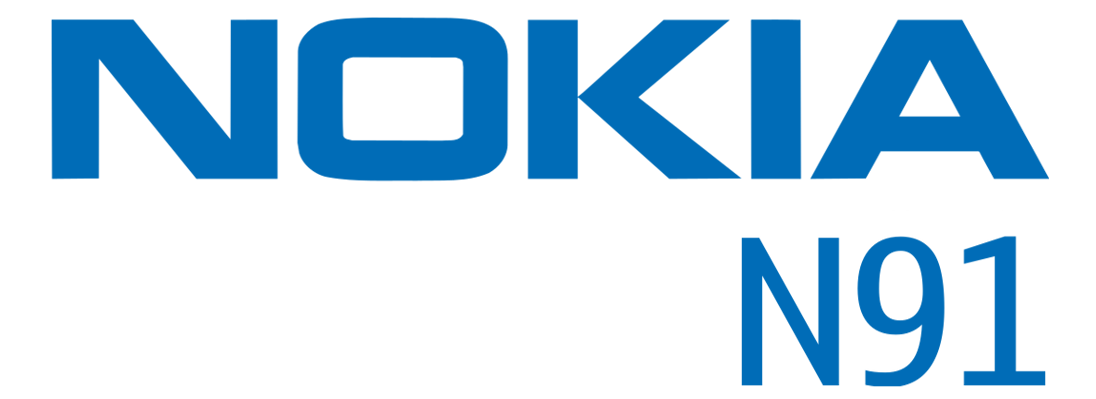

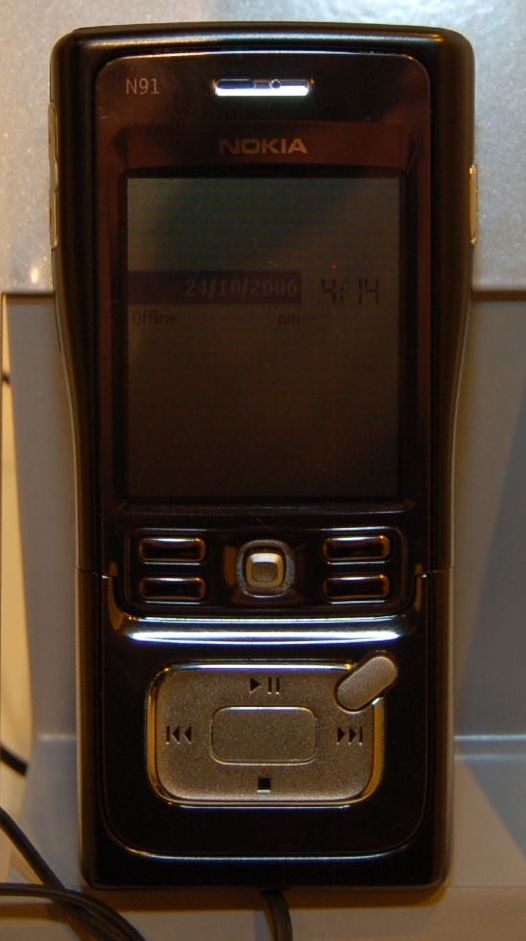
- Manufacturer: Nokia
- Availability by region: April 2006 (N91); September 2006 (N91 8GB)
- Predecessor: Nokia 6650
- Successor: Nokia N81; Nokia N95
- Related: Nokia N70; Nokia N71; Nokia N72; Nokia N80; Nokia N90; Nokia N92
- Compatible networks: 802.11, GSM, GPRS, EDGE, WCDMA, Wi-Fi -- 802.11g
- Form factor: Slider
- Weight: 164 g (6 oz)
- Operating system: Symbian OS v9.1 (S60 3rd Edition)
- CPU: Dual CPU, 220 MHz Texas Instruments OMAP 171x (ARM9-based)
- Memory: 64MB RAM
- Storage: 4GB / 8GB HDD
- Battery: BL-5C, 3.7 V, 970 mAh
- Rear camera: 2 Megapixels
- Display: 176 x 208, 262k colours TFT LCD (130 ppi)
- Connectivity: 2G Networks/ 3G Networks depending on the model.
- Data inputs: Standard Symbian Keypad (featuring green, red, menu, write, left & right selection/softkeys, joystick/pad, 1-# numerical) and XpressMusic keys
- Development status: Discontinued (2008)

The Nokia N91 is a mobile phone produced by Nokia as part of their Nseries line of portable devices. It was announced on April 27, 2005 along with N70 and N90 as the first three Nseries devices. The N91 ran on Symbian-based S60 3rd Edition (the first to run on Symbian 9.1). It was the first ever phone encompassing a 4 GB internal hard drive, allowing storage for 3,000 songs (an 8 GB revision came later). The N91 is highly focused on music. with dedicated music keys on the front which slide down to reveal the keypad. It also featured the industry-standard 3.5 mm headphone jack, and was anticipated as a major challenger to Apple, whose iPod dominated the industry. The design of the N91 is based on stainless steel with a matte finish.

The N91 became one of 2005's most anticipated phones, however it suffered from a long delay of release. It was expected to begin shipping by the end of 2005; but in September that year the device was delayed till 2006. In February 2006, it was delayed yet again due to software issues, pushing the release to Q2. Finally in April 2006 it was first released to consumers, a full year after announcement.

Nevertheless, N91 won the 'Most Innovative Product' and 'Most Technologically Advanced Product' award in recognition of its true multimedia music experience, added together with its high-end smartphone capabilities. In advertisements for the phone, Nokia recommended Bose and Sennheiser headphones. Its sound output is considered by many to be of very high quality and very loud.

== Features ==
It features a 2-megapixel camera and a music player playing songs encoded in either AAC, AAC+, eAAC+, MP3, mp3PRO, WAV, MIDI, or Microsoft's WMA format. It is generally considered the benchmark in the music department, simply for its unparalleled sound quality through headphones. It also features 3G and Wi-Fi connectivity. The phone features a 176 x 208, 262,144 colours TFT LCD and dedicated music functionality buttons (XpressMusic) that slide down to reveal traditional mobile phone keys. Battery life when solely playing music has been estimated at 12 hours.

The N91 was not the first smartphone with a gigabyte hard drive: the Samsung SGH-i300, announced just a month before the N91, was the first. However the N91 packed in 4 GB, compared to 3 GB for the i300.

== Variants ==
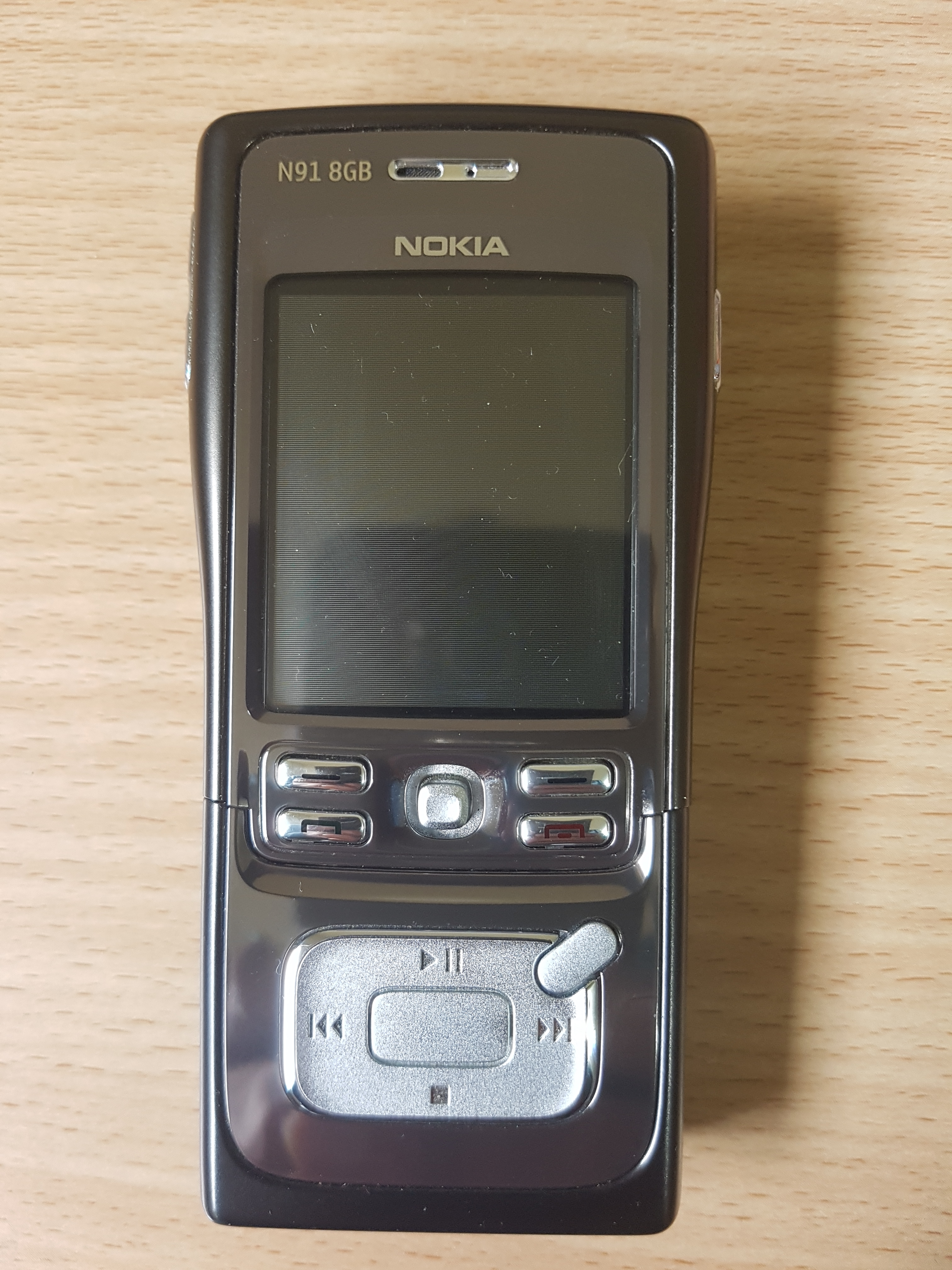
N91 8GB (Music Edition)

An 8GB variant or N91 8GB, internally known as N91-2, was announced on September 26, 2006. This upgraded model features some minor improvements in addition to the extra storage space. The most prominent feature on the N91-2, apart from the increased memory, was the inclusion of A2DP Bluetooth Profile. This profile enabled wireless music playback over Bluetooth, in full stereo (2 different channels, L+R). Compatible Bluetooth headsets were already available in the market by then. N91 8GB had a distinct Black color, that added to its face value. Once again breaking a record: it was the first phone with an 8GB hard disk.

N91-5 was a version of the N91 with the 4 GB memory, but without Wi-Fi (WLAN) and 3G Network support. It was produced by the Chinese plant of Nokia. This model retailed for about 50 Euros less than the regular N91.

=== Improvements ===
- 8GB HDD
- A2DP profile is supported (BT Stereo audio)
- Improved Gallery (replaced old style gallery in 4GB version)
- Sound Recorder support
- UPnP support
- H264 support (QCIF 176x144)
- General stability improvements in HDD
- HDD Tools added: Scandisk and defragmentation
- WMA DRM support (although this was added to 4GB version in updated firmware)
- Visualization effects in the music player
- Distinct Black color
- Better WLAN and Web browser

== Problems and criticisms ==
There have been a few problems with the N91, namely connecting the phone to a Macintosh computer. This will often cause the phone to crash as the two units are disconnected and music files are often not recognised despite being loaded into the phone's hard drive. Also, in old firmware versions, when you install a new theme, it will reset itself back to the default theme. Users can update the firmware using Nokia's PC Suite.

In the Philippines, there was an incident involving an N91 being used with one of Nokia's 46 million recalled BL-5C lithium-ion batteries, and exploded as a result.

== Reviews ==
- Camera-Phones-Spot
- All About Symbian N91 review
- InfoSync World
- N91 Reviews and specifications roundup
- Howard Chui brief Nokia N91 review
- The Smartphones Show – N91 video review
- Mobile Today – Retailer Review
- Mobile-Review
