= Nokia 6170 =

Mobile phone model

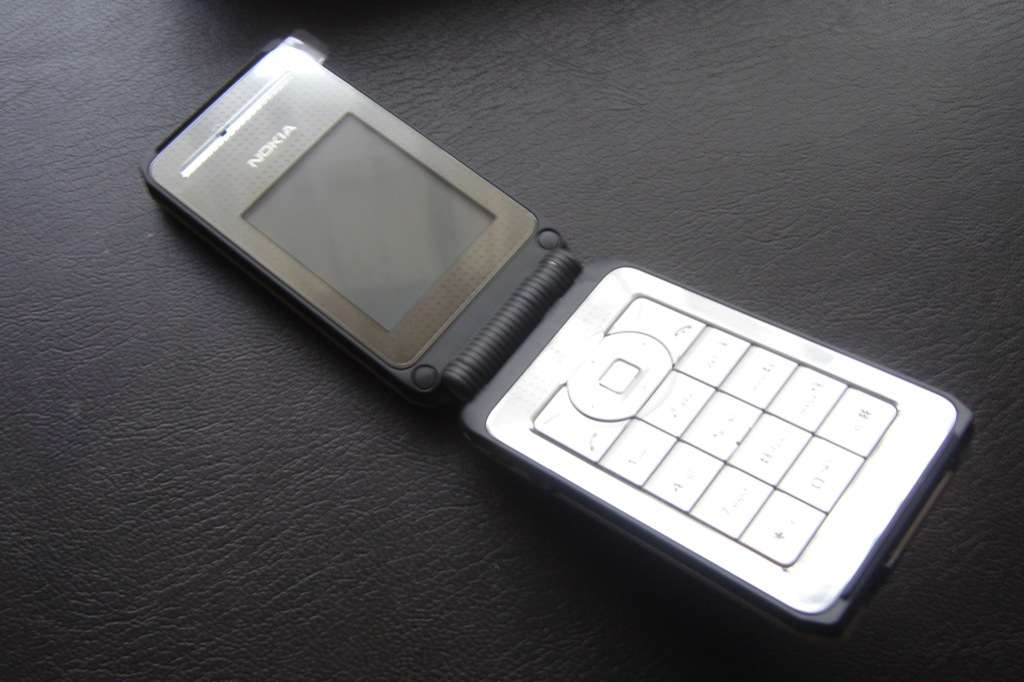
Open clamshell Nokia 6170

The Nokia 6170 was one of the clamshell phone series from Nokia.

== Description ==
It comes with a VGA camera (640x480) with 2x and 4x electronic zoom, push to talk and speakerphone.

It has a built-in WAP web browser, and supports Java ME. It has 2.3 MBs integrated memory that can't be extended (and some elements that ship inside the phone's file system are impossible to delete).

The phone supports IRDA but not Bluetooth, and can send and receive multimedia messages of up to 100 KBs in size.

The phone has a metallic look and spots a small colour screen on the outside of the clamshell.

The European version 6170 RM-47 supports 900 MHz, 1800 MHz and 1900 MHz radios, while the U.S. version 6170b RM-48 supports 850 MHz, 1800 MHz and 1900 MHz radios.

It was the successor of Nokia 6102i and succeeded by the Nokia N71 which was released in June 2006.
