= Nokia N80 =

3G slider mobile phone released by Nokia in 2005

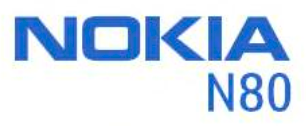

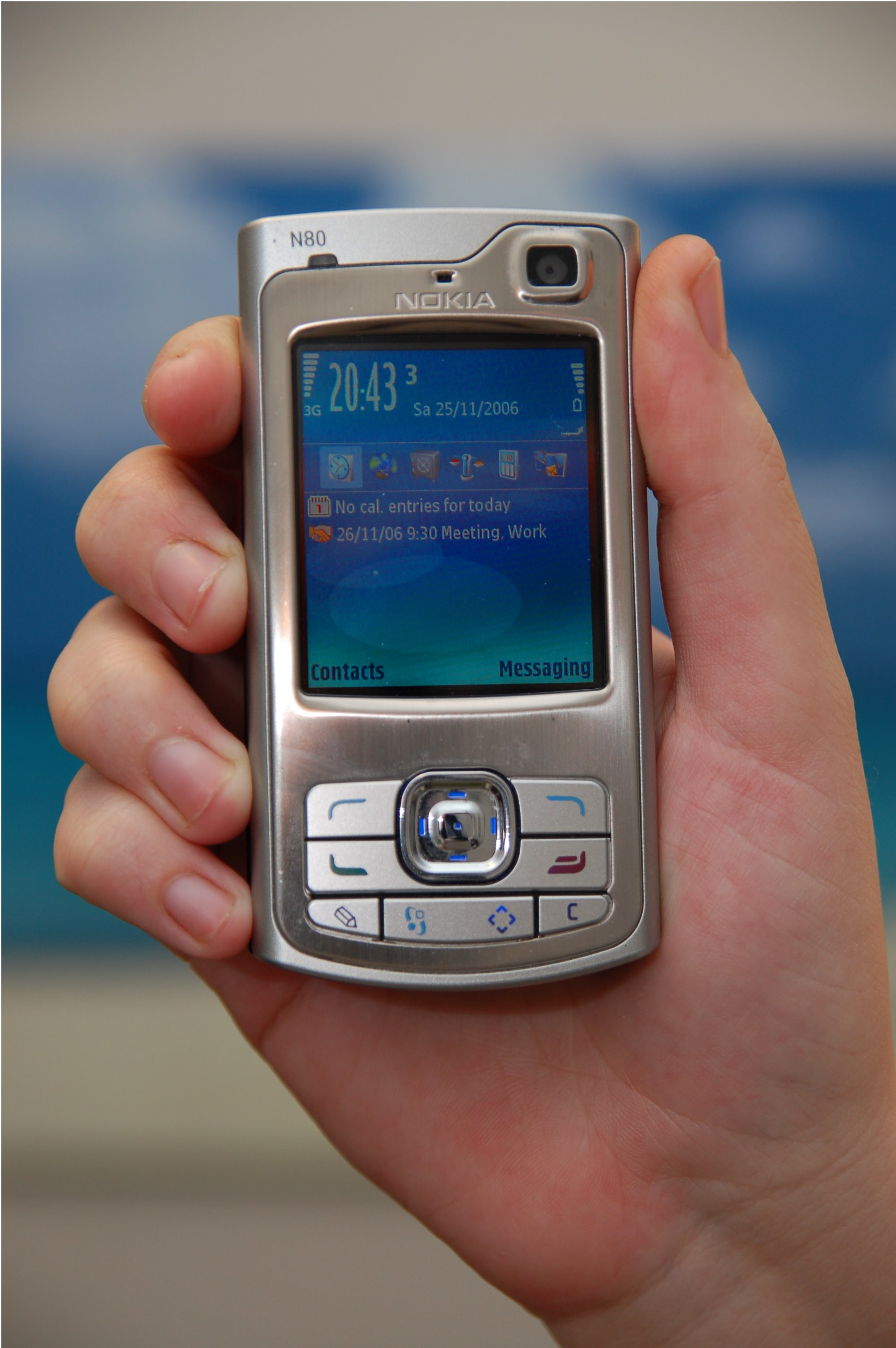
- Manufacturer: Nokia
- Series: Nokia Nseries
- Availability by region: Q2 2006
- Predecessor: Nokia 6280; Nokia 7650
- Successor: Nokia N81; Nokia N95
- Related: Nokia N70; Nokia N71; Nokia N72; Nokia N90; Nokia N91; Nokia N92
- Compatible networks: GPRS, EDGE, WCDMA
- Form factor: Slider, no spring assist
- Operating system: Symbian OS (9.1), S60 3rd Edition (firmware v5.0719.0.2)
- Memory: 40 MB storage memory
- Removable storage: miniSD
- Battery: BL-5B Battery, 3.7 V, 820 mAh
- Rear camera: 3.1 Megapixels
- Front camera: 0.3 Megapixels (video calling)
- Display: TFT, 262k colors, 352 × 416 pixels
- Sound: MP3, AAC
- Connectivity: WLAN b/g (100 mW instead of 250 mW standard)
- Data inputs: Keypad

The Nokia N80 is a 3G mobile phone from Nokia announced on November 2, 2005, part of the multimedia Nseries line. It runs on Symbian OS v9.1 and the S60 3rd Edition interface. It was first released in June 2006.

It has support for high-speed UMTS/WCDMA connections. Features include a 3.1-megapixel camera (interpolated from 2.0-megapixels) with built-in flash, a front camera for videoconferencing, Wi-Fi (802.11g), Universal Plug and Play (UPnP), FM radio, Bluetooth 1.2, MiniSD memory card slot, and support for 3D Java games. Its 2.1-inch display has a pixel density of 259 ppi due to the 352x416 resolution on a 2.1" display making it one of Nokia's sharpest displays of 2005 and 2006.

The N80 was the world's first UPnP-compatible phone, allowing the transfer of media files to compatible devices over Wi-Fi. The N80 was officially described as a multimedia computer by Nokia, like its successor Nokia N95.

== Versions ==
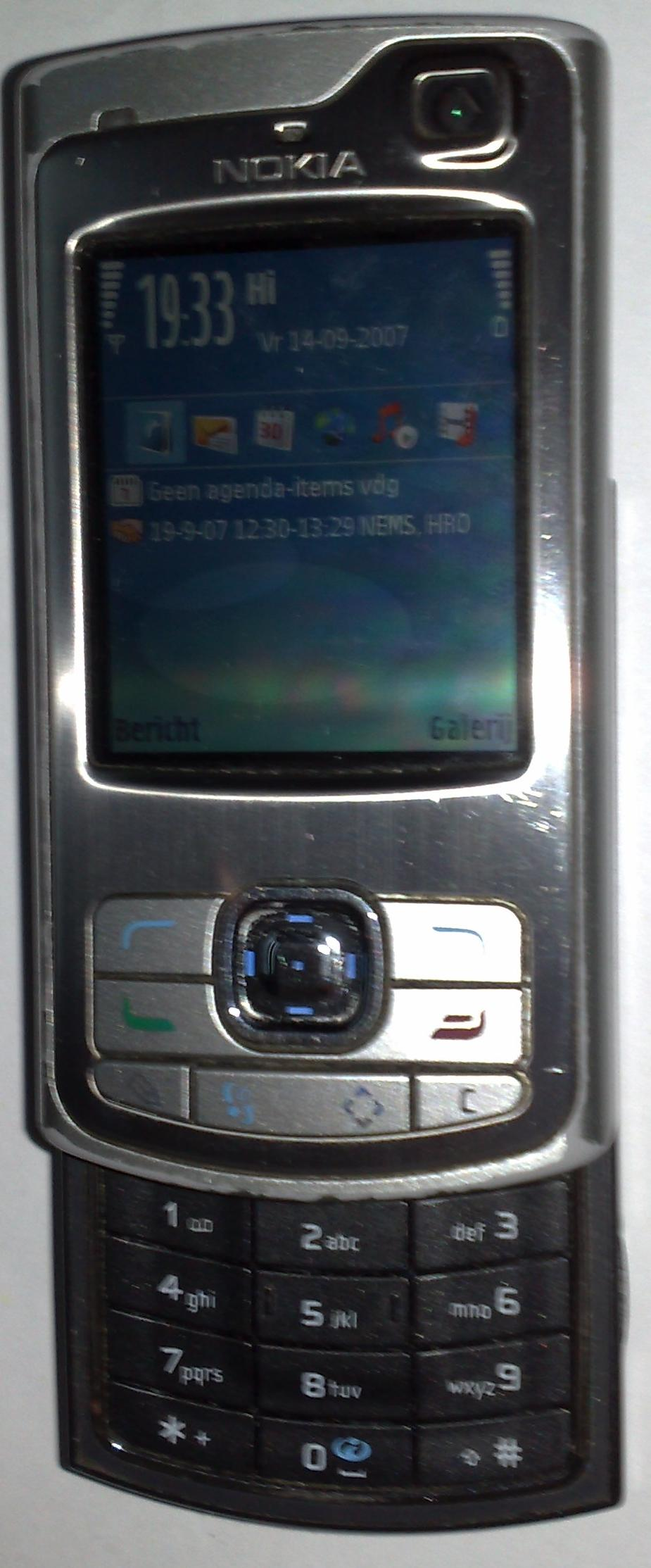
Nokia N80 with open slider

- WCDMA/UMTS 2100 MHz for Europe/Asia.
- "Internet Edition" which is available in both US and European Versions.

=== Bluetooth ===
Nokia originally announced the N80 as supporting Bluetooth 2.0, however it was released with Bluetooth 1.2. Therefore, the N80 does not currently support stereo playback over Bluetooth.

== Specification sheet ==
Feature	Specification
Form factor	Slide
Operating System	Symbian OS (9.1) + Series 60 3rd Edition
GSM frequencies	850/900/1800/1900 MHz
CPU	ARM-926 @ 220 MHz
GPRS	Yes, class 10
EDGE (EGPRS)	Yes, class 11
UMTS/WCDMA (3G)	2100 MHz
WLAN	Yes (and UPnP), 802.11b/g supported
Main screen	TFT Matrix, 262,144 colors, 352 × 416 pixels
Camera	Front 0.3 Megapixels, 2× digital zoom & Rear 3.15 Megapixels CMOS w/LED flash, 20× digital zoom (5× in video rec.)
Video recording	Yes, MPEG-4 Simple Profile at CIF and H.263 at QCIF (max. clip length 2 hours)
Multimedia Messaging	Yes
Video calls	Yes
Push to Talk over Cellular (PoC)	Yes
Java support	Yes, MIDP 2.0, CLDC 1.1
Built-in memory	40 MB
NAND Memory	128 MB
SDRAM Memory	43 MB
Memory card slot	Yes, MiniSD(or MicroSD+Adapter), 2 GB Max.
Bluetooth	Yes, 1.2; Profiles supported: Basic Printing, Generic Access, Serial Port, Dial-up Networking, Headset, Handsfree, Generic Object Exchange, Object Push, File Transfer, Basic Imaging, SIM Access, and Human Interface Device
Infrared	Yes (The Infrared feature was missing from the Nokia N70 and due to demand it was put back onto the N80)
Data cable support	Yes
Browser	WAP 2.0 XHTML/HTML
Email	Yes
Music player	Yes, stereo
Radio	Yes, stereo, visual
Video Player	Yes
Polyphonic tones	Yes, 48 chords
MP3 ringtones	Yes
HF speakerphone	Yes
Offline mode	Yes
Battery	BL-5B (3.7 V, 890 mAh)
Talk time	3 hours
Standby time	192 hours
Weight	134 g (4.7 oz)
Dimensions	95.4×50×26 mm
SAR-Rating	0.68 W/kg, 0.48 W/kg
Availability	Q1(2)/2006
Else	QuickOffice office suite / Nokia Mini Map Browser

== Internet Edition ==
The Nokia N80 Internet Edition was a second version of this handset with the same hardware as the normal N80. As of January 2007, the Pearl Black model was available for sale in the US for $499.

- Flickr
- 'Download!' App management
- Internet Telephone – SIP VOIP Frontend
- WLAN Wizard

Nokia have now announced that the new Internet Edition firmware is available for the 'classic' N80 by using Nokia Official Software Updater, downloadable from Nokia.com.

Before the Internet Edition firmware was made available on the Nokia Software Updater, end users could update the N80 to the same specification as an N80 Internet Edition by flashing the N80 with the firmware from the N80 Internet Edition. This required the use of several hacked Nokia servicing software applications, including the Phoenix Service Software (or Nokia Software Update with Nemesis (by changing product code)). This method is of questionable legality in some jurisdictions, and may violate the terms of the phone's warranty. There are reports of the occasional failure of this method due to user error or for other unknown reasons, leaving the phone in an unusable state from which only a properly-equipped service center could recover it.

== See also ==
- List of Nokia products
