= Nokia N72 =

2006 mobile phone model

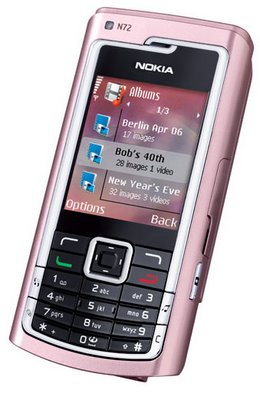
- Manufacturer: Nokia
- Availability by region: May 2006, 300 €
- Predecessor: Nokia 6681
- Successor: Nokia N77
- Related: Nokia N70; Nokia N71; Nokia N80; Nokia N90; Nokia N91; Nokia N92
- Compatible networks: GPRS, EDGE
- Form factor: Candybar
- Dimensions: 108.8×53×22 mm (4.28×2.09×0.87 in)
- Weight: 124 g (4 oz) (0.273 lb)
- Operating system: Symbian OS v8.1a, S60 2nd Edition Feature Pack 3
- CPU: TI OMAP 1710, ARM9 32-bit RISC CPU @ 220 MHz
- Memory: 20 MB
- Removable storage: DV RS-MMC / MMC-Mobile
- Battery: Li-Ion BL-5C Battery, 3.7 V, 1020 mAh
- Rear camera: 2 Megapixels, 1600 × 1200
- Front camera: No
- Display: 176 × 208 pixels 256k, matrix screen
- External display: No
- Sound: Polyphonic (64 channels), MP3
- Connectivity: Bluetooth
- Data inputs: Keypad

The Nokia N72 is a mobile phone introduced by Nokia on April 25, 2006. It runs on Symbian OS 8.1a (S60 2nd Edition FP2). It is effectively a re-branded Nokia N70 with a reduced feature set. It was released in June 2006.

== Features ==
The N72 is based upon the cut-down N70-5 variant of the N70 but with a redesigned fascia. However, it retains the same edition of the Symbian OS as the N70, as well as a similar set of features.

The Nokia N72 is a feature-rich phone with a 2-megapixel camera, a built-in flash, FM radio, Bluetooth 2.0, digital music player functionality and support for 3D Java games. It also supports Bluetooth 2.0 and USB 2.0 – Pop-Port interface. It is available in two colors namely glossy black and pearl pink.

=== External memory ===
The N72 uses Dual-Voltage Reduced Size MMC (RS-DV-MMC) cards which are also marketed as MMCmobile. The user memory for Nokia N72 is expandable up to 4 GB memory.

== Specification sheet ==
Feature	Specification
Form factor	Candybar ("Monoblock")
Operating System	Symbian OS (8.1a), S60 Second Edition Feature Pack 3 (v2.8)
Processor	TI OMAP 1710, ARM9 32-bit RISC CPU @ 220 MHz
Memory (RAM)	53 MB
Memory (PHONE MEMORY)	20 MB
GSM frequencies	900/1800/1900 MHz
GPRS	Yes, class 10
EDGE (EGPRS)	Yes, class 10, 236.8 kbit/s
WCDMA	no,
Main screen	TFT Matrix, 262,144 colour
Camera Features	Flash
Device	Smart Phone
Video Recording Frame Rate	15 frame/s
Video Recording Formats	H.263, MPEG-4
Video Recording Resolution	352 × 288
Camera Image Formats	JPEG
Graphic Formats	BMP, Exif, GIF87a, GIF89a, JPEG, JPEG 2000, PNG, WBMP
Messaging	MMS+SMIL, SMS
Supported Email Protocols	IMAP4, POP3, SMTP
Supported Document Formats	Excel, PDF, Powerpoint, Word
Audio Formats	AAC, AAC+, AMR-NB, eAAC+, MIDI Tones (poly 64), MP3, RealAudio 7, 8, 10, True tones, WAV
