= Nokia 6103 =

Nokia mobile phone

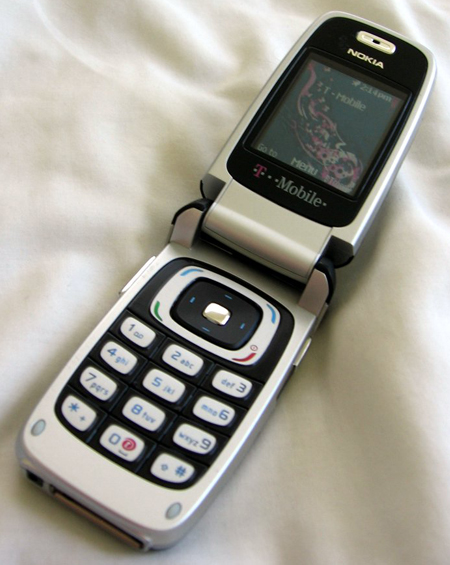
- A T-Mobile branded Nokia 6103
- Manufacturer: Nokia
- First released: 5 January 2006; 20 years ago
- Predecessor: Nokia 6101
- Successor: Nokia 6131
- Compatible networks: GSM 850 1800 1900; GSM 900 1800 1900
- Operating system: Series 40
- Rear camera: 640x480 VGA
- Display: TFT; 128x160 px 65k colors
- External display: 96x65 4,096 colors
- Connectivity: Bluetooth
- Other: FM radio

The Nokia 6103 is a mobile phone based on the Nokia Series 40 platform and the Nokia 6103 builds upon the popularity of the 6101. It features a TFT display supports up to 65,536 colors (128 x 160 pixels).The phone also has a secondary external mini display that supports up to 4,096 colors (96 x 65 pixels). More key features include Bluetooth wireless technology, FM radio and camera.

The 6103 has tri-band GSM coverage and operates on GSM 850/1800/1900 MHz or GSM 900/1800/1900 MHz depending on the region.

The 6103 features a VGA camera with a resolution of 640 x 480 pixels, suitable for basic snapshot photography.

The phone can be controlled via PC to send SMS messages, perform synchronization with Outlook, install Java apps, and more using the Nokia PC Suite.

== See also ==
- List of Nokia products
