= Nokia N75 =

Mobile phone model

- Manufacturer: Nokia
- Availability by region: 3 May 2007
- Predecessor: Nokia 6682; Nokia N71
- Successor: Nokia 6650 fold
- Related: Nokia 6290; Nokia N73; Nokia N76; Nokia N95
- Compatible networks: WCDMA 850/1900 and GSM 850/900/1800/1900 MHz
- Form factor: Clamshell
- Dimensions: 95×52×20 mm (3.74×2.05×0.79 in), 93 cc
- Weight: 123.5 g (4 oz)
- Operating system: Symbian OS v9.1, S60 Third Edition
- CPU: TI OMAP 1710 ARM-926 220 MHz
- Memory: Up to 50 MB built-in memory
- Removable storage: Up to 2 GB with microSD
- Battery: 800MaH Nokia BL-5BT battery
- Rear camera: 2 MP / 1600 x 1200 px / 8X Digital Zoom
- Display: 240 x 320 pixels, 2.4", 16M Colors
- External display: 160 x 128 pixels, 256,000 colors
- Connectivity: Bluetooth, USB-to-Pop-Port, SMS, MMS
- Data inputs: Keypad

The Nokia N75 is a clamshell-style mobile phone by Nokia, announced on September 26, 2006. It runs on Series 60 3rd Edition smartphone platform of the Symbian operating system. Nokia N75 has been made specifically for the American 3G market, supporting WCDMA/UMTS 850/1900 frequencies. It was the very first 3G Symbian as well as 3G Nokia handset to be provided by a major US carrier, with AT&T Mobility releasing it on May 3, 2007.

In addition to the US, the Nokia N75 was also available throughout the Americas in Argentina by CTI Movil, Chile by Entel, Colombia by Comcel, Dominican Republic by Claro, Mexico by Telcel, Puerto Rico by Claro and Venezuela by Movistar.

== Reception ==
CNET gave it 3/5, liking the call quality and display but disliking the battery life and camera. Mobile Tech Review gave it 4/5. PCMag gave it 2.5/5 with similar praise and criticism.
