= Nokia 6131 =

Mobile phone released in 2006

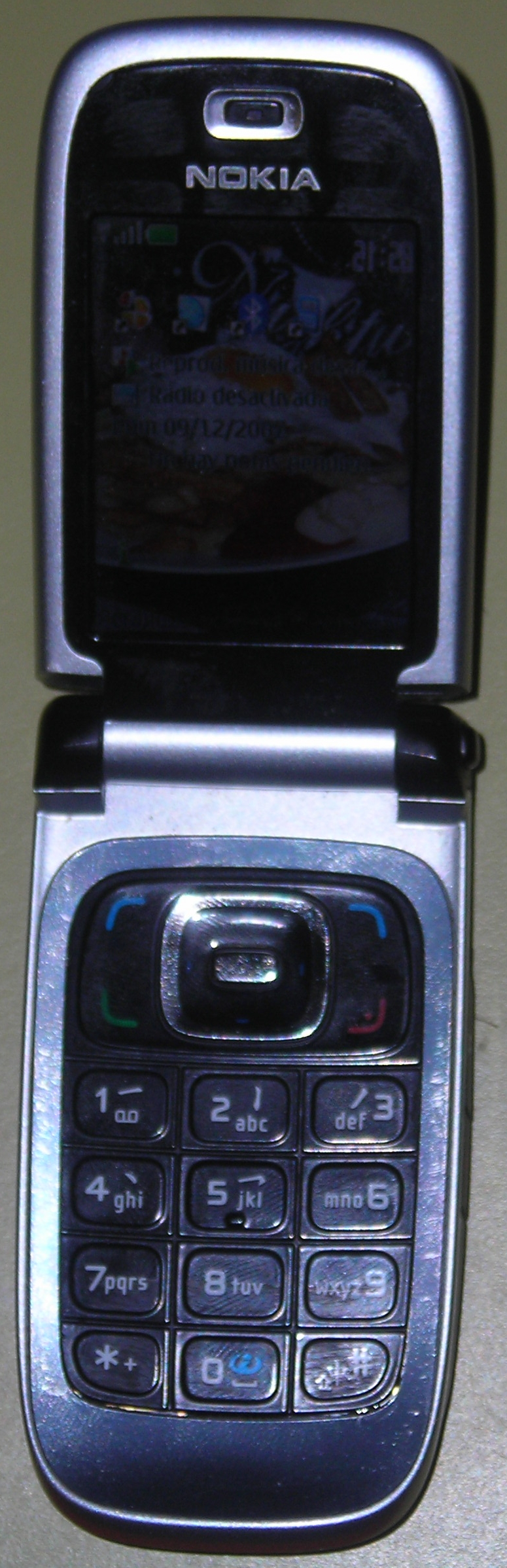
- Manufacturer: Nokia
- First released: 29 January 2006
- Availability by region: 13 February 2006
- Discontinued: Q3 2008
- Predecessor: Nokia 6103
- Successor: Nokia 6290
- Compatible networks: GSM 900 1800 1900; GSM 850 1800 1900 (US); GPRS Class 10 (4+1/3+2 slots), 32-48 kbit/s EDGE Class 10, 177.6 kbit/s
- Form factor: Clamshell
- Storage: 11 MB, 4 MB user-free
- Removable storage: MicroSD, expandable up to 2 GB
- Battery: BL-4C 860 mAh; Internal rechargeable li-ion
- Rear camera: 1.3 Megapixels
- Display: 2.2 in (56 mm) TFT; 240x320 px 16M colors
- External display: 128x160 px 256K colors
- Connectivity: Infrared; USB pop-port (CA-42); Bluetooth; NFC (6131 NFC only)
- Data inputs: Keypad
- Other: Push to Talk; FM Radio; Java MIDP 2.0; SyncML; T9 Predictive Text Input; Presence Enhanced Contacts; Calendar; Voice dial-memo Spring-load mechanism

The Nokia 6131/6133 is a clamshell cell phone introduced by Nokia on 13 February 2006. The Nokia 6131 has improvements over its predecessor, the Nokia 6101, as such, native USB connectivity (only CA-53 cable or compatible is supported), Bluetooth in addition to IrDA connectivity, SVGA vs. VGA camera.

The Nokia 6131 NFC variant was Nokia's first telephone with NFC, but not the world's first. The Panasonic P506iC with integrated FeliCa NFC was launched on NTT Docomo in 2004, starting the mobile Osaifu-Keitai (Mobile Wallet) service.

It was succeeded by the Nokia 6290 which was released in March 2007.

== Features ==
Features include a 1.3-megapixel digital camera, support for up to a two-gigabyte microSD Card, 240x320 QVGA screen with 16.7 million colors and external 128x160 TFT screen with 262,144 colors. Software includes an XHTML compatible web browser, an email client and a media player (mp3, mp4 (audio only) & 3GP supported). There is also a small button located on the top right side of the phone, that when pushed, flips the phone open.

The phone is very customizable. Users can manage many of the phone’s features in the Nokia PC Suite. Themes may also be downloaded onto the phone, changing the menus, icons, colors, etc. Other customizable aspects of the Nokia 6126 include adding MP3 files to the phone, and using those files as ringtones, without the need of converting them to WMA format. There is also a setting used for the screen saver on the external screen of the phone that allows a slide show of images the user has taken with the phones camera.

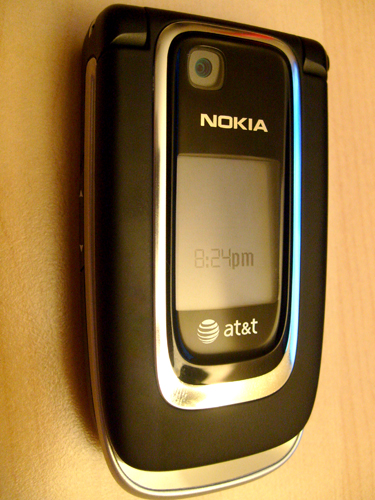
Nokia 6126 for AT&T

== Variants ==
- 6126: North American version of the 6131 (released for AT&T and Fido Solutions)
- 6131: has additional features of an FM receiver and IrDA connectivity
- 6131 NFC: includes Near Field Communication.
- 6133: has a silver keypad (vs black in 6126/6131 models), an FM receiver, and a slightly different arrangement of camera lens and external LCD screen compared to the 6126 and 6131. Only signed Java ME applications are allowed access to the network stack, with no option to change it without a crossflash to 6131 firmware. (released for T-Mobile and Rogers Communications)

== Bugs ==
=== "Sent Items" mailbox problem ===
There is/was a problem with the sent mailbox in the text messaging system which involved the messages not opening. Instead of displaying the mailbox, the system displays message that the operation was failed.

=== MMS bug ===
The 6126, 6131, and the 6133 have been known to have some problems with the sending of MMS messages. Typically, when trying to insert a picture in the message, the screen fades out with black bars, and then to a white screen and the phone returns to main screen (often known as restart). No real explanation as to why this happens has surfaced. There are various ways of fixing this problem though. Doing a full reset of the phone and not messing with the MMS settings is one. Users have been able to send messages after this, although for some, the problem arises again. Some users report that disabling message delivery reports fixes the issue. Unlocking the phone is another option. This can usually be done by shipping phone off to an unlocking website or a service center and having the service performed for a fee.

== Reception ==
Andrew Lim of CNET gave the phone a 3.5 out of 5, praising the large keypad keys, bright screen and expandable MicroSD card slot but bemoaning its lack of bundled MicroSD card, small on-screen font size and the potential problems with its spring-loaded hinge, stating in the bottom line "The Nokia 6131 is easy to use due to its large keys and bright screen. With an expandable microSD slot, storage isn't a problem and communicating with other devices is also made easy by the Bluetooth, EDGE, infrared and GPRS connectivity. Overall this phone is what Nokia should focus on: simple-to-use phones with good feature sets".

PhoneArena gave the phone a 6.1 out of 10, complimenting its big display size, solid build and good ringing volume but panning its big size and low camera quality stating "The 6131 is a typical mid-level phone and the only thing that stands out in its specifications are the displays' supported colors. Yet they do not look that good in reality. It's big-sized and relatively well built, and the opening mechanism is a big plus but closing the phone with only one hand is a problem as there are no mechanics to help you do this. The speaker made a nice impression as it's loud and clear, but the sound during a call is not that good, and the vibrating alert is too weak. We're glad that there is a music player but it lacks advanced functionality and is quite uncomfortable, unlike the Radio which has an easy to use interface."
