= Nokia 6650 fold =

Mobile phone model

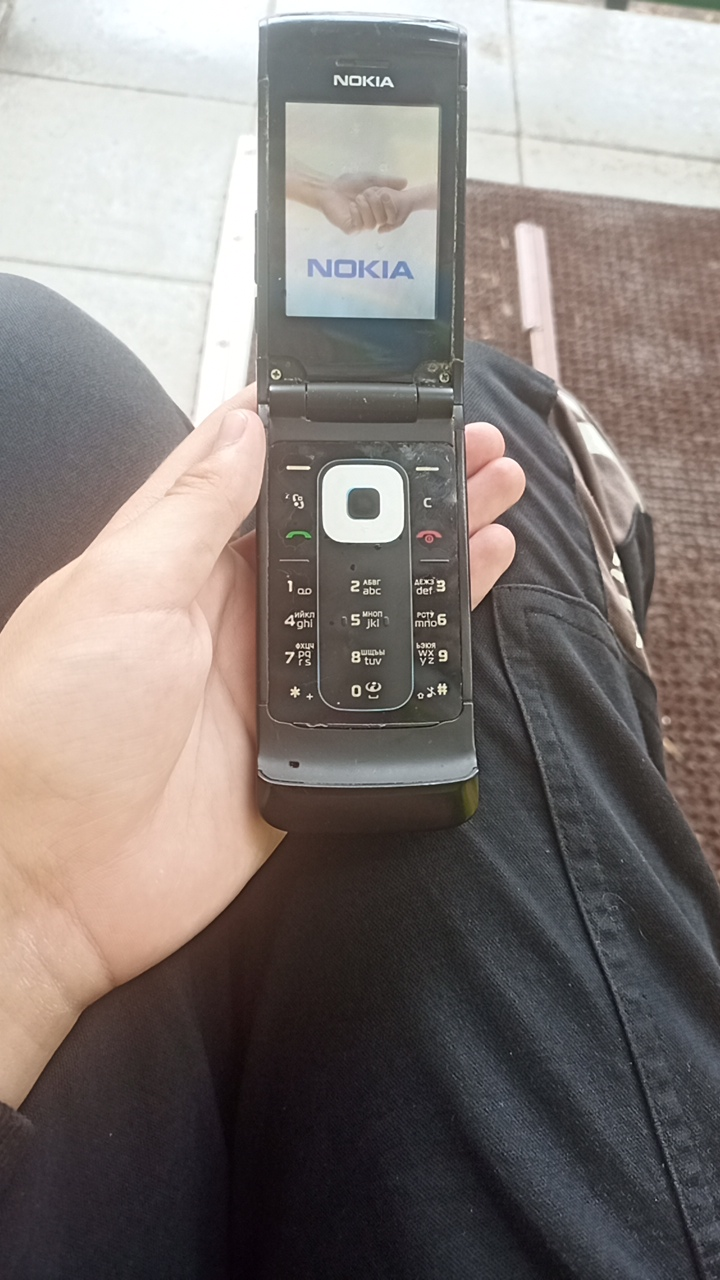
- Manufacturer: Nokia
- Availability by region: Germany (June 2008)
- Predecessor: Nokia N75; Nokia 6290
- Related: Nokia 6600 fold
- Compatible networks: GSM 850, 900, 1,800, and 1,900 MHz; HSDPA 850 and 2,100 Mhz
- Form factor: Clamshell
- Dimensions: 99.7×47×16.2 mm (3.93×1.85×0.64 in)
- Weight: 112 g (4.0 oz)
- Operating system: Symbian OS, S60 v3.2
- CPU: ARM 11, 369 MHz
- Memory: 30 MB internal
- Removable storage: microSD (up to 8 GB)
- Battery: 1.5 Ah Li-ion
- Rear camera: 2.0 megapixels (1,600×1,200)
- Display: 2.2 inches (56 mm) TFT LCD (16 million colors, 240×320)
- External display: TFT LCD (262,000 colors, 128×160)
- Connectivity: Bluetooth 2.0 with A2DP; Micro-USB 2.0
- Data inputs: Keypad; Three cover touch keys Two volume keys Camera key
- Other: A-GPS; Stereo FM radio

The Nokia 6650 fold (also known as the 6650d) is a Nokia mobile phone announced in March 2008, running the S60 platform and Symbian OS. It uses GSM 850, 900, 1,800, and 1,900 MHz networks and UMTS 850 and 2,100 Mhz networks (WCDMA/ HSDPA). Also noted as a quad-band clamshell 3G smartphone, it was released in June 2008.

Nokia 6650 fold was sold through AT&T Mobility in the U.S. and was their replacement for the N75. It was manufactured in three colors, metallic silver, black, and red. It was never a global model, and therefore it was sold exclusively for T-Mobile networks in Europe. Models were RM-324 for North America and RM-400 for Europe.

== AT&T variant ==
The AT&T variant has been heavily modified from the T-Mobile versions. It has model number 6650d-1bH with software version RM-324. The keypad has been modified, adding MediaNet (just a shortcut to the standard S60 web browser, based on Webkit), GPS, and camera keys, and moving the menu and clear keys below the send and end keys, respectively.

Also, the software has been modified to accommodate AT&T. Carrier branding is evident throughout the OS, and several applications have been changed. Nokia Maps has been replaced by AT&T Navigator, and FM Radio has been removed for XM Radio. There are also non-removable demos of Tetris, Mobile Banking, MobiTV, The Weather Channel, Midnight Pool 3D, and Diner Dash 2 have been added. The main menu also features links to Cellular Video, Yellowpages, Media Net, AT&T Mall, AT&T Music, and AT&T GPS.

The AT&T Variant is only available in silver and red.
