= Nokia 6290 =

Mobile phone made by Nokia released in March 2007

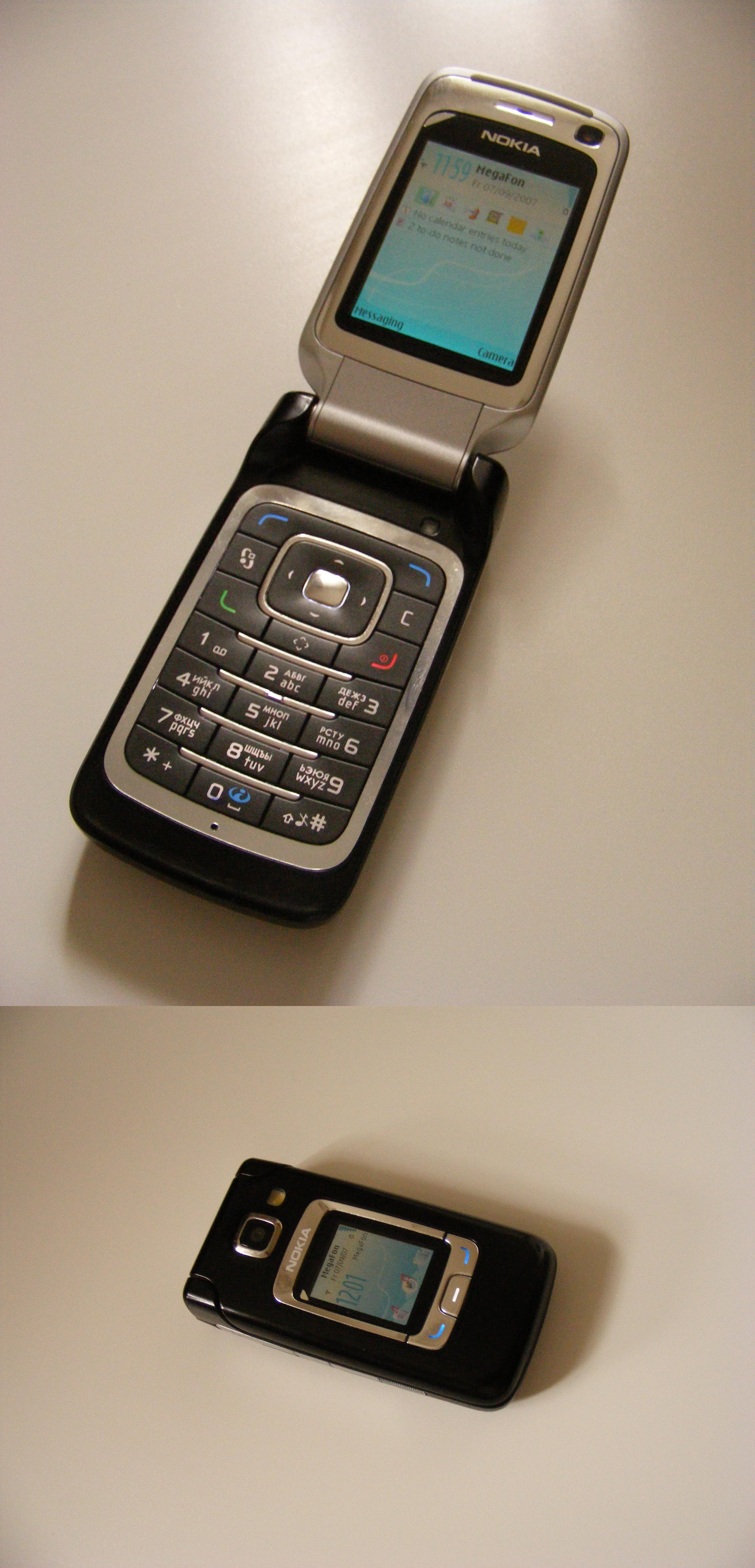
- First released: November 2006
- Availability by region: March 2007
- Predecessor: Nokia 6131
- Successor: Nokia 6650 fold Nokia N81
- Related: Nokia N75; Nokia N76
- Compatible networks: GPRS, EDGE, WCDMA
- Operating system: Symbian OS (9.2) + S60 3rd Edition Feature Pack 1
- Removable storage: microSD
- Battery: Li-Ion BL-5F
- Rear camera: 2 Megapixels
- Data inputs: Keypad

The Nokia 6290 is a multimedia 3G mobile phone made by Nokia and released in March 2007.

== Features ==
The Nokia 6290 is the first device running off S60 3rd edition platform updated to Feature Pack 1. While using the Symbian smartphone operating system, this handset is marketed as a simple 'phone' and was one of the few Nokia Symbian handsets from 2007 that was not part of the 'N' or 'E' series.

== Specification sheet ==
Feature	Specification
Form factor	Clamshell
Operating System	Symbian OS (9.2) + S60 3rd Edition Feature Pack 1
Memory (RAM) Total/Available	64/20 MB
Storage (ROM) Total/Available	128/45 MB
GSM frequencies	850/900/1800/1900 MHz
GPRS	Yes, Multislot class 32
EDGE (EGPRS)	Yes, Multislot class 32
WCDMA	Yes (2100 MHz)
Internal screen	TFT Matrix, diagonal 2,2", 16 million colours, 240x320 pixels
External screen	TFT Matrix, diagonal 1,36", 262 144 colours, 128x160 pixels
Camera	Internal 0.3 M.P 2x digital zoom & Rear 2.0 M.P (CMOS) w/photo light, 4x digital zoom
Video recording	Yes, up to 320x240
Multimedia Messaging	Yes
Video calls	Yes
Push to talk	Yes
Java support	Yes, MIDP 2.0
Memory card slot	Yes, microSD
Bluetooth	Yes V2.0
Infrared	Yes
Data cable support	Yes
Browser	WAP 2.0 XHTML / HTML
Email	Yes
Music player	Yes, Stereo speakers with 3D audio
Radio	Yes
Video Player	Yes
Polyphonic tones	Yes, 64 chords
Ringtones	Yes, Mp3, MIDI tones, AMR,(WB-AMR), True Tones, WAV, AAC, eAAC+, RealAudio
HF speakerphone	Yes
Offline mode	Yes
Battery	BL-5F (950 mAh)
Talk time	3.5 hours
Standby time	11 days (=260 hours)
Weight	115 grams
Dimensions	94x50x20.8 millimeters
Availability	Q1/2007
Else	Text to speech, Quickoffice office suite, Speaker-independent voice-dialing

== See also ==
- List of Nokia products
