= Nokia N76 =

Mobile phone model

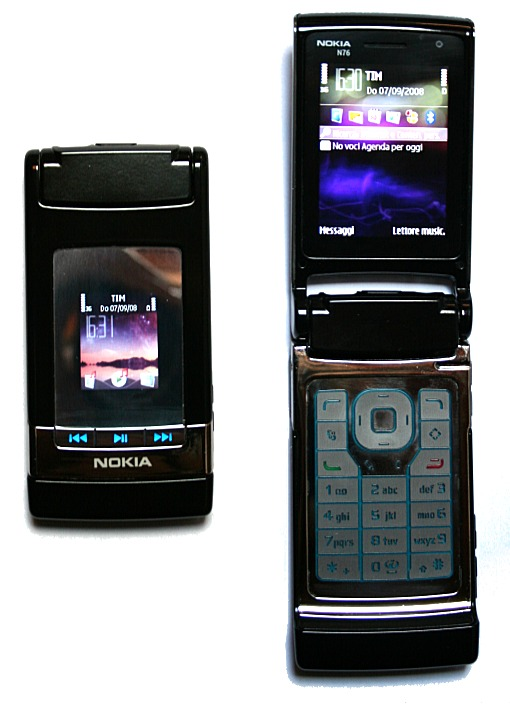
- Manufacturer: Nokia
- Availability by region: 5 May 2007
- Predecessor: Nokia 7390; Nokia N71
- Successor: Nokia N81
- Related: Nokia 6290; Nokia N75
- Compatible networks: UMTS/GSM 850/900/1800/1900
- Form factor: Clamshell
- Dimensions: 106.5 x 52 x 13.7 m, 70 cc
- Weight: 115 g (4 oz)
- Operating system: Symbian OS v9.2, S60 3rd Edition, Feature Pack 1
- CPU: Freescale ARM 11 369 MHz
- Memory: 26 MB
- Removable storage: microSD up to 2 GB
- Battery: Li-Ion 700 mAh (BL-4B)
- Rear camera: 2 MP / 1600 x 1200 px / 20X Digital Zoom
- Front camera: CIF Video Call Camera
- Display: 240 x 320 pixels, 2.4", 16M Colors
- External display: 1.8", 160 x 120 pixels, 2 colors
- Connectivity: Bluetooth, USB-to-Pop-Port, SMS, MMS
- Data inputs: Keypad

The Nokia N76 is a clamshell-style multimedia 3G mobile phone made by Nokia. It was introduced at the Las Vegas CES 2007 on 7 January 2007 and was launched on 5 May 2007 with a sales price of 390 EUR. It was advertised as "The computer done beautifully" and as a "multimedia computer". The N76 runs S60 3rd Edition (Feature Pack 1) on top of the Symbian 9.2 operating system.

With a thickness of 13.7 mm (0.54 in), the Nokia N76 was considered sleek at the time and was the slimmest Nseries smartphone to date, a record it would hold until the Nokia N8. With the N76, Nokia followed many trends such as mirrored exterior screen and Motorola Razr-like flat metal keypad. Hardware-wise the N76 bases off a platform by Freescale, being a first of kind in the family of “cheap” 3G smartphones. In fact the difference between the OMAP2420 and this Freescale CPU, is the lack of a graphics accelerator.

The phone was originally released without stereo Bluetooth, but a later firmware update v30.0.015 adds A2DP and AVRCP Bluetooth profiles. There are also numerous stability improvements and bug fixes as well as new features including the inclusion of Nokia Maps and a new search feature in active standby.

== See also ==
- List of Nokia products
