= Nokia 6101 =

Flip phone released in 2005

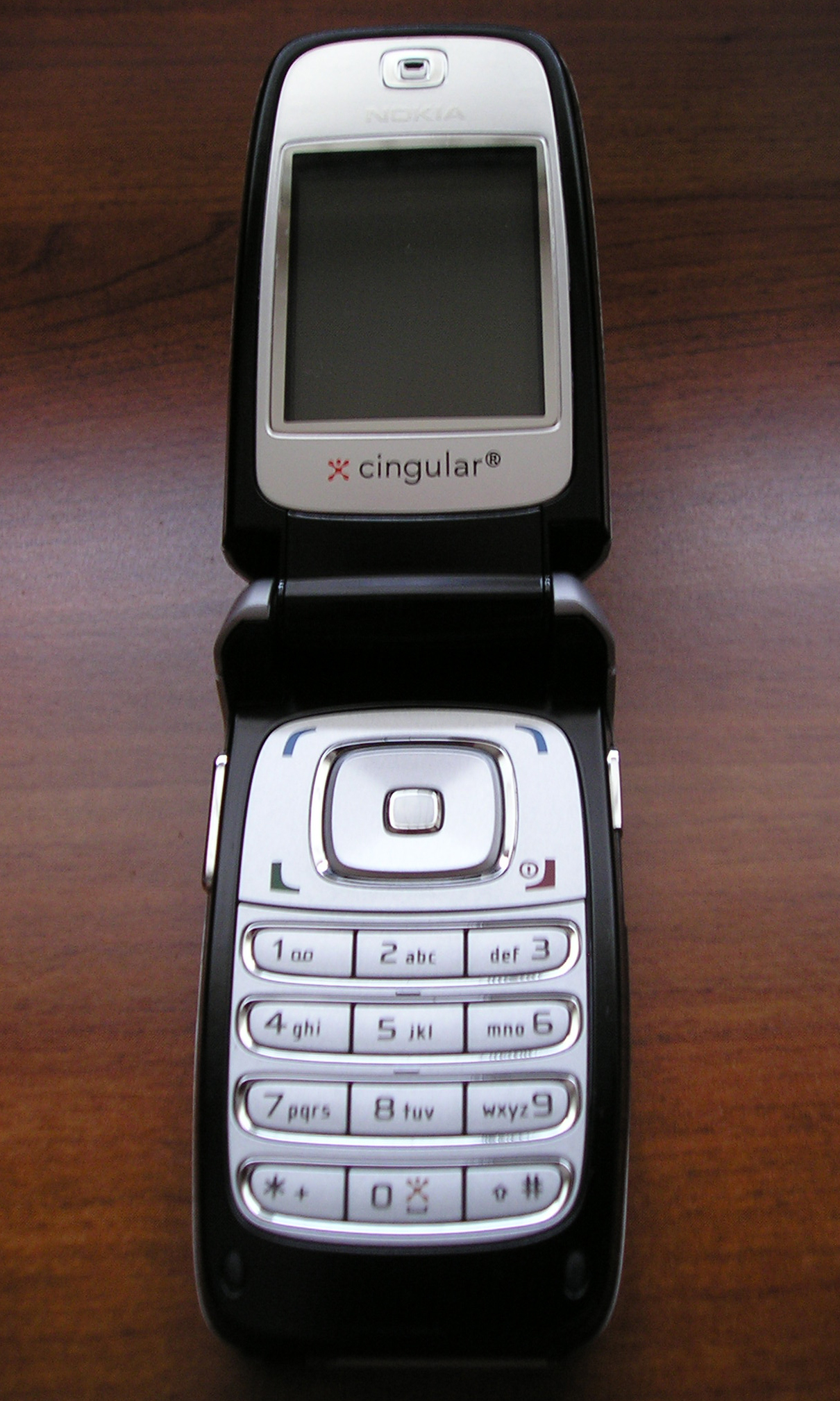
- Manufacturer: Nokia
- Predecessor: Nokia 6060
- Successor: Nokia 6103
- Compatible networks: GSM 900 1800 1900; GSM 850 1800 1900 (US); GPRS Class 10 (4+1/3+2 slots), 32-48 kbit/s HSCSD 43.2 kbit/s EDGE Class 6, 177.6 kbit/s
- Form factor: clamshell
- Battery: BL-4C; 860 mAh; Internal rechargeable li-ion
- Front camera: 640x480 px VGA video
- Display: 1.8 in (46 mm) TFT; 128x160 px 65k colors
- External display: 96x65 px 4096 colors
- Connectivity: Infrared; USB pop-port (CA-42)
- Data inputs: Keypad
- Other: Push to Talk; FM Radio; Java MIDP 2.0; SyncML; T 9 Presence Enhanced Contacts; Calendar; Built-in handsfree Voice dial-memo

The Nokia 6101, 6102, and 6102i are a line of mid-level GSM clamshell cell phones created by Nokia, announced on February 14, 2005. It was one of the last Nokia phones that still had an external antenna. The design of the 6101 was noticeably different than the company's previous flip phones that were more experimental, but with the 6101, Nokia chose a safer and established clamshell look.

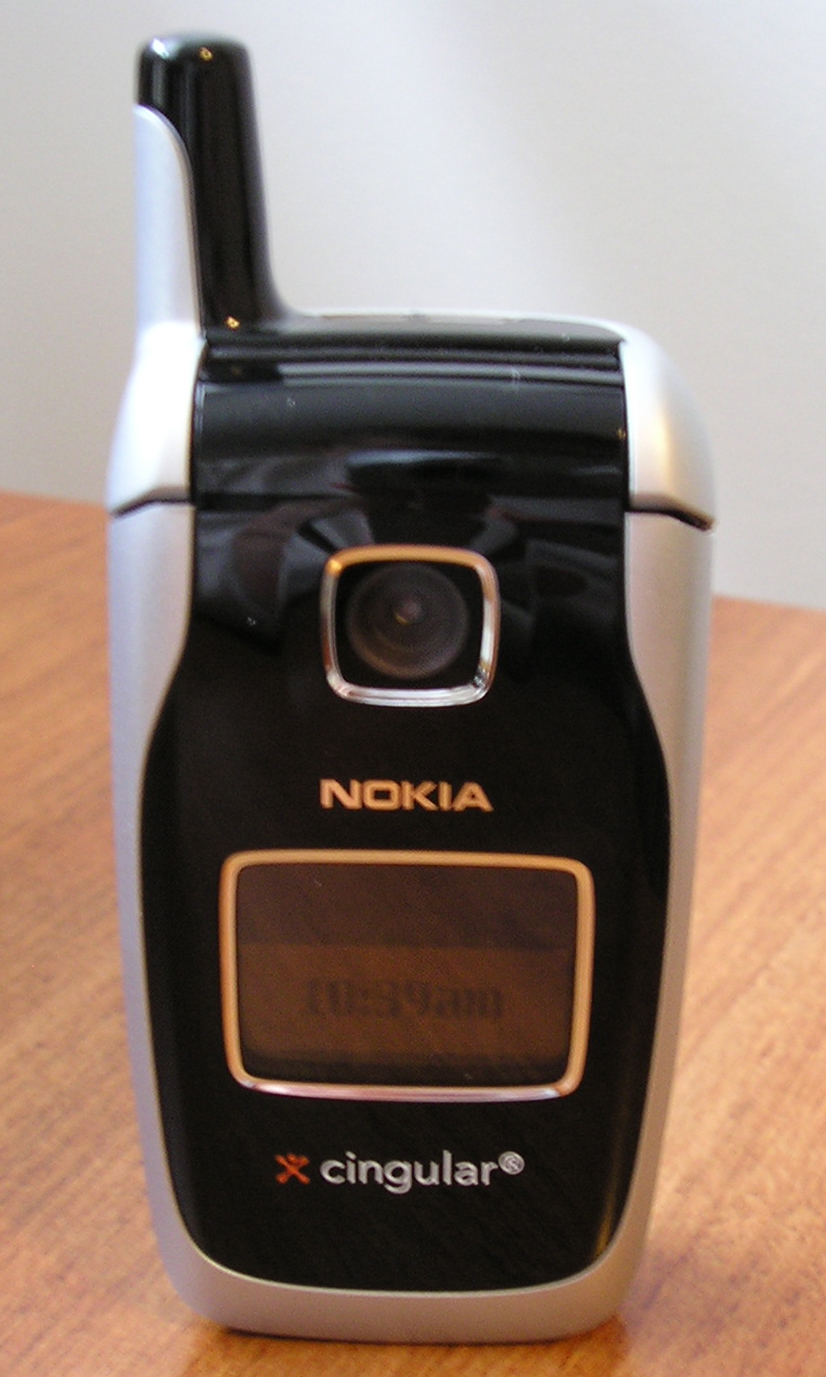
Nokia 6102i external

The differences between the 6101 and 6102 are very small and the only visible differences are the style of the keypads and front bezel plate. These were also the first Nokia flip phones to get mass market distribution in the US. It was released there in September 2005 on T-Mobile as 6101 followed by Cingular as 6102. Nokia 6102 is also the name of the version made specifically for China Mobile.

The 6102i is an updated version of the 6102 featuring Bluetooth capabilities and increased memory space. This was introduced in January 2006. Another updated version of the 6101/6102 is the Nokia 6103.

Its direct successor is the Nokia 6131/6125, which includes microSD card slot and native USB connectivity.

== Features ==
- Weight: 5 Ounces
- Dimensions: 3.35 x 1.77 x 0.95 inches (24 mm)
- Two color displays: 128 x 160 pixel internal display with up to 65,536 colors and external mini display
- Indicators for battery power and signal strength (audible indicators for both also available)
