= Nokia N70 =

Mobile phone model

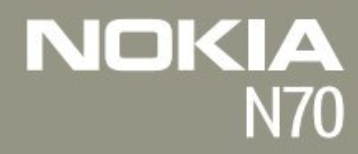

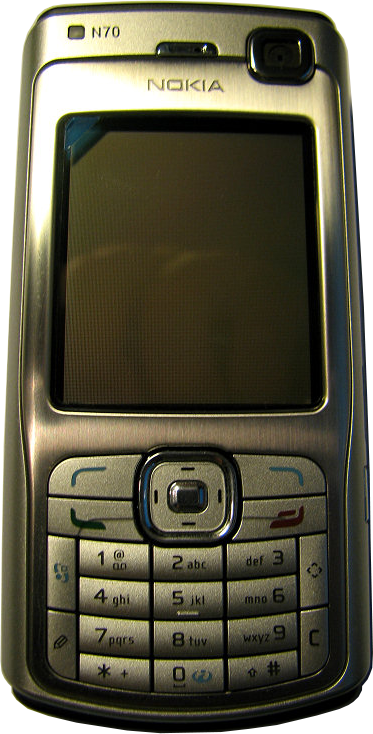
- Manufacturer: Nokia
- Availability by region: September 2005
- Discontinued: 2008
- Predecessor: Nokia 6680
- Successor: Nokia N73
- Related: Nokia N72
- Compatible networks: GPRS, EDGE, WCDMA
- Form factor: Candybar
- Dimensions: 108.8×53×21.8 mm (4.28×2.09×0.86 in), 95.9 cc
- Weight: 128 g (5 oz)
- Operating system: Symbian OS v8.1a, S60 Second Edition, Feature Pack 3
- CPU: TI OMAP 1710 ARM-926 220 MHz
- Memory: 32 MB
- Removable storage: DV RS-MMC / MMC-Mobile
- Battery: Li-Ion BL-5C Battery, 3.7V, 970 mAh
- Rear camera: 2 Megapixels (Back)
- Front camera: 0.3 Megapixels – VGA (Front)
- Display: 176 × 208 pixels, 35 × 41 mm
- Data inputs: Keypad

The Nokia N70 is a 3G mobile phone from Nokia. It was announced as part of the Nokia's new line of multimedia smartphones, the N series, on 27 April 2005. It started shipping in September 2005. It runs on the S60 2nd Edition, Feature Pack 3 on Symbian v8.1 operating system. Furthermore, it was succeeded by the Nokia N73. The N70 was popular and sold well.

== Features ==
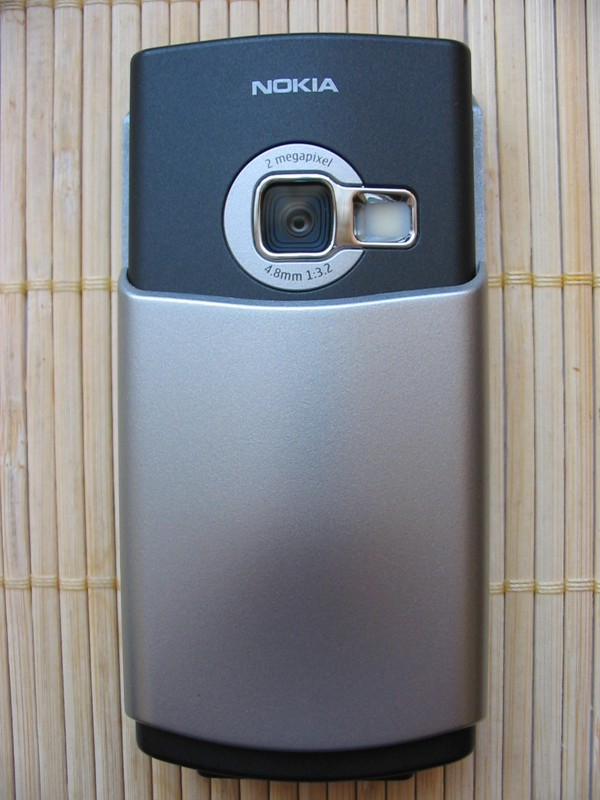
The N70 back side with open camera lens

The Nokia N70 (Model N70-1) is one of the handsets in Nokia's N series line-up of smartphones. It is equipped with a 2-megapixel camera with built-in flash, a front VGA camera for video calling, FM radio, Bluetooth, digital music player functionality, and support for 3D Symbian and Java games, as well as other S60 2nd Edition software.

At the time of its launch, the N70 had the most built-in memory alongside its system memory and was the penultimate (before the related N72) Symbian OS 8.x device released by Nokia, following the introduction of their new OS9 platform, which offered more flexibility than previous Symbian releases.

== Variants ==
=== N70-5 model ===
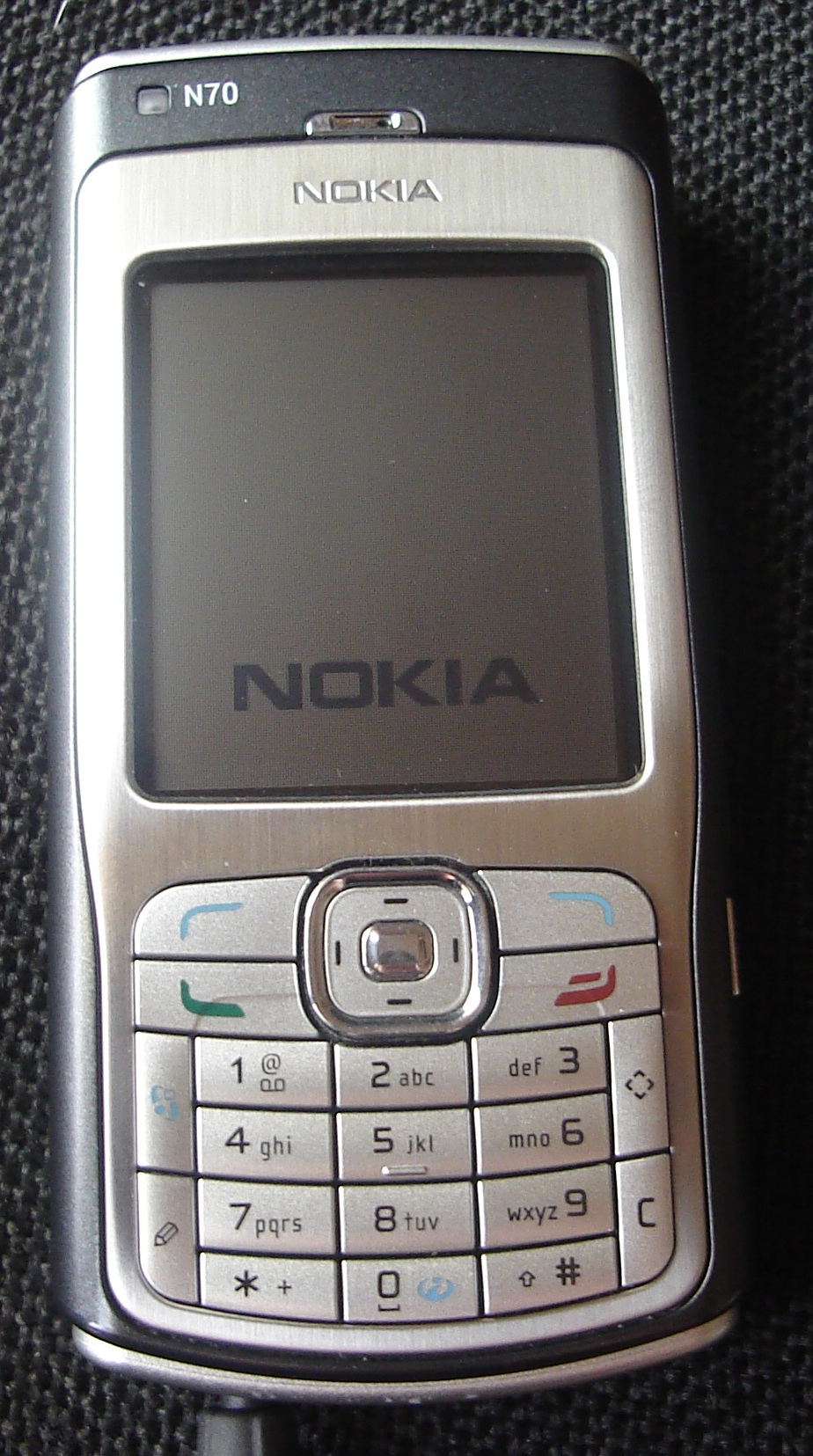
The Nokia N70-5, notice the lack of a front camera.

The N70-5 is a variant of the N70 without 3G or a front camera. It was shipped to China, Mexico and Eastern European markets and provides a lower-cost option for users who do not want or need 3G services.

=== Music Edition ===
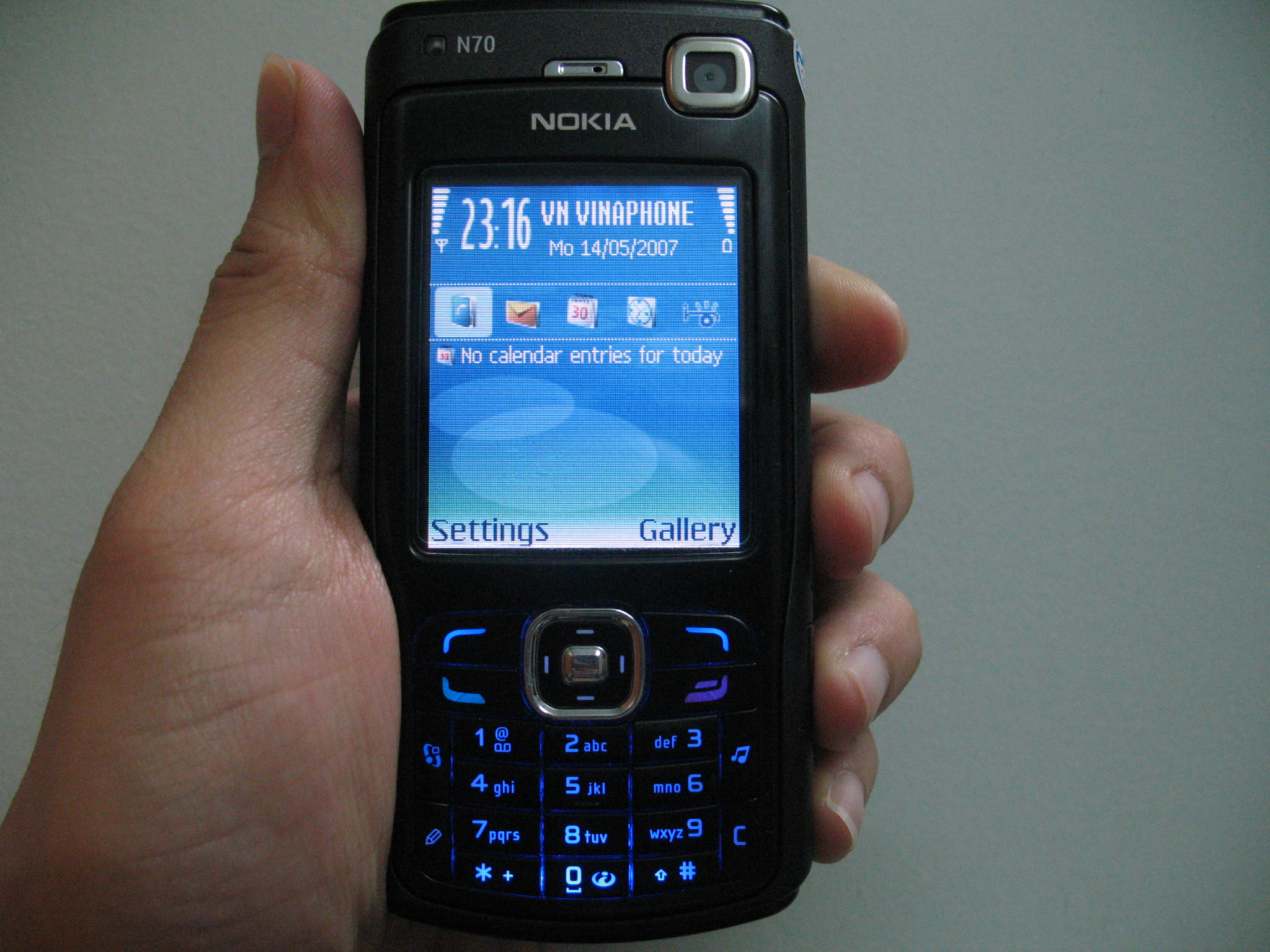
Nokia N70 Music Edition

In 2006, Nokia released its Music Edition series for N70, N73 and N91. All had black housing and new sales boxes and packages, and were special for their extra storage capacity as compared to the standard models. Music Edition of the N70-1 model featured a 1 GB memory card, 3.5 mm audio adapter with remote control (AD-41), headphones (HS-28), dedicated music button in place of the multimedia key button. The Music edition also features new themes colored in Green called Stave and colored in Red called Waveform. The speakers and the Music interface of the phone has been improved.

=== Game Edition ===
A special bundle of the N70 called the “Game Edition” was sold exclusively in retailers such as Svyaznoy in Russia and in Ukraine. The Game Edition package came with Asphalt: Urban GT 2, Real Football 2006 3D, Midnight Pool, Massive Snowboarding and Midnight Bowling.
