= Nokia Lifeblog =

- Developer: Nokia
- Stable release: 2.5.224
- Operating system: Microsoft Windows, Symbian
- Type: Blogging software
- License: Proprietary
- Website: nokia.com/lifeblog

Nokia Lifeblog is a discontinued multimedia diary and website administration tool. It automatically collected all the photos, videos, and sound clips that the user created on their mobile phone, text messages and MMS messages that were sent and received. It also allowed the user to create text and audio notes. It organized all the contents in a Timeline and rendered the diary searchable via automatically and manually created metadata, including time, location, tags, descriptions, filenames, sender and recipient information.

Lifeblog comprised a Microsoft Windows PC program and an S60 mobile phone application which synchronized with each other. The PC application also allowed the import of photos and other compatible items from devices other than mobile phones.

The PC version of Lifeblog could run independently of the phone version and was available from Nokia's Lifeblog page (now discontinued).

Both from the mobile phone Lifeblog application and from the PC Lifeblog application, users could post their data to Atom-enabled blogs such as LifeLogger, TypePad, LiveJournal, Jutut, LifeType, MediaBlog, and SaunaBlog. Photos could also be sent to a Flickr account.

Phones supported included:

- Nokia 3250
- Nokia 3230
- Nokia 6260
- Nokia 6630
- Nokia 6670
- Nokia 6680
- Nokia 6681
- Nokia 6682
- Nokia 7610
- Nokia N70
- Nokia N71
- Nokia N72
- Nokia N73
- Nokia N75
- Nokia N76
- Nokia N77
- Nokia N80
- Nokia N81
- Nokia N81 8GB
- Nokia N82
- Nokia N90
- Nokia N91
- Nokia N92
- Nokia N93
- Nokia N93i
- Nokia N95
- Nokia N95 8GB
