= Nokia 6630 =

Mobile phone

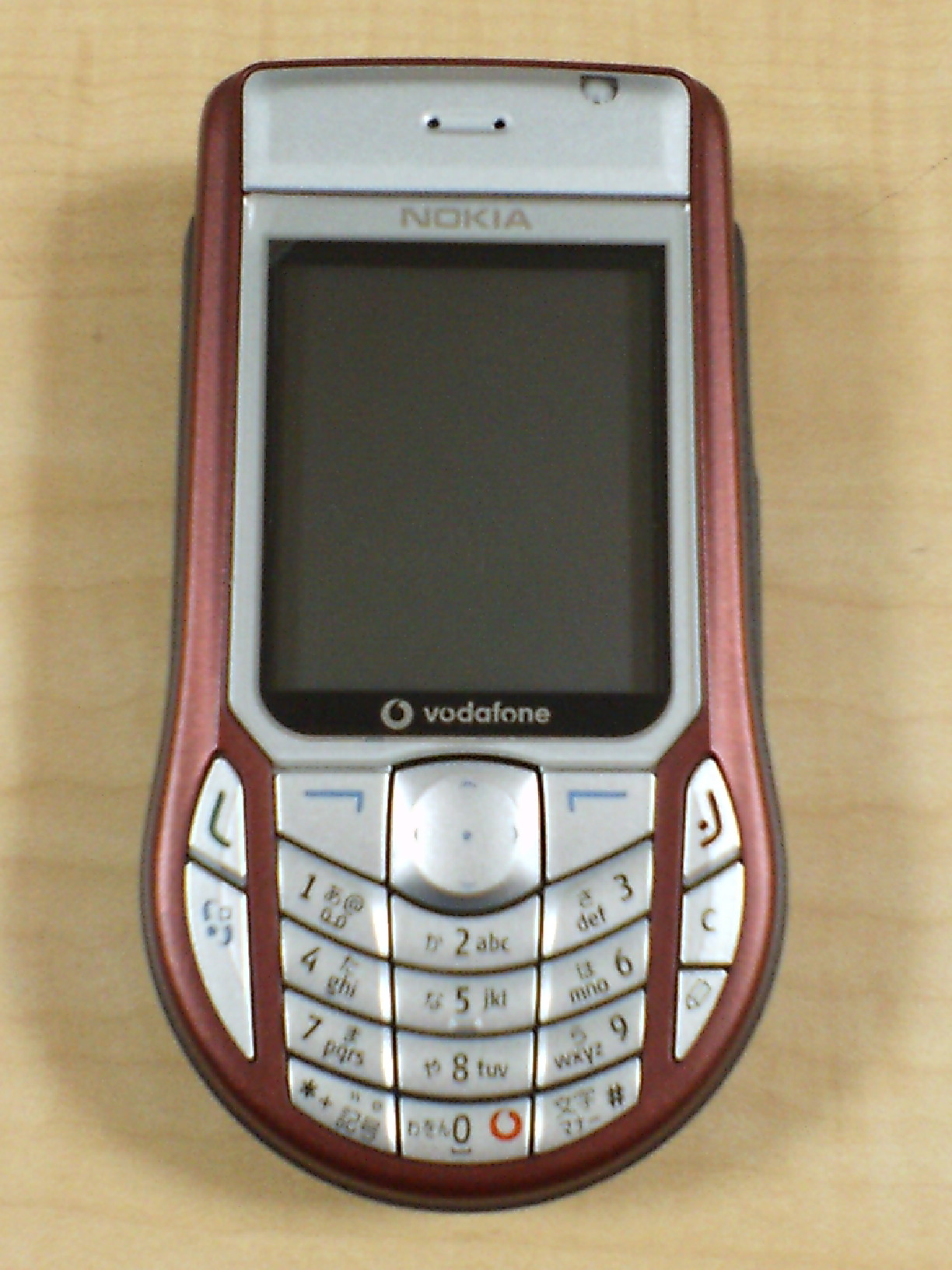
- Manufacturer: Nokia
- Availability by region: October 2004; November 2004 (Japan)
- Predecessor: Nokia 6600 (6630)
- Successor: Nokia 6680 (6630)
- Related: Nokia 6670
- Compatible networks: EDGE, GSM tri-band (900/1800/1900), UMTS 2100
- Form factor: Candybar
- Dimensions: 110×60×20.6 mm (4.33×2.36×0.81 in)
- Weight: 127 g (4 oz)
- Operating system: Symbian OS 8.0a + S60 2nd Edition FP2
- CPU: 220 MHz OMAP 1710
- Memory: 10MB
- Removable storage: DV-RS-MMC (1.8V)
- Battery: BL-5C
- Rear camera: 1.3-megapixel
- Front camera: n/a
- Display: 176 x 208, 65,536 colour, 2.1" TFT
- External display: n/a
- Connectivity: Bluetooth

The Nokia 6630 is a 3G mobile phone announced by Nokia on 14 June 2004 and released in November. It runs on Symbian OS 8.0a (Series 60 2nd Edition FP2). Codenamed Charlie during development, it is an evolution of the 6600 and 6620 smartphones, supporting tri-band GSM (run on lower operating systems).

The Nokia 6630 is the first phone ever that allows truly global roaming; previously GSM phones have had near-global coverage except in Japan where 2G phone standards were different. The 6630 automatically uses the W-CDMA network in Japan. Nokia 6650 and 7600 were also able to function in Japan, but they did not support GSM 1900, often needed in the United States and Canada (the Nokia 6651 has the GSM 1900).

Nokia says the Nokia 6630 is the first dual-mode, tri-band handset designed to work on 3G (WCDMA), EDGE and 2G networks in Europe, Asia, and the Americas.

In September 2005, Nokia introduced a 6630 “Music Edition” which retailed for 500 euros.

== Features ==
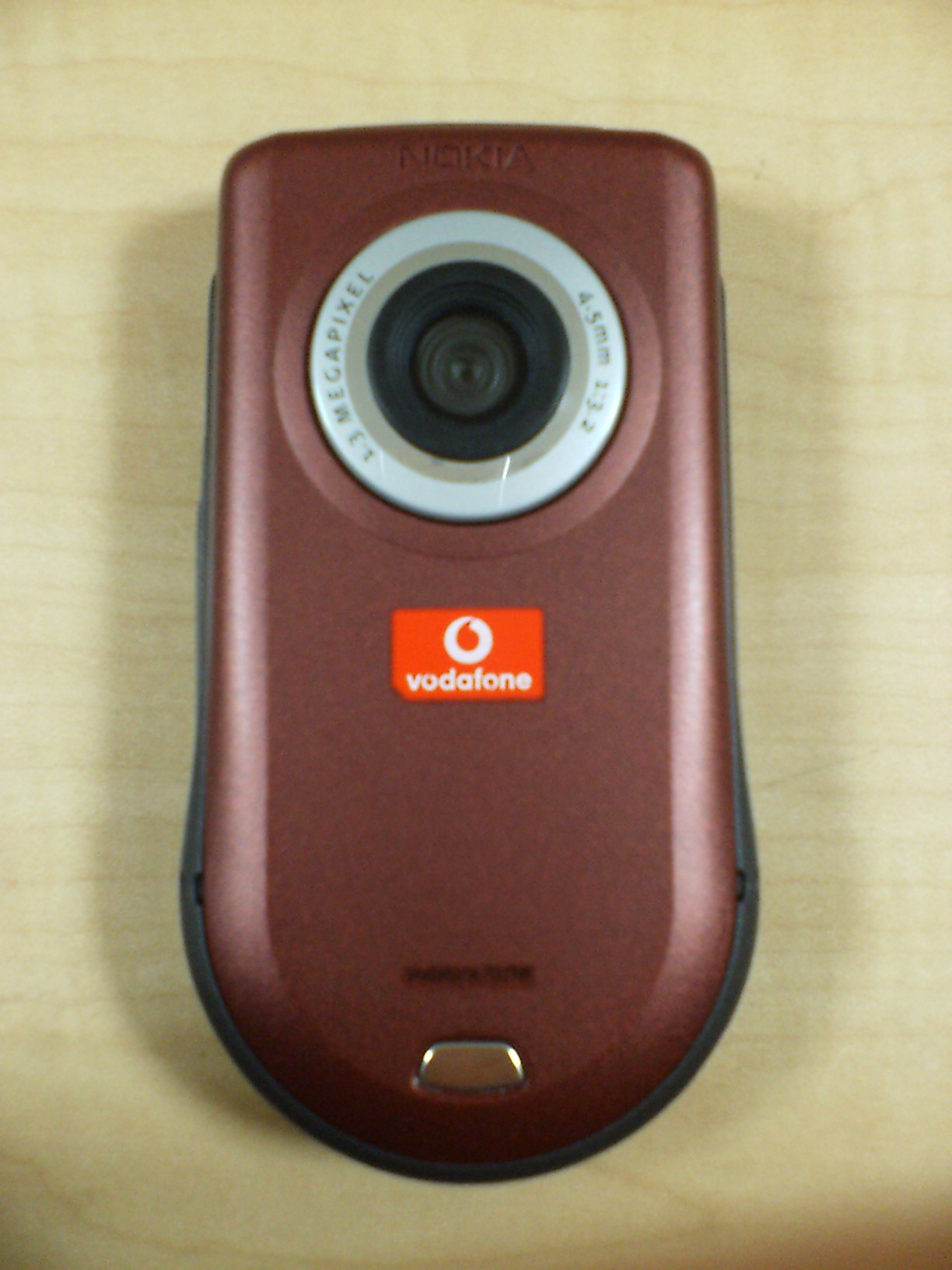
Back of the 6630 (Vodafone-branded)

Pre-installed software includes an e-mail client, a rudimentary web browser and Microsoft Office file viewer. It also includes support for MP3 and AAC playback at full quality (44.1 kHz, 16 bits, stereo), and the retail package includes stereo headphones with hands-free functionality.

As opposed to the 6600 and 6620's VGA resolution digital camera (640×480), the 6630 has a 1.3-megapixel camera (1280×960). It can record video clips at the resolution of 176×144, using H.263 video compression. Like the 6600 and 6620, the 6630 has Bluetooth capabilities and has a 176×208 pixel 65,000-color TFT LCD. It comes with a hot-swappable DV-RS-MMC card, capacity 32 MB or 64 MB, depending on the region where the phone is sold. Normal RS-MMC cards do not work with the 6630: it requires dual-voltage (1.8 V and 3.0 V) RS-MMC cards. Currently, it has been known to support up to 2 GB from a DV-RS-MMC, but may support more.

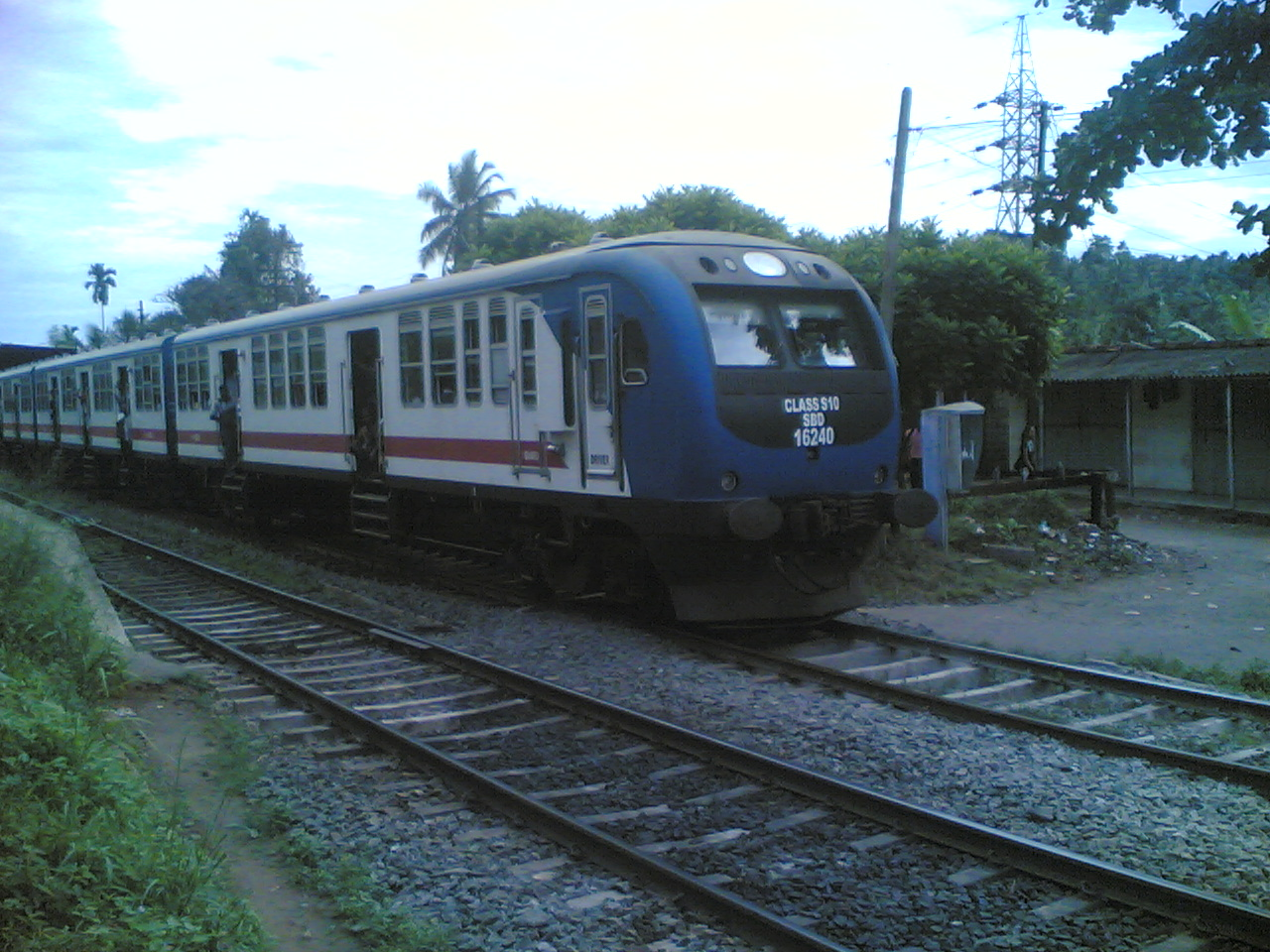
A still image of a train taken using a Nokia 6630

The 6630 is capable of video calling using the main handset camera, however, a separate forward-facing camera is not featured. Nokia released a video call stand (PT-8) exclusively for the 6630 featuring a separate camera to enable face-to-face video calling. The video call stand requires a connection to mains power using a Nokia wall charger, which restricts it to indoor 'desk-based' use. The 6630 was primarily marketed for its 3G data capabilities rather than video calling functionality. The succeeding Nokia 6680 featured a separate forward-facing camera for face-to-face video calling.

The main CPU in this smartphone is an ARM compatible chip (OMAP 1710 (ARMv5 architecture, Arm9 core)) running at 220 MHz, an unprecedented speed for a smartphone at its release. For comparison, the 6600 and N-Gage only run at 104 MHz.

== Variants ==
=== Nokia 6638 ===
The Nokia 6638 is the CDMA variant of the mainline 6630. It is mostly identical to the GSM/UMTS model, albeit with a redesigned fascia and rear panel, as well as an expandable antenna. Other notable features are Bluetooth, POP3/IMAP support with 1.2 megapixel camera.

=== Vodafone 702NK ===
The 6630 was released on the Japanese Vodafone network (now SoftBank) as the 702NK, and is basically identical to the international model apart from the carrier branding.

=== Nokia NM850iG (DoCoMo) ===
A Japanese-market variant called the NM850iG was released by NTT DoCoMo for their FOMA network in 2006.
