= Data version control (disambiguation) =

Data version control is a method for managing different versions of data.

Data version control may also refer to:

- Data Version Control (software), an open source system for versioning data

== See also ==
- Version control
- Revision Control System
