= Nokia 7610 =

2004 cell phone model

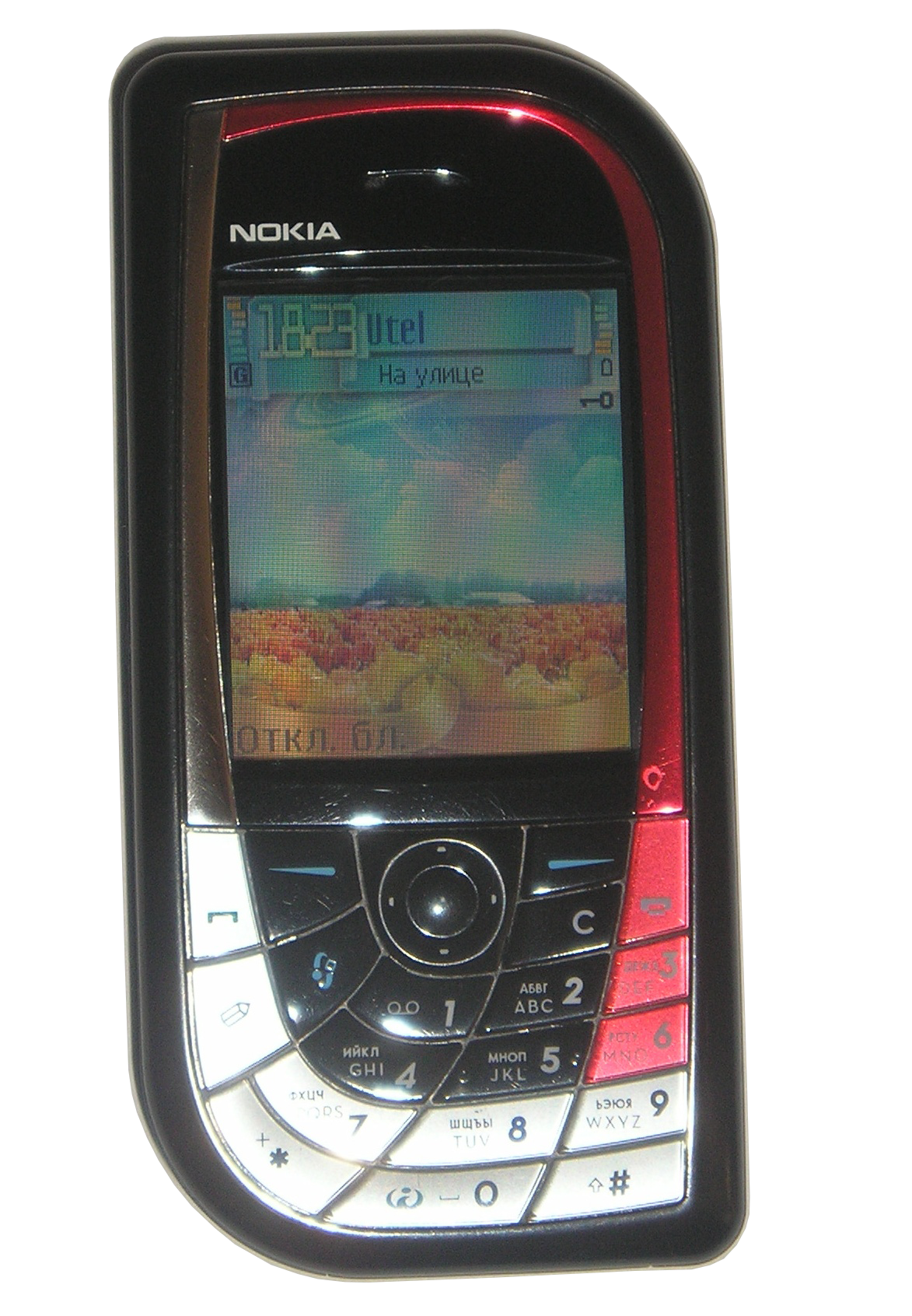
- Manufacturer: Nokia
- Availability by region: May 2004
- Predecessor: Nokia 7250
- Successor: Nokia 6681
- Related: Nokia 6620; Nokia 6670; Nokia 6680
- Compatible networks: GSM 900/1800/1900; Nokia 7610B for US: GSM 850/1800/1900
- Form factor: Bar
- Dimensions: 109×53×19 mm (4.29×2.09×0.75 in); 93 cc
- Weight: 118 g (4 oz)
- Operating system: S60 v2.1 UI on Symbian OS v7.0
- CPU: ARM4T 123 MHz
- Memory: 8 MB internal, 32 MB (8 MB free executable) RAM
- Removable storage: RS-MMC
- Battery: Li-Ion 900mAh (BL-5C)
- Rear camera: 1.0 megapixel
- Front camera: None
- Connectivity: Bluetooth v1.1 USB via Pop-Port

The Nokia 7610 is a Symbian OS mobile phone introduced at CEBIT on 18 March 2004. It features a 1 megapixel camera (1152x864 pixels) with a design similar to 2003's Nokia 7600. It went on sale with a list price of €500 and came with a 64 MB MMC card. It runs on Nokia's Series 60 platform (version 2.1). It was marketed as a stylish and imaging device, and allowed direct Bluetooth photo printing. End-users can also use the 7610 with Nokia Lifeblog. Other pre-installed applications include the Opera Mobile web browser, RealPlayer and Kodak Photo Sharing.

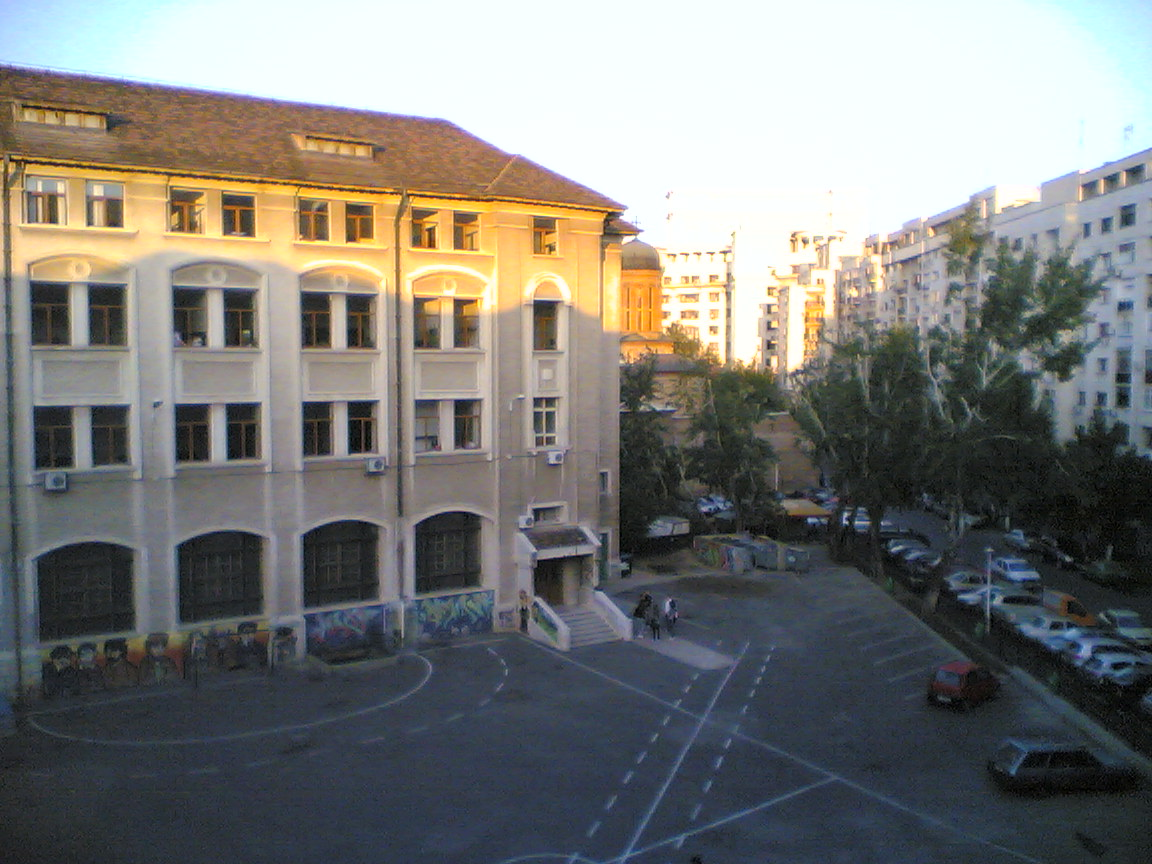
Picture taken with Nokia 7610

The Nokia 6670 is the same phone with a more conventional keypad layout, and slightly different pre-installed software, aimed at business users.
