= Muvee Reveal =

Video editing software program

muvee Reveal
- Developer: muvee Technologies
- Stable release: 2017 / January 9, 2017; 9 years ago
- Operating system: Microsoft Windows
- Type: optical disc authoring software
- License: Trial
- Website: www.muvee.com/en/products/reveal

muvee Reveal is proprietary video editing software program for Microsoft Windows created by Singapore-based muvee Technologies. Reveal creates video slideshows from input videos, photos, and music. Muvee Reveal 7 was first released in 2007 and is the modern successor to the award-winning muvee autoProducer title first released by muvee Technologies in 2002. Since 2009, versions of muvee's Reveal movie making software use CUDA for faster processing and rendering.

muvee Reveal has been downloaded over a million times while OEM versions of the software were installed on over 24 million on HP computers, Dell PC and Notebooks, bundled with Nikon One and Coolpix, Flip, Olympus, Sony Cybershot and Panasonic Lumix cameras, Seagate FreeAgent and Toshiba Canvio external hard drives , Coby camcorders since 2004.

== Features ==
Partial List of Features in muvee Reveal:

- Insert photos and video
- Add opening Titles, intertitles, and end Credits with free fonts
- Place captions and subtitle lower-thirds on photos and videos.
- Add any music and mark desired sections
- Fit video to music length
- Add an editing template Style which adds effects, transitions and pacing information
- Voice-over with music-voice-sfx mixer
- magicMoments for Video to mark up essential segments of video
- magicSpot for Photos to mark start and end points for a Ken-Burns effect on photos
- Chapters: create sections where different music and Styles can be used

== Output formats ==
Output formats include:

- WMV
- MOV
- MPEG-1
- DV-AVI
- AVI
- MPEG-2
- H.264
- MPEG-4

== See also ==
- List of video editing software
- Comparison of video editing software
- MPEG-4 Part 14
