= DVC =

DVC can refer to:

- Damodar Valley Corporation, India
- Deer–vehicle collisions
- Deputy Vice-Chancellor of a university
- Diablo Valley College, California, US
- Digital Video Cassette, later MiniDV
- Diligentia, Vis, Celeritas, Latin for "Precicion, Power, Speed", the motto of the International Practical Shooting Confederation
- Disney Vacation Club, a vacation timeshare company
- Divers centre (abbreviated as DVC), Miscellaneous centre, designation for a centrist candidate without political party in France.
- Data Version Control

== See also ==
- DVC 1, a submarine
