= YAML (framework) =

CSS framework

- Developer: Dirk Jesse
- Stable release: 4.1.2 / July 28, 2013; 13 years ago
- Written in: HTML, CSS and JavaScript
- Platform: Cross-browser
- Type: CSS framework
- License: CC-BY 2.0, paid subscription models for comercial use
- Website: yaml.de
- Repository: github.com/yamlcss/yaml

YAML (Yet Another Multicolumn Layout) is a cross-browser CSS framework. It allows web designers to create a low-barrier website with comparatively little effort. Integrations of the YAML layouts have been created for various content management systems. These include WordPress, LifeType, TYPO3, Joomla, xt: Commerce and Drupal.

As of YAML version 2.2, the framework is distributed under the Creative Commons Attribution 2.0 License (CC-BY 2.0). As an alternative for commercial use of the framework, there are two paid subscription models.

== CMS templates on YAML basis ==
There are a number of templates for the YAML framework, including for various content management systems and e-commerce systems such as:

- TYPO3
- Drupal
- Joomla
- Zikula
- DotNetNuke
- xt:Commerce
- phpwcms
- ExpressionEngine
- Contenido
- MODX
- Papaya CMS
- PostNuke
- Serendipity
- Contao (TYPOlight)
- WordPress
- ZMS

== YAML Builder ==
The YAML framework includes the YAML Builder for creating YAML-based CSS layouts. It is a WYSIWYG application that displays the layout in the browser and outputs the HTML and necessary CSS for the specific design.

== See also ==
- Comparison of browser engines
