= Muvee Technologies =

muvee Technologies
- Company type: Private
- Industry: Video editing software
- Founded: Singapore (1999)
- Headquarters: Singapore, San Francisco, Tokyo, Seoul
- Key people: Terence Swee, CEO & Co-founder
- Website: www.muvee.com

muvee Technologies is a Singapore-based company, best known for its video editing software for Windows. In 2001, muvee launched the award-winning autoProducer for PCs and in 2005, became the first to offer mobile video editing software on the Symbian 3 platform for the Nokia 7610. In 2006, it announced its automatic slideshow creation engine in the Nikon Coolpix S5. In 2014, muvee launched Action Studio, a mobile video editing app for action cam users, and ReAction, an app which creates slow-mo video sequences for both iOS and Android.

muvee's technologies have shipped on over 750 million devices. Strategic partnerships with leading brands in PCs, mobile, and imaging devices include Samsung, LG, HTC, Sony, Alcatel, Nikon, Nokia, HP, Dell and Olympus.

muvee's automatic video editing solutions are delivered to handset OEMs, social networks and partners as an SDK or complete applications and various apps are available in Android and iOS app stores globally.

muvee also developed the Action Cam App for Sony's Action Cam series, available on both the iOS AppStore and Google Play

== Products ==
- muvee Reveal
- muvee Reveal Business
- Action Studio (iOS and Android)
- ReAction Slomo Video Creator (iOS and Android)
- muvee 360 Video Stitcher for Samsung Gear 360 (Mac)
- Turbo Video Stabilizer
- Turbo Video Cutter

== Technology ==
The "Artistic Intelligence" engine built in to muvee automatically creates movies that are called "muvees". Using advanced signal processing techniques, videos and photos are automatically analyzed for scene boundaries, human faces and other proprietary metrics. Chosen music tracks are also analyzed for its music beats and its Emotional Index™. Users can choose one of several editing Styles and a muvee is automatically generated, with its effects and transitions synched to the beat and emotional contours of the music. Editing Style templates are authored by actual professional film producers and a rich library is available. Each Style contains a mix of effects and transitions that are applied to the videos and photos, in synchronization with the music.

muvee announced CODEN in 2010, which enables the fast trimming of HD videos in under-powered phones. Previously, it had been deemed impossible to edit videos in low-mid range feature phones. Meanwhile, with higher end Smartphones, while there is more memory and processor power, video is captured in up to 4K which allows the pixels involved to grow exponentially faster than the CPU power. To combat this limitation, muvee engineers took ideas from the procedures of minimally invasive heart surgeries and created new methods to surgically manipulate video files without having to decompress them. This patented technology is now available to Device Makers as an Application Development Kit (ANSI C), alongside corresponding Video Renderers, Codecs and GUI abstraction layers for application development in the device maker's proprietary environments and chipsets.

In 2014 muvee released their Android mAMS (muvee Advanced Multimedia SDK) which targeted software developers and mobile handset makers and allows for the quick creation of multimedia applications for Androids. It contains modules to support all basic video, image and audio manipulation operations that are typically needed in a multimedia application, including trimming, splitting, joining of video clips, balancing audio and music, sound effects, fast transcoding, adding overlays with transparencies, generating thumbnails and so on.

== Company history ==
muvee Technologies was founded by Terence Swee, a Singaporean electronic engineer and Dr. Pete Kellock, a Scotsman with a doctorate in electronic music. The founders began working together in 1999 at Kent Ridge Digital Labs (KRDL), a technology business incubator sponsored by the Government of Singapore.

== See also ==
- Video editing software
- Comparison of video editing software
- List of video editing software
