= Nokia 3650 =

Cell phone model introduced in 2002

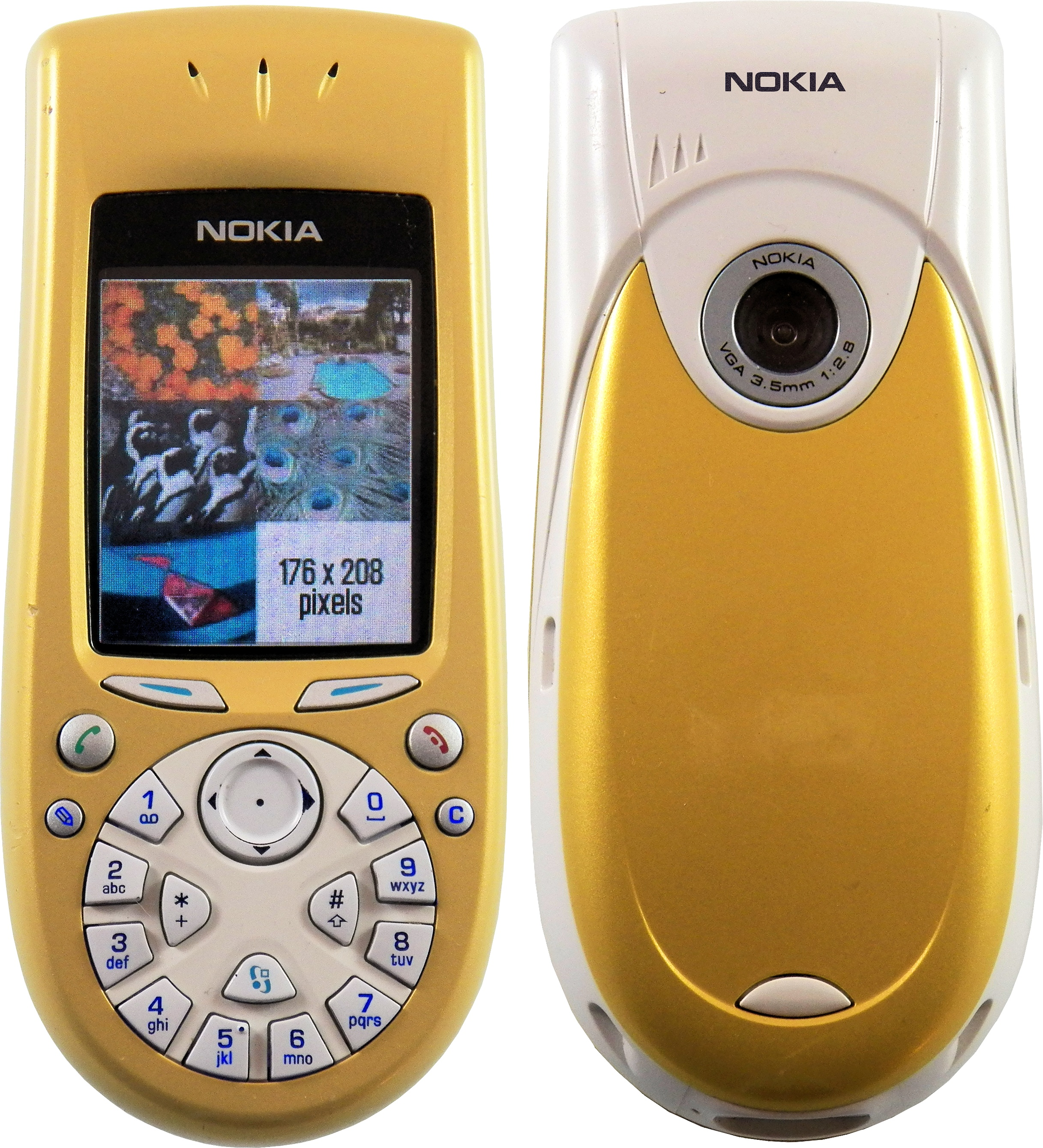
- Manufacturer: Nokia
- Type: Smartphone
- First released: February 2003; 23 years ago
- Discontinued: 2006
- Predecessor: Nokia 7650
- Successor: Nokia 3230 (3650 and 3660); Nokia 6620 (3600 and 3620)
- Related: Nokia 3600; Nokia 3620; Nokia 3660
- Compatible networks: GSM 900/1800/1900
- Form factor: Bar
- Dimensions: 130 mm (5.1 in) H 57 mm (2.2 in) W 26 mm (1.0 in) D 139 cm^{3}
- Weight: 130 g (4.6 oz)
- Operating system: S60 1st Edition
- CPU: 104 MHz UPP_WD2, ARM9
- Memory: 8 MB
- Storage: 24 MB, 3.4 MB available to user
- Removable storage: MMC, up to 4 GB
- SIM: miniSIM
- Battery: Nokia BL-5C, 850 mAh, 3.7 V user replaceable Li-ion
- Charging: Nokia 3.5-mm DC Charging Interface
- Rear camera: 0.3 MP (640×480 max.); Video recording
- Display: 2.1 in (53 mm) diagonal TFT LCD; 176 × 208 px 4096 colors
- Sound: Mono speaker, line-out (proprietary)
- Connectivity: Bluetooth 1.1 with HFP, HSP, OPP and DUN; IrDA
- Data inputs: Keypad
- Made in: Finland

The Nokia 3650, sold in North American markets as the Nokia 3600 (triband GSM 850/1800/1900 MHz), is a mobile phone from Nokia announced on 6 September 2002 as the successor to the Nokia 7650. It runs Symbian OS Series 60 (version 1.2).

A distinctive feature of the 3650/3600 was its unique circular keypad. Many owners would have preferred a Series 60 device with a conventional keypad, however some stated that the rotary style keypad made text messaging easier and faster. This device improved on several things compared to 7650, such as expandable memory, improved battery, and camcorder capability, and it retailed for a lower price upon release in early 2003. It also had support for Xpress-On covers.

The 3600 was the first Symbian OS device to appear in American markets. It was also the first phone with an integrated camera announced for the North American market.

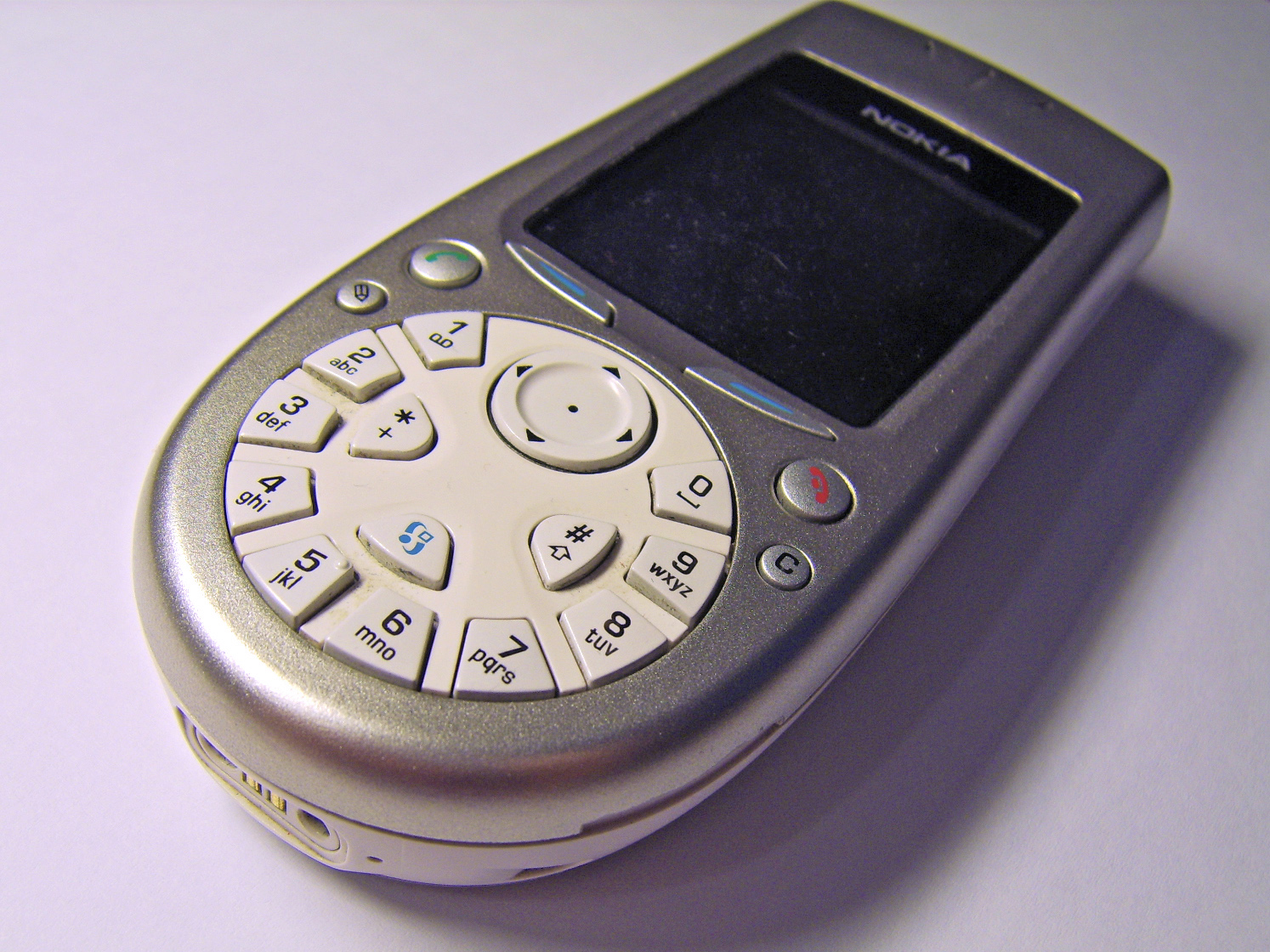
A Nokia 3650

Improved versions called the Nokia 3660/3620 were announced a year later. By that time the business-oriented Nokia 6600 was released as the company's flagship Series 60 smartphone. The official successor to the 3660 was the Nokia 3230; no official successor was released for the 3620, however, it was replaced in the Cingular Wireless (now AT&T Mobility) lineup by the Nokia 6620 shortly after their acquisition of AT&T Wireless Services.

== Variants ==
=== Nokia 3660/3620 ===
A hardware revision of the 3600 series called the Nokia 3660 (or 3620 in North America), was announced on October 9, 2003 to replace the 3600 and 3650, addressing complaints by some users over the original phone's circular keypad design. As with the original 3600/3650, the 3620/3660 run on Series 60 version 1.x on Symbian OS.

Changes from the 3600/3650 include a conventional keypad (as opposed to the 3650's circular keypad), and a 16-bit display (as opposed to the 3650's 12-bit display).

Both the 3620 and 3660 are basically the same phone, except that the Nokia 3620, being targeted at the US market, operates on GSM 850/1900, while the Nokia 3660, a European phone, operates on GSM 900/1800/1900.
