= Nokia 6670 =

Mobile phone model

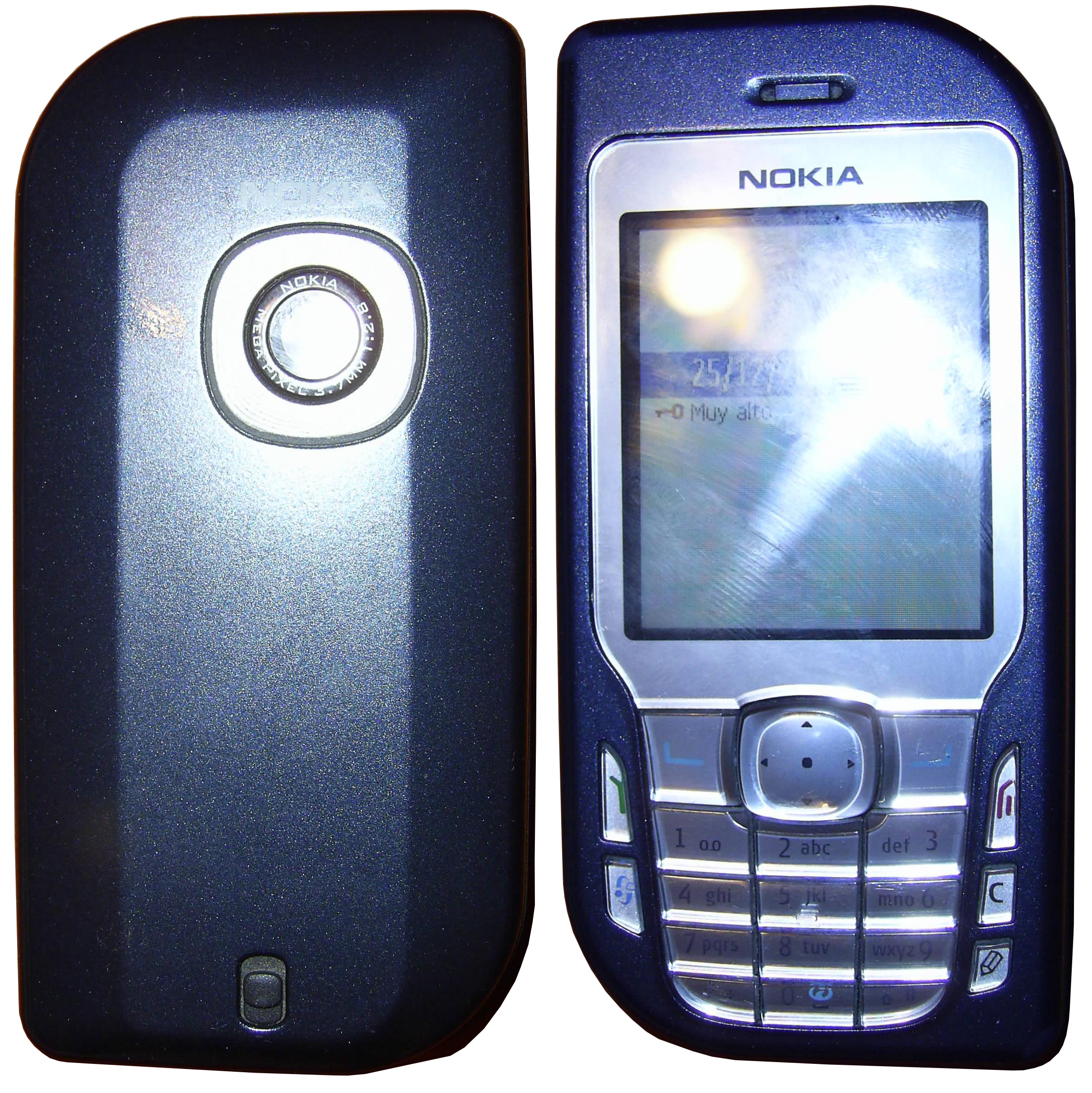
- Manufacturer: Nokia
- Availability by region: 2004
- Predecessor: Nokia 6100
- Successor: Nokia 6681
- Related: Nokia 7610; Nokia 6680
- Compatible networks: GSM tri-band 900/1800/1900 Europe; 850/1800/1900 America
- Form factor: Candybar
- Dimensions: 108.6×53×20.9 mm (4.28×2.09×0.82 in)
- Weight: 120 g (4 oz)
- Operating system: Symbian 7.0s
- CPU: 32-bit RISC CPU, ARM-9 family at 123 MHz
- Memory: 8 MB
- Removable storage: RS-MultiMediaCard 64 MB
- Battery: BL-5C Battery Li-ion 900 mA·h
- Rear camera: 1 megapixel, 4x digital zoom
- Display: TFT 176 x 208 pixels, 65,536 colours

The Nokia 6670 is a mobile phone from Nokia announced on September 24, 2004. Based on the Series 60 platform on Symbian OS, the phone is a tri-band more conservatively styled business version of the fashion-oriented Nokia 7610, and features a 1.0 megapixel digital camera, 8MB of storage (as well as RS-MMC expansion slot) and a 65,536 colour 176x208 TFT screen. Software includes viewers for Microsoft Word, Excel, PowerPoint and PDF files, a full HTML compatible web browser, and a GPS-like application that generates positioning information from the GSM cell data. The Series 60 platform allows for many programs to be added, and also with the inclusion of Java Apps and Games. Its 123 MHz ARM-9 processor can handle many applications at a time, and it can calculate 16000 fibonacci numbers in 35 seconds, as calculated using FPC Bench.

Today, it is one of the rarest Nokia devices.

== Related handsets ==
- Nokia 6600
- Nokia 6620
- Nokia 6630
- Nokia 7610
- Nokia 6680/81/82
