= Nokia 7650 =

Mobile phone model

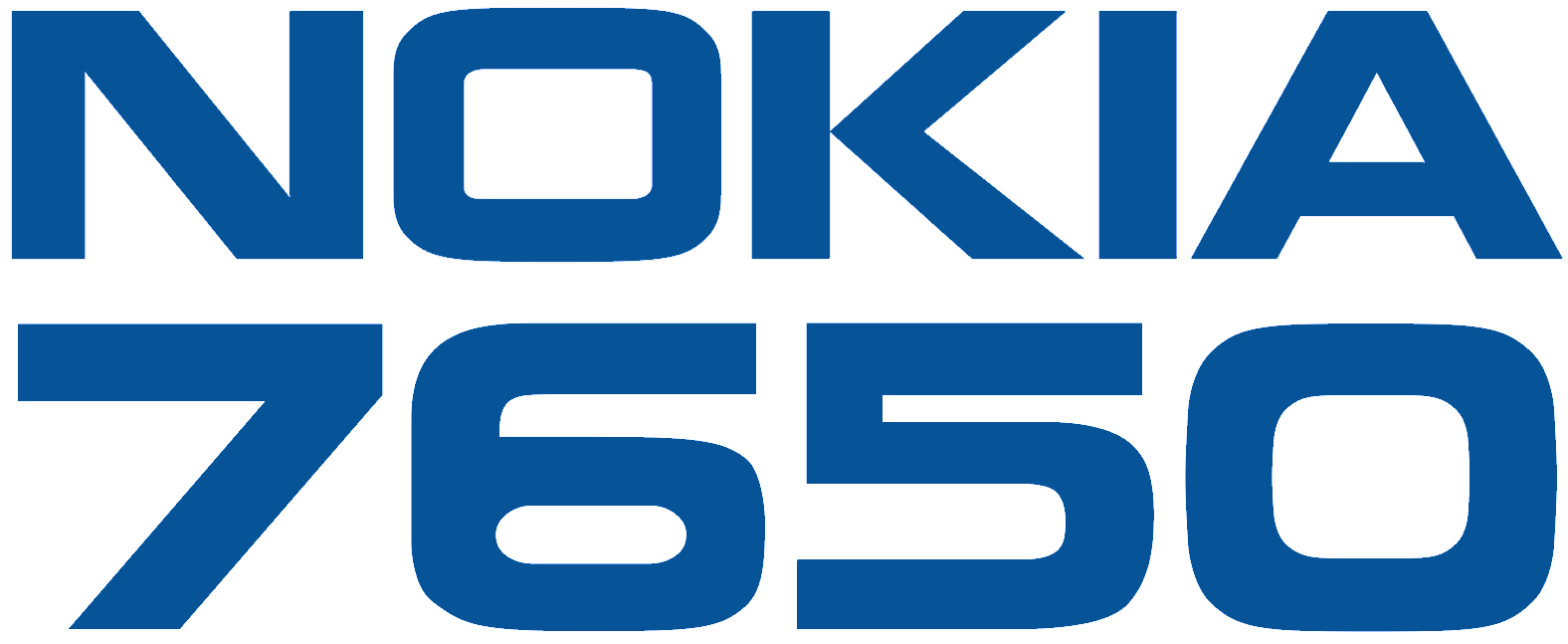

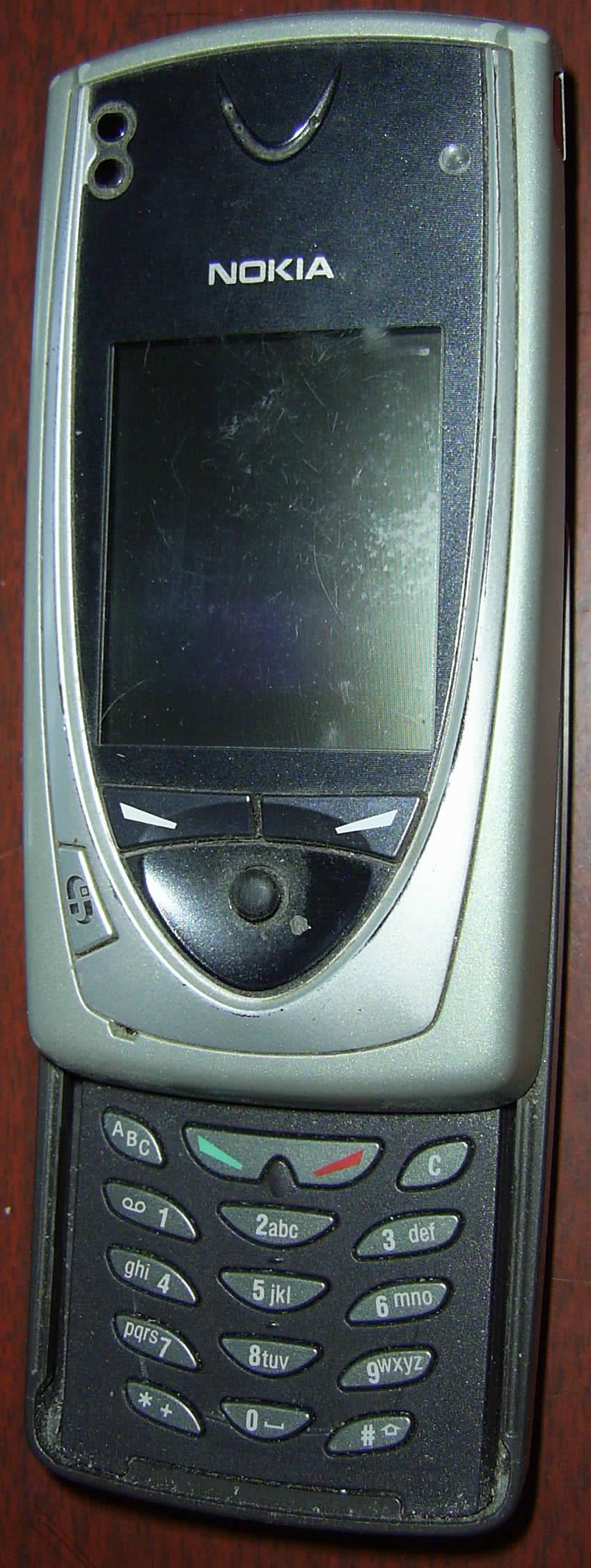
- Manufacturer: Nokia
- Availability by region: June 2002
- Discontinued: Q1 2006
- Predecessor: Nokia 7110
- Successor: Nokia 3650; Nokia 6600; Nokia N80
- Compatible networks: GSM 900/1800 MHz
- Form factor: Slider
- Dimensions: 114×56×26 mm (4.5×2.2×1.0 in)
- Weight: 154 g (5 oz)
- Operating system: Symbian OS 6.1, S60 1st Edition
- Memory: 4 MB, 3.4 MB available to user
- Battery: BLB-2, 750mAh Li-ion
- Rear camera: 0.3 Megapixels 640x480 VGA
- Display: 176 x 208 pixel 4096 colours
- Connectivity: IrDA Bluetooth

The Nokia 7650 is a consumer-oriented GSM mobile phone developed by Nokia, announced in 19 November 2001 and released in June 2002. Belonging to the fashion and experimental (7xxx) series, it was one of Nokia's first camera phones (Note: The first Nokia-branded camera phone was the Japan-only J-NM01, released in 2001; it was not an in-house development as it was made by Sanyo as an original design manufacturer.) as well as their first Series 60 platform device (which would go on to power the majority of Nokia smartphones for many years after), as well as the first mass market Symbian OS device to be released, allowing the sideloading of both Java and EPOC applications.

The 7650 was introduced in Barcelona on 19 November 2001, and was described by CEO Jorma Ollila as the company's most important launch of that year. Feature-rich, it was the first Nokia phone with a built-in camera (VGA resolution), and thus its imaging capabilities was widely marketed. It has a large (at the time) 2.1" colour display with a resolution of 176x208 pixels. The 7650 was also the company's first to feature Multimedia Messaging Service (MMS), and it also has Bluetooth and GPRS connectivities (although to much criticism did not support Bluetooth headsets). It was also the first Nokia phone with sliding keypad, the second being the Nokia 6111 released three years later.

These factors made the 7650 much-hyped at the time, especially as it came almost four years after the formation of Symbian Software Ltd. It was eventually released on 26 June 2002 for around €600 (about €980 in 2025, inflation-adjusted). The release was promoted in conjunction with the science fiction film Minority Report. Good sales of the 7650 helped Symbian OS to become the top product in the European "handheld devices market" in Q3 2002, above Palm OS and Windows CE. By this time its successor Nokia 3650 was introduced.

The 7650's significance for its time has been hailed in later years, with many considering it as being one of the most important mobile devices and one of Nokia's most iconic products.

== Technical specifications ==
The Nokia 7650 has a 32-bit RISC CPU, based on ARM-9 series, a 104 MHz CPU clock, 4 MB of non-expandable main memory (RAM) (3.6 MB available to the user) and 16 MB ROM.

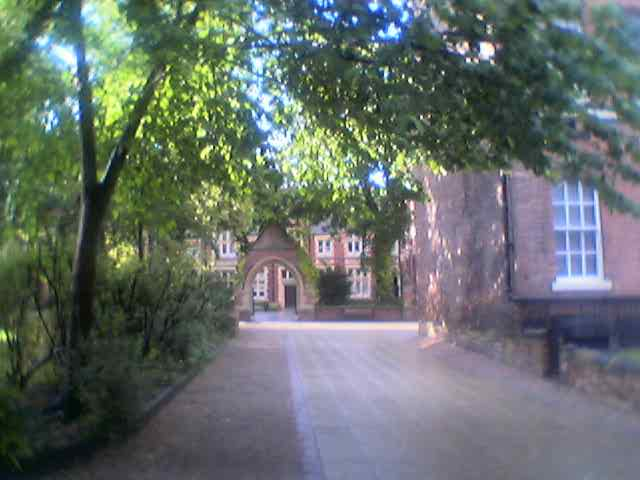
Picture taken with a Nokia 7650

=== Other features ===
- E-mail and MMS client
- Organizer and SyncML
- HSCSD and GPRS
- Java and EPOC application support
