= EllisLab =

American software development company

EllisLab, Corp.
- Company type: Private
- Industry: Software & Programming
- Founded: Los Angeles (2001)
- Headquarters: Santa Barbara, California
- Key people: Rick Ellis, Founder and CEO; Derek Jones, CTO/COO
- Products: ExpressionEngine; CodeIgniter pMachinePro; MojoMotor
- Revenue: Unknown
- Net income: unknown
- Website: http://ellislab.com/

EllisLab was a software development company based in Santa Barbara, California.

In November 2018, the company was acquired by Digital Locations. In October 2019 the company was sold back to its founder and CEO Rick Ellis, who then closed the company after 17 years in business. Their flagship software product ExpressionEngine CMS was sold to Packet Tide, LLC a software development company headquartered in New York.

== Products ==
Since the company's founding in January 2002, it has released four different applications to the public.

The first, pMachine Pro, is no longer developed, but was weblog software that had both a free and a licensed version. pMachine's feature list was similar to other weblog software of the time, such as Movable Type, Geeklog, and LiveJournal.

=== ExpressionEngine ===
ExpressionEngine is the company's flagship software product. It is a general purpose content management system written in object-oriented PHP and using MySQL for data storage.

ExpressionEngine is free and open-source software, licensed under Apache License, Version 2.0.

Sites built with ExpressionEngine use a number of custom channels, usually each containing a number of different fields. Channels typically represent different types of information, allowing a user to have a channel for single pages, blog posts, products, job vacancies, and other elements. Its flexibility and accessible templating language has made the system popular among web designers not skilled in server-side programming.

=== CodeIgniter ===
CodeIgniter is an open-source software web framework for building dynamic web sites with PHP, with particular emphasis on a small footprint. CodeIgniter is loosely based on the popular model–view–controller (MVC) development pattern.

EllisLab released the first public version of CodeIgniter on February 28, 2006. In October 2014, at the ExpressionEngine Conference in Virginia, EllisLab CEO Derek Jones announced that the company had transferred CodeIgniter to the British Columbia Institute of Technology. The new entity now maintains the PHP framework, which is no longer an EllisLab product.

=== MojoMotor (discontinued) ===
MojoMotor was a lightweight alternative to ExpressionEngine released in July 2010, developed by EllisLab. MojoMotor was made to create easy-to-edit, brochure-like sites that use almost entirely static pages. MojoMotor was retired in November 2015 and no longer receives updates or technical support.

== See also ==
- List of companies based in Oregon
- List of content management systems
