= Nokia 6680 =

Mobile phone

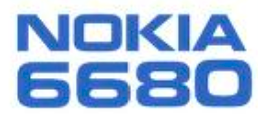

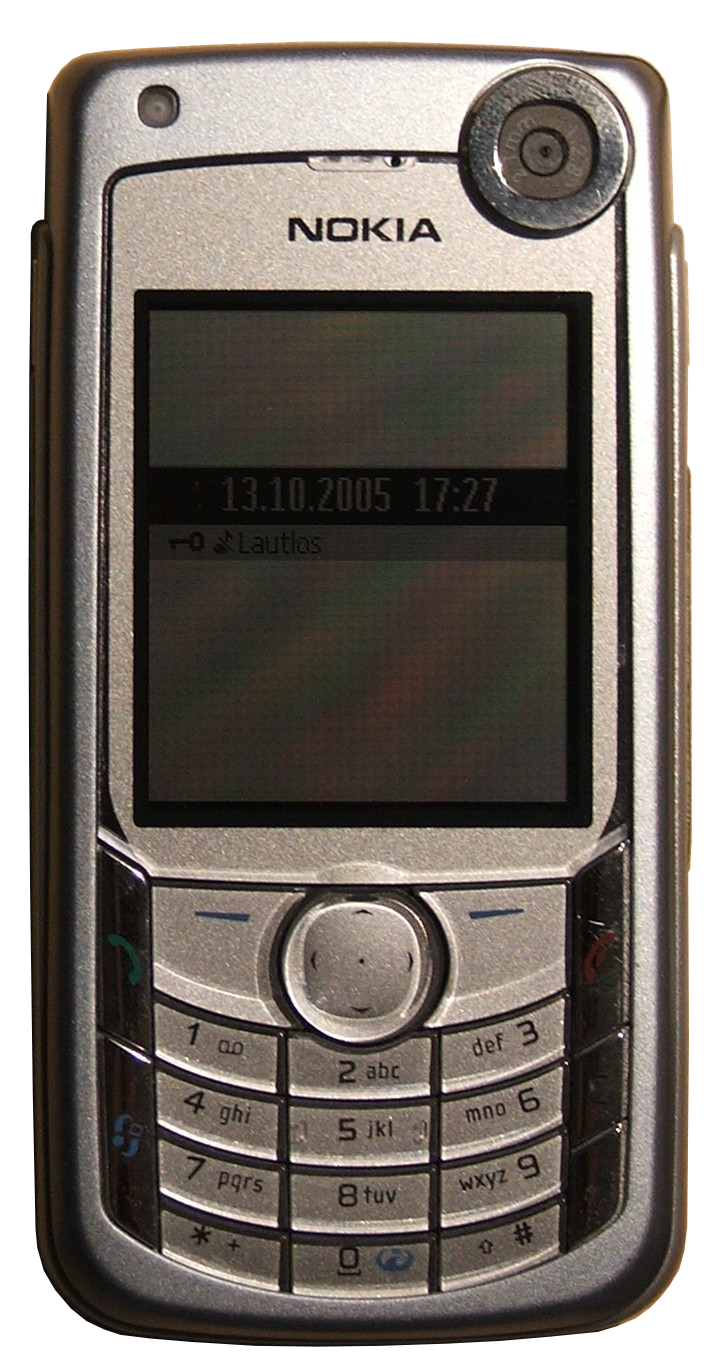
- Manufacturer: Nokia
- Availability by region: March 2005
- Predecessor: Nokia 6630 (6680); Nokia 6670 and 7610 (6681); Nokia 6620 (6682)
- Successor: Nokia N70 (6680); Nokia N72 (6681); Nokia N75 (6682)
- Related: Nokia 7610; Nokia 6670
- Compatible networks: 3G; 2G; GPRS
- Form factor: Candybar
- Dimensions: 108.4×55.2×20.5 mm (4.27×2.17×0.81 in); 104 cc
- Weight: 133 g (5 oz)
- Operating system: Symbian OS 8.0a (Series 60 2nd Edition, Feature Pack 2)
- CPU: 220 MHz TI OMAP 1710
- Memory: 20 MB (Accessible: 8 MB) SDRAM
- Storage: 32 MB (Accessible: 10 MB)
- Removable storage: Dual Voltage RS-MMC, hot swappable
- Battery: BL-5C
- Rear camera: 1.3-megapixel (back)
- Front camera: 0.3-megapixel (front)
- Display: Active matrix, 262,144-colour display (176 x 208 pixels)
- Connectivity: Bluetooth 1.2, USB 2.0 Full Speed via Pop-Port

The Nokia 6680 is a high-end 3G mobile phone running Symbian operating system, with Series 60 2nd Edition user interface. It was announced on 14 February 2005, and was released the next month. The 6680 was Nokia's first device with a front camera, and was specifically marketed for video calling. It was also Nokia's first device with a camera flash. It was the forerunner of the Nseries, which was released in April 2005; its successor being the N70.

== Features ==
The device features Bluetooth, a 1.3-megapixel fixed-focus camera, front VGA (0.3-megapixel) video call camera, hot swappable Dual Voltage Reduced Size MMC (DV-RS-MMC) memory expansion card support, stereo audio playback and a 2.1", 176x208, 18-bit (262,144) color display with automatic brightness control based on the environment.

The 6680 is marketed as a high-end 3G device. It is a smartphone offering office and personal management facilities, including Microsoft Office compatible software. The phone initially offered an innovative active standby mode, but this was removed by some network operators (for example, Orange) under their own adapted firmware. The phone, however, has been marred by a more-than-normal number of bugs, which have included crashes and security issues. The phone was also criticised in some reviews for the relatively limited amount of RAM, with Steve Litchfield of All About Symbian unfavourably comparing the 6680 to the otherwise similarly-equipped N70, which had significantly more RAM available for applications and games.

In addition to the standard RS-MMC card, the 6680 can also use Dual Voltage Reduced Size MMC (DV-RS-MMC) cards which are also marketed as MMCmobile. While these cards have the same form factor as RS-MMC, the DV-RS-MMC have a 2nd row of connectors on the bottom.

The phone operates on GSM 900/1800/1900, and UMTS 2100 on 3G networks.

During its development, the 6680 was codenamed Milla.

This handset was similar to its predecessor, the Nokia 6630. Key changes were the new "active standby" feature, the facility for face-to-face video calls, a camera flash, better screen and improved styling.

The hardware application platform of this device is OMAP 1710.

== Variants ==
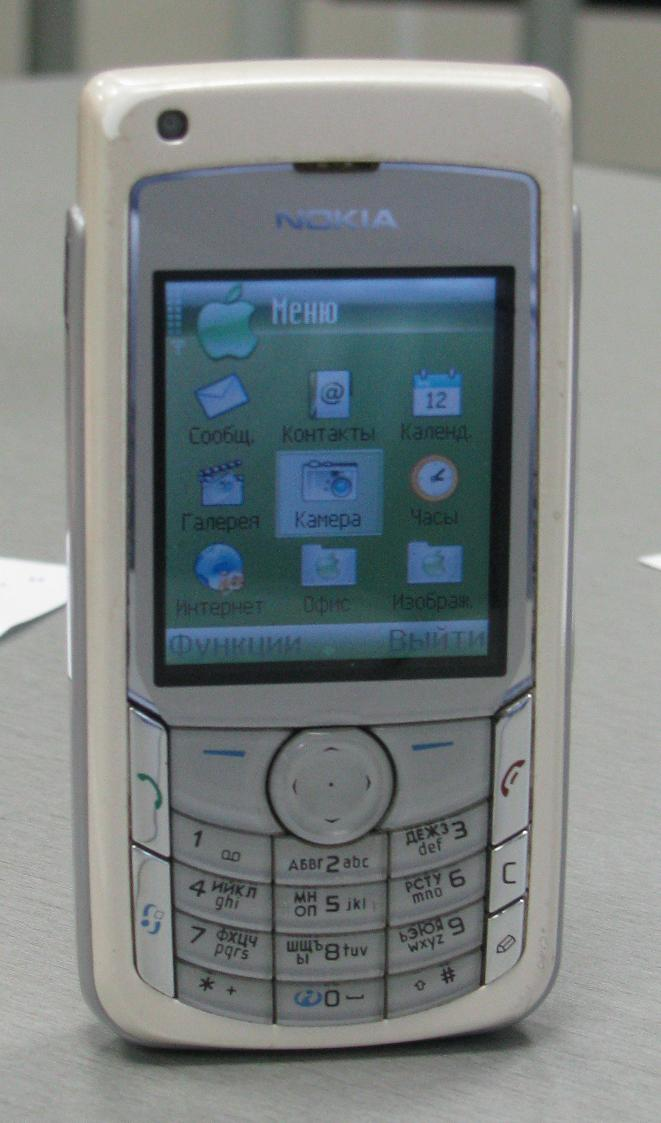
Nokia 6681/6682

The Nokia 6681 and Nokia 6682 are GSM handsets by Nokia, running the Series 60 user interface on the Symbian operating system. The phones are GSM-only versions of the Nokia 6680.

The only difference between the 6681 and the 6682 is the fact that the 6681 is targeted at the European market, being a GSM 900/1800/1900 tri-band handset, while the 6682 is sold for North American networks, supporting 850/1800/1900 frequencies.

In turn, both handset's specs are almost identical to those of the 6680, except for the lack of support for 3G networks, which means no UMTS support, or video call, thus the absence of the front video call camera.

== Related handsets ==
- Nokia N70
