= CodeIgniter =

Free and open-source software web development framework

- Original author: EllisLab
- Developers: British Columbia Institute of Technology (2014–2019), CodeIgniter Foundation (2019-now)
- Initial release: February 28, 2006
- Stable release: 4.6.4 / 2025-12-12;2 months ago
- Written in: PHP
- Operating system: Cross-platform
- Platform: PHP 5.6.0+ (v3.1.11) and PHP 8.1 or newer (v4.XX)
- Type: Web framework
- License: MIT License
- Website: codeigniter.com
- Repository: CodeIgniter 3.XX Repository; CodeIgniter 4.XX Repository

CodeIgniter is a free and open-source software rapid web development framework, for use in building dynamic web sites with PHP.

== Popularity ==
CodeIgniter is loosely based on the popular model–view–controller (MVC) development pattern. While controller classes are a necessary part of development under CodeIgniter, models and views are optional. CodeIgniter can be also modified to use Hierarchical Model View Controller (HMVC) which allows the developers to maintain modular grouping of Controller, Models and View arranged in a sub-directory format.

CodeIgniter is most often noted for its speed when compared to other PHP frameworks. In a critical take on PHP frameworks in general, PHP creator Rasmus Lerdorf spoke at frOSCon in August 2008, noting that he liked CodeIgniter "because it is faster, lighter and the least like a framework."

== Source code and license ==
CodeIgniter's source code is maintained at GitHub, and as of the preview version 3.0rc, is certified open source software licensed with the MIT License. Versions of CodeIgniter prior to 3.0.0 are licensed under a proprietary Apache/BSD-style open source license.

A 2011 decision to switch licensing to the Open Software License (OSL) sparked some community controversy, especially about the GPL incompatibility of the new license, to which EllisLab has responded with a series of articles entitled Software License Awareness Week.

== History ==
The first public version of CodeIgniter was released by EllisLab on February 28, 2006.

On July 9, 2013, EllisLab announced that it was seeking a new owner for CodeIgniter, citing a lack of resources to give the framework the attention they felt it deserved. On October 6, 2014, EllisLab announced that CodeIgniter would continue development under the stewardship of the British Columbia Institute of Technology. As of October 23, 2019, with the CodeIgniter Foundation taking the reins, CodeIgniter is no longer under the care of the British Columbia Institute of Technology.

CodeIgniter 4 was released On February 24, 2020, the birthday of Jim Parry, the project lead of CodeIgniter 4, and who died on January 15, 2020. Since then, the project has continued with another lead.

== See also ==
- Comparison of web frameworks
