= Nokia 6650 =

Mobile phone model

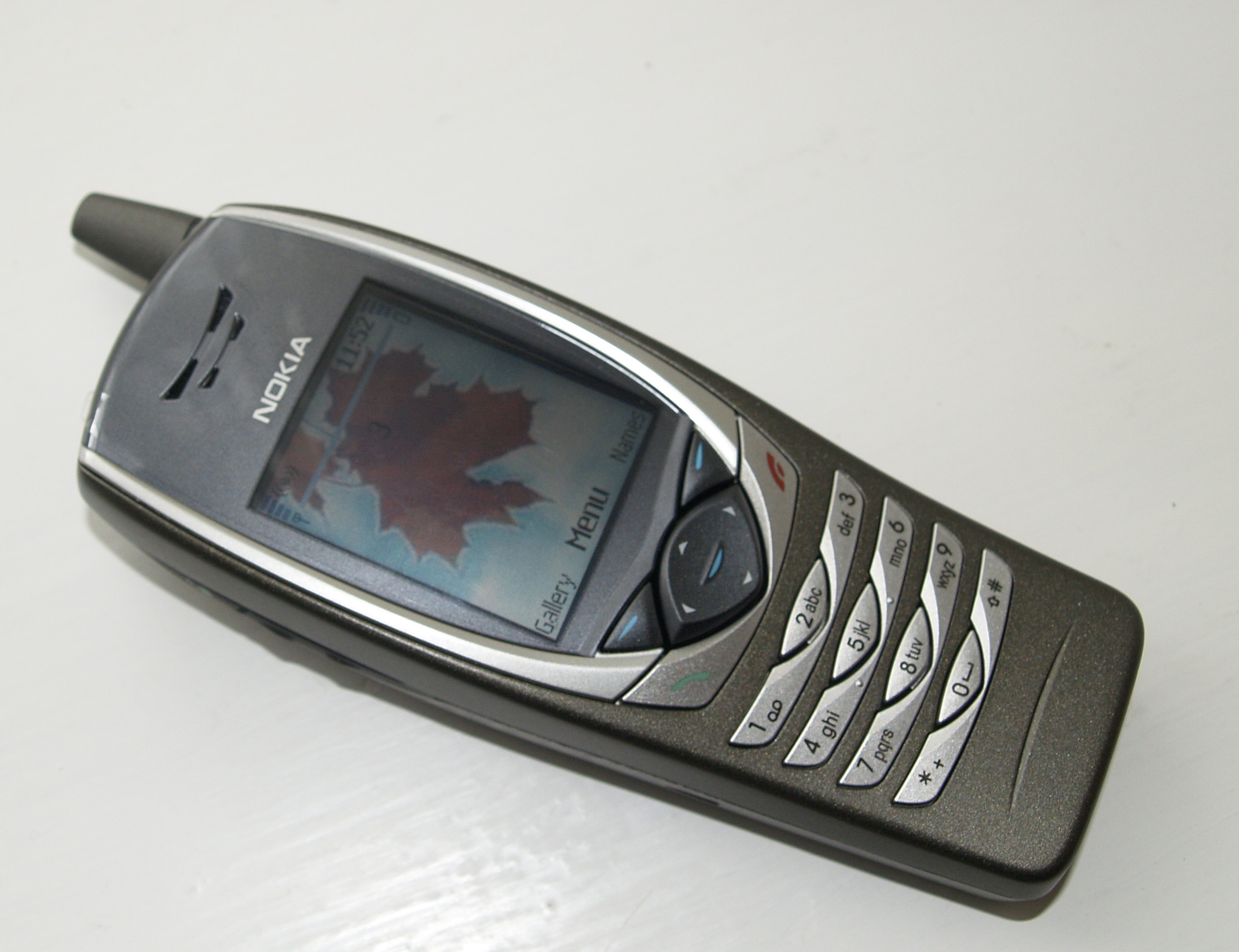
- Manufacturer: Nokia
- Type: Camera phone
- First released: June 2002
- Availability by region: September 26, 2002; 23 years ago
- Predecessor: Nokia 6340 (6650); Nokia 6340i (6651)
- Successor: Nokia N91 (6650); Nokia N91 8GB (6651)
- Related: Nokia 7600
- Compatible networks: GSM 900 and 1800 MHz; W-CDMA 2100 MHz
- Form factor: Candybar
- Dimensions: 132 mm (5.2 in) H 52 mm (2.0 in) W 25 mm (0.98 in) D
- Weight: 141 g (5.0 oz)
- Operating system: Series 40
- Memory: 7 MB internal
- Removable storage: None
- Battery: Removable 950 mAh Li-Ion
- Rear camera: VGA camera
- Display: TFT LCD (4096 colors, 128 x 160 pixels)
- Sound: Loudspeaker, vibration motor
- Connectivity: Bluetooth 1.1, Infrared
- Data inputs: Push buttons
- SAR: 0.64 W/kg

Nokia 6650 is a mobile phone developed by Nokia. It was the company's first 3G phone, first leaked in June 2002 and eventually unveiled on 26 September 2002. It was also the first device supporting the 3G W-CDMA 2100 MHz band.

== Versions ==
A 1900 MHz version known as the 6651 was released for the North American market soon after. Alongside the jointly-launched Motorola A845, the pair were the first UMTS 3G phones launched in America, on the short-lived AT&T Wireless UMTS network (the network later shut down, as part of the merger with Cingular Wireless - which eventually debuted its own 3G UMTS network). As a result, the Nokia 6651 was one of only two phones that ever launched on the AT&T Wireless 3G network.

== Appearance ==
Its appearance is very similar to that of Nokia 6100, but with a larger screen and external antenna (it was the last Nokia candybar phone with an external one). The 6650 uses the Nokia Series 40 platform, and is equipped with a VGA camera and supports Java ME applications. The device has 4096 colours and features Bluetooth, Infrared and a WAP browser.

== United Kingdom ==
The Nokia 6650 was used by UK mobile network operators to test their networks during the 3G roll-out. Despite this, the Nokia 6650 was never released to the general public in the UK.
