= Nokia 6600 =

Mobile phone model

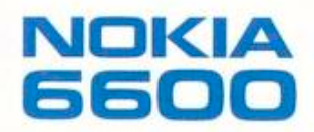

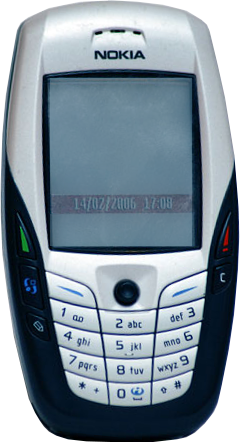
- Manufacturer: Nokia
- First released: June 16, 2003; 23 years ago
- Availability by region: NA: August 2003 EU: October 2003
- Discontinued: Q3 2008
- Predecessor: Nokia 6310i Nokia 7650
- Successor: Nokia 6630
- Related: Nokia 6620
- Compatible networks: GSM, GPRS, HSCSD
- Form factor: Bar
- Dimensions: 109×58×24 mm (4.29×2.28×0.94 in)
- Weight: 125 g (4 oz)
- Operating system: S60 2nd Edition on Symbian OS v7.0s
- CPU: 104 MHz
- Memory: 6 MB internal user storage
- Removable storage: MMC
- Battery: BL-5C, 3.7 V, 1020 mAh, Li-ion
- Rear camera: VGA 640x480, with 2x digital zoom
- Display: 176x208 (65,536 colours) 2.16" TFT display
- Connectivity: Bluetooth & IrDA

The Nokia 6600 is a mobile phone introduced on 16 June 2003 by Nokia, costing approximately €600 when released in October 2003. It was part of Nokia's high-end model of the 6xxx Classic Business Series. It runs on Symbian OS 7.0s (Series 60 2nd Edition). It also featured a VGA camera, a music player and video player, Bluetooth and a memory card slot, being the second non-Communicator to do so (after the Nokia 3650).

The model was used in many parts of the world and has proved to be a durable product. Many users consider it a trendsetter phone, which proved to be a bright milestone for its manufacturer. The phone was intended to replace the popular 6310i as the predominant business class model in the Nokia range. It should not be confused with the newer Nokia 6600 fold, Nokia 6600 slide and Nokia 6600i phones which have little resemblance to the original 6600. A variant of the Nokia 6600 was launched in the U.S. market as the Nokia 6620.

Nokia reported shipments of over 2 million by February 2004, about four months after launch.

== Features ==
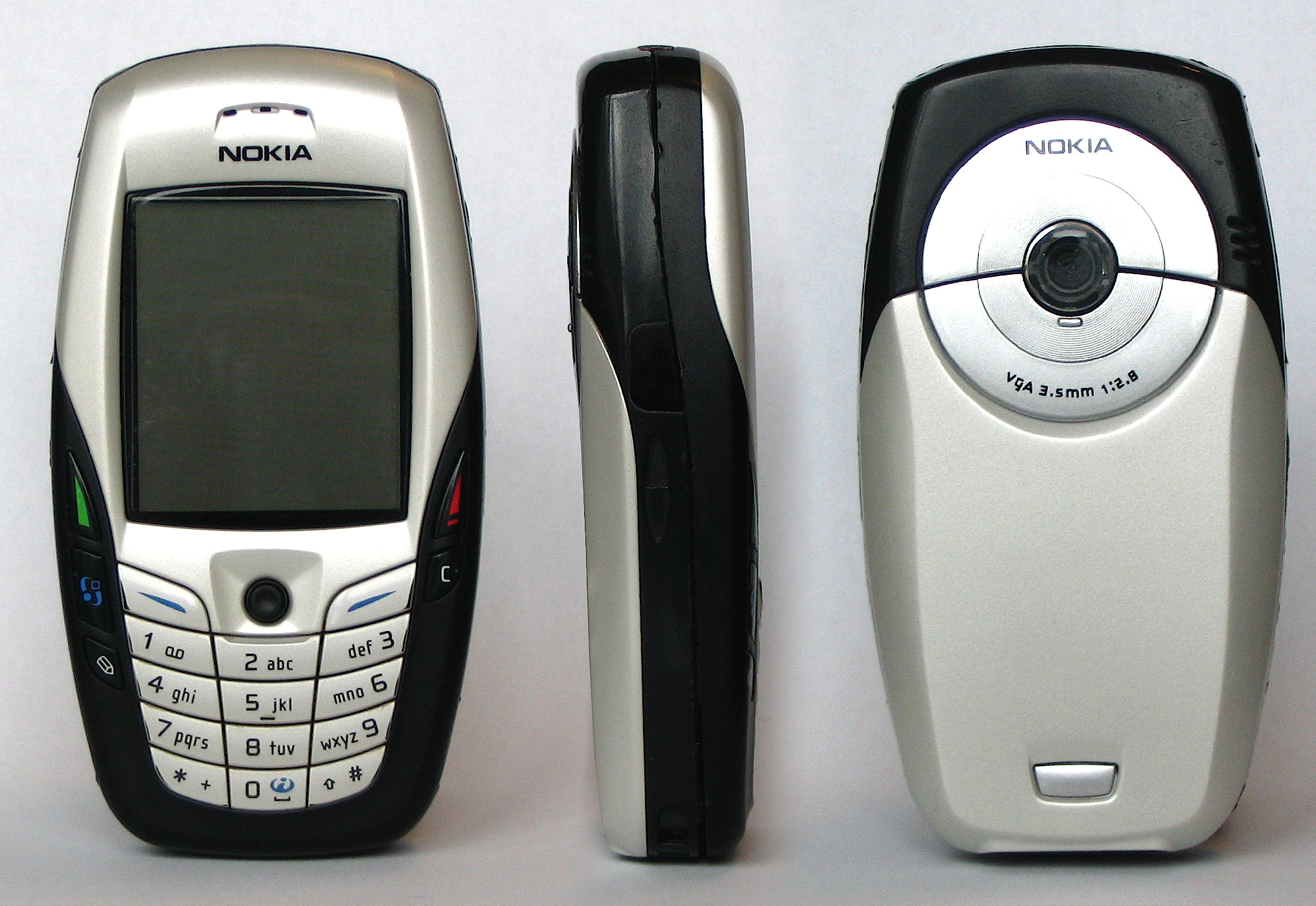
Nokia 6600 front, side and back

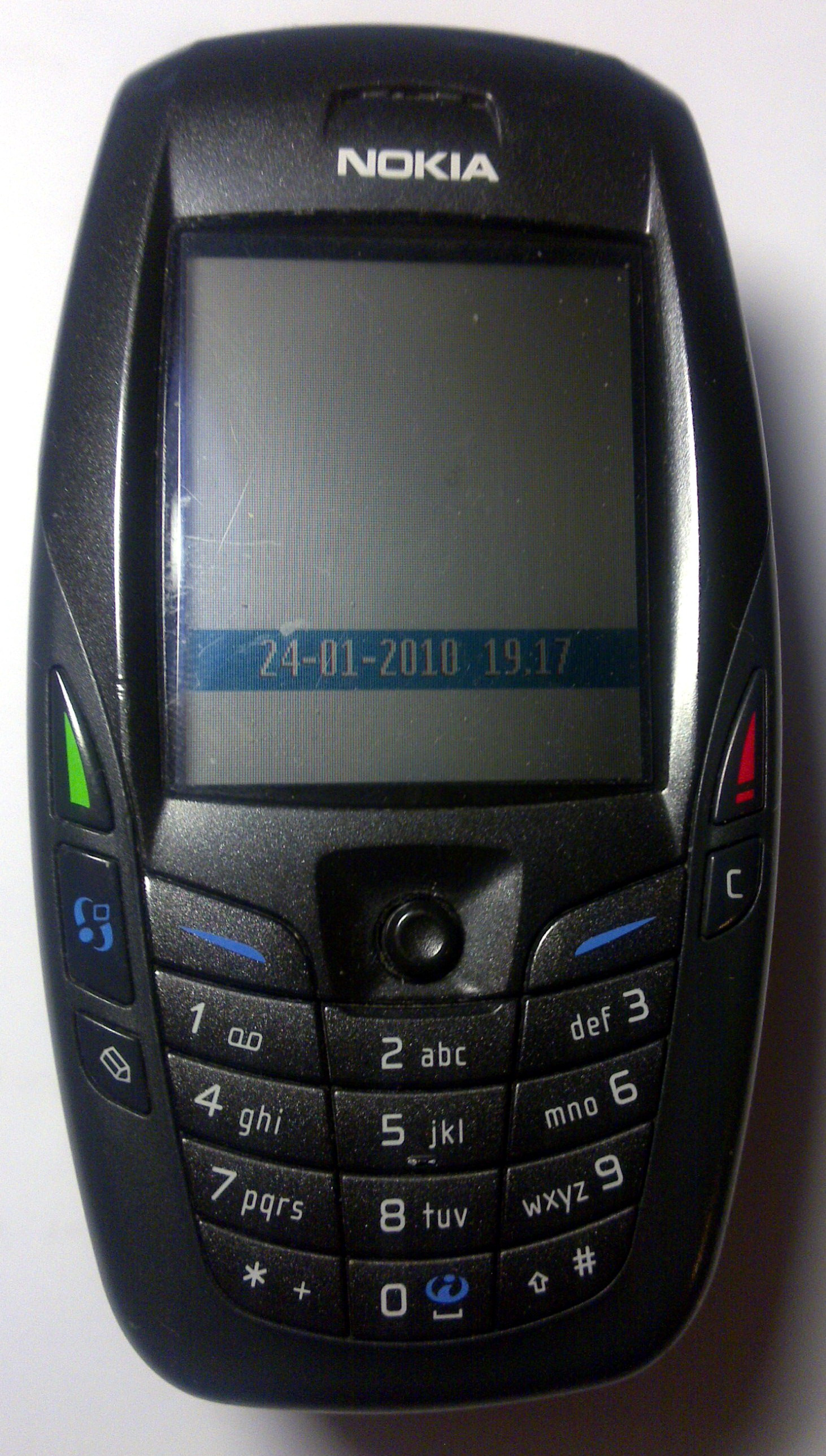
A black 6600

- Integrated (VGA 640x480) camera
- Video recorder with audio support (records up to 95 KB, from 9 to 27 seconds with built-in recorder application)
- Streaming video and audio
- Wireless connectivity with Bluetooth and IrDA
- 6 MB internal memory
- MMC card slot for additional user memory and applications
- Java MIDP 2.0 and Symbian (series 60) applications
- Data synchronization with PC via PC Suite and iSync
- Tri-band operation in GSM E900/1800/1900 networks

Additional features:

- A ARM compatible (ARM4T architecture) Processor
- Runs Symbian Operating System 7.0s
- The CPU runs at 104 MHz
- A 176x208 (65,536 colors) TFT display
- Has 5-way joystick navigation
- Has HSCSD and GPRS, for internet access

Although the initial batches of the Nokia 6600 were not stable, later system software upgrades corrected the situation.

The phone has the capacity to support the installation of a wide range of third-party software such as MP3 and multimedia players, games, web browsers, office suites, and GUI themes, via Java and ePoc (*.sis) installers. GUI themes can be created using the free Nokia Symbian Theme Studio.

The model was released to the general public in two color schemes: black and white and full black. Additional color schemes (blue and white, pink) were produced for promotional purposes.

In early 2008, Nokia stopped production of the 6600 handsets, prior to the release and availability of the N95.

== Related handsets ==
- Nokia 6620

== See also ==
- Cellular (2004 film) - The phone that Chris Evans uses during most of the movie is a Nokia 6600.
