= Nokia 7600 =

2003 cell phone model

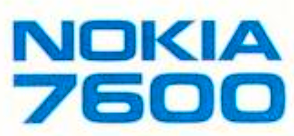

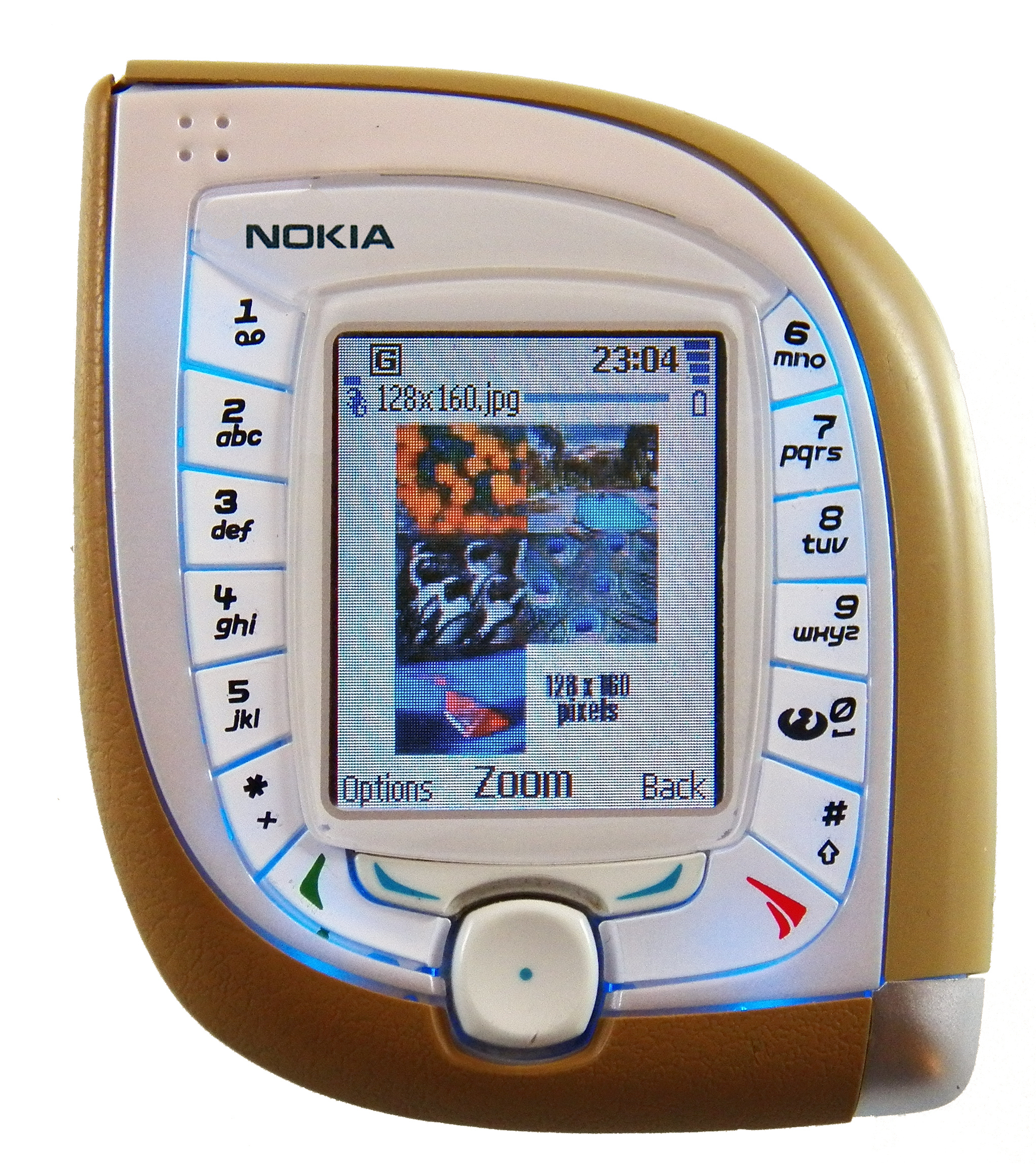
- Manufacturer: Nokia
- Availability by region: Q4 2003
- Predecessor: Nokia 3300b
- Related: Nokia 6650
- Form factor: Candybar
- Dimensions: 87×78×19 mm (3.43×3.07×0.75 in), 103 cc
- Weight: 123 g (4 oz)
- Operating system: Series 40
- Removable storage: No
- Battery: Nokia BL-5C; Li-Ion 850 mAh
- Rear camera: 0.3 megapixels
- Front camera: No
- Display: 128 x 160 pixels

The Nokia 7600 is a camera phone developed by Nokia, running on Series 40. The 7600 was announced on 25 September 2003 and was Nokia's second 3G handset after the Nokia 6650. It is notable for its unique radical design.

== Technical details ==
The phone weighs 124 g (4.4 oz) and measures 8.7 cm × 7.8 cm × 1.86 cm (3.43 in × 3.07 in × 0.73 in) and at launch was one of the smallest and lightest dual-band (900/1800) or (900/1900 in Asia) GSM 2-2.75G tiers with GPRS/EDGE and (2100) 3G tiers Support with UMTS/WCDMA phones mostly of country (including Japan and China) in the world. The 7600 has a 65,536 TFT colour screen and contains a 640 x 480 digicam for both photography and video.

== Design ==
The phone was primarily aimed at the "fashion" market, as it had a unique teardrop shape and a variety of interchangeable covers were available. During its development, the model was internally considered to be "top secret" due to its trendy nature. The number keys are located around the large screen. It includes a VGA camera.

It has polyphonic ringtone support. The built-in MP3/AAC audio player allows up to 29MB of songs to be transferred to the handset using Bluetooth, Infrared or a USB connection through its Pop-Port. Many of the preloaded ringtones and sounds were composed by former demoscene musician Markus Castrén, who worked at Nokia during mid-2002. For both the Nokia N-Gage and 7600, he wrote ringtones in a variety of popular dance genres to reflect the trendy nature of both models.

The 7600 has a talk time of nearly three hours using a 3G connection. Stand-by time is up to 12.5 days.

== Reception ==
The 7600 was seen by some as notoriously awkward to use. Texting or using the menu requires both hands, though this was helped by the large dimensions of the phone. It also suffered as a result of having lower specifications than similar phones of its generation. Today the phone is relatively valuable on the second hand market.
