= LifeType =

Blogging platform

- Developer: Project members
- Stable release: 1.2.11 / January 13, 2011
- Operating system: Cross-platform
- Type: CMS/Blog software
- License: GPL
- Website: www.lifetype.net
- Repository: devel.lifetype.net/svn/plog/plog/

LifeType is an open-source blogging platform with support for multiple blogs and users in a single installation. It is written in PHP and backed by a MySQL database. LifeType is licensed under the GNU General Public License.

With the integration of the template editor plug-in, users can make custom adjustments to LifeType's templates. As an open source project, LifeType is built, maintained and adjusted by the Lifetype community of designers.

== See also ==
- list of blogging terms
