= Nokia 6620 =

2004 mobile phone model

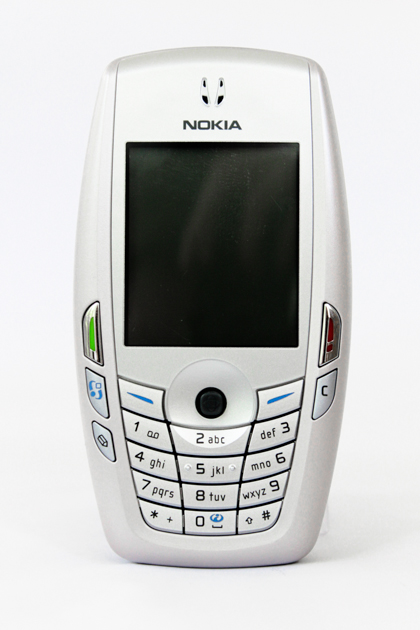
- Manufacturer: Nokia
- Availability by region: 2004
- Predecessor: Nokia 3620 (unofficial)
- Successor: Nokia 6682
- Related: Nokia 6600
- Compatible networks: (United States) GSM 850/1800/1900 MHz
- Form factor: Candybar
- Dimensions: 109×58×23.6 mm (4.29×2.28×0.93 in)
- Weight: 124 g (4 oz)
- Operating system: Series 60/Symbian OS
- Memory: 12 MB
- Removable storage: MMC (32 MB included)
- Battery: BL-5C, 3.7v, 850mAh Li-ion
- Rear camera: 0.3 Megapixels 640x480 VGA
- Display: 176 x 208 pixel 65,536 colors
- Connectivity: IrDA, Bluetooth, USB
- Development status: Available

The 6620 is a mobile phone created by Nokia, announced in 2004, running on Series 60 2nd Edition and the Symbian operating system. It was the first EDGE-capable phone for the Americas' market.

It is a version of Nokia's 6600 smartphone for the North American market, with all the features of the 6600 such as the VGA camera, MultiMediaCard slot, Bluetooth and color screen, but with a change to the North American GSM frequencies, newer version of Nokia Series 60 v2 with Feature Pack 1 (the original 6600 had common Series 60 v2 without Feature Packs), the doubling of internal RAM, the addition of Nokia's new Pop-Port connector, the inclusion of stereo sound, and a new EDGE capability, effectively giving it double the download speeds of contemporary General Packet Radio Service (GPRS)-equipped phones. Although not officially designed as a successor, it replaced the Nokia 3620 in the Cingular Wireless (now AT&T Mobility) lineup shortly after their acquisition of AT&T Wireless Services.

This phone usually came packaged with a charger, battery, 32-megabyte MMC card and USB cable.

== Features ==
- 65,000 color screen
- VGA camera for pictures and video
- GSM voice communication (850 MHz, 1800 MHz and 1900 MHz)
- GPRS and EDGE data communication
- Bluetooth, infrared and USB connectivity
- Support for SMS, MMS and email messages
- Multiple mailboxes for remote email downloads
- Web browsing for WAP and HTTP websites
- 12 megabytes internal memory
- MMC expansion slot supporting up to 2 gigabytes
- Hands-free speakerphone
- Multiple ringtones included with space for more
- Usual software including calendar, calculator, wallet, messaging, voice recorder, phone book, gallery, notes
- Symbian and Java support for applications and games
- Instant Messaging (IM) support
- RealPlayer included for audio and video playback
- Full MP3 support, including saved playlists
- Stereo audio playback using Nokia stereo headphones or Nokia AD-15 3.5mm stereo headphone adapter (the 6600 is mono-only)

== Digital downloads ==
The EDGE capability allows the 6620 to play streaming video, so that users may view video clips that are not stored on the phone itself. The phone also supports downloading smart messages from the network, if supported by the network operator, to update settings.

== Technical specifications ==
The main CPU in this phone is an ARM925t-compatible chip running at 150 MHz while the 6600 only runs at 104 MHz. The camera supports resolutions up to 640x480 and has a 2x digital zoom. It can record video for up to 10 minutes. The RealPlayer software can play back video and audio, and also files in MP3 and AVI format. The talk time is listed at 4 hours, with 200 hours of standby.

== See also ==
- Nokia 6600
- Nokia 6670
