= Siemens Mobile =

Defunct German mobile phone manufacturer

Siemens mobile
- Type: Division
- Industry: Telecommunications equipment
- Founded: 1985; 41 years ago
- Defunct: 31 August 2005
- Fate: Acquired by BenQ
- Successors: BenQ-Siemens; Gigaset
- Headquarters: Munich, Germany
- Area served: Worldwide
- Products: Mobile phones
- Parent: Siemens AG

Siemens Mobile was a German mobile phone manufacturer and a division of Siemens AG. Siemens sold Siemens Mobile to the Taiwan-based BenQ in 2005, subsequently becoming BenQ-Siemens and succeeded by Gigaset. The last Siemens-branded mobile phones, the AL21, A31 and AF51, were released in November 2005.

== History ==
The first Siemens mobile phone, the Siemens Mobiltelefon C1, was launched in 1985. In 1994 the Siemens S1 GSM phone was launched. In 1997 Siemens launched the first phone with a colour screen, the Siemens S10, with a screen capable of displaying red, green, blue and white. In the same year Siemens launched the first "outdoor" phone, the Siemens S10 Active, with enhanced shock, dust and splash protection. Siemens launched the first slider phone, the Siemens SL10, in 1999.

Siemens acquired the mobile phone division of Bosch in 2000. In the same year Siemens launched one of the first phones with an MP3 player and external memory card support (MultiMediaCard), the Siemens SL45.

In 2003 Siemens launched its first phone running on the Symbian OS operating system, the Siemens SX1. The phone featured hot swappable MultiMediaCard. In the same year Siemens launched the Xelibri range of fashion phones. In 2005 Siemens launched the first phone with real GPS support, the Siemens SXG75.

As of Q3 2000, Siemens had an 8.6% mobile handset market share, putting it behind Ericsson, Motorola and Nokia. For the calendar year 2003, Siemens was again fourth behind Samsung, Motorola and Nokia, with a figure of 8.5%. In 2004 it decreased to 7.2%. Siemens Mobile was making large losses and plummeting sales at this time. By the first quarter of 2005, market share was down to 5.6% as it fell behind competitors LG and Sony Ericsson. Their Xelibri range of phones, which was the company's answer to the fashionable handset trend at the time, became a costly failure.

On 7 June 2005, the Taiwanese company BenQ agreed to acquire the loss-making Siemens Mobile from Siemens, together with exclusive right to use the Siemens trademark on its mobile phones for 5 years. Before transferring the mobile phone subsidiary to BenQ, Siemens invested 250 million euros and wrote down assets amounting to 100 million euros. Siemens also acquired a 2.5% stake in BenQ for 50 million euros. BenQ subsequently released mobile phones under the BenQ-Siemens brand, from its German unit. In 2006 the German unit of BenQ filed for bankruptcy.

Siemens restarted the production of mobile phones under the Gigaset brand name.

== Products ==
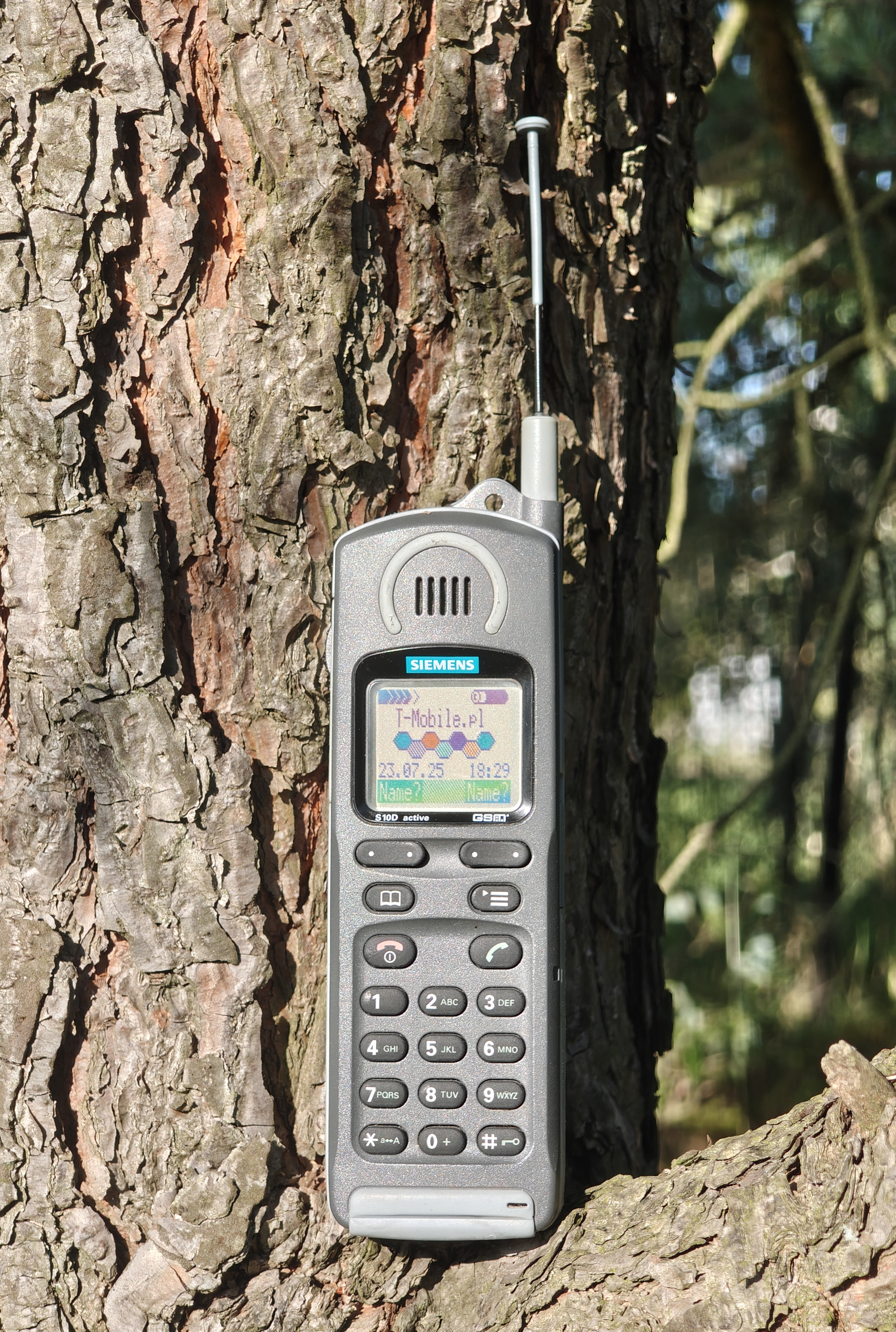
Siemens S10 D active, a rugged version of the S 10.

=== Classifications ===
Depending on their name, the Siemens mobiles have the following classifications:

- A series: low-cost phones with basic functionality.
- C series: mid-range phones.
- M series: phones with military specifications for outdoor activities.
- S series: flagship phones
- U series: UMTS devices manufactured in 2003 by Motorola Mobility, USA and rebranded under "Siemens" name.
- Secondary alphabet position initials
  - xF cradle phones
  - xL sliding phones (exceptions: Siemens SL45 and Siemens CL75)
  - xX phones with advanced features
  - xK phones with a full QWERTY keyboard (Siemens SK65)

Within a class, the numbers have the following meaning:

- the first digit (1-9) denotes the level of functionality of the phone;
- the second digit indicates the generation of the phone. The phones are also of the first generation of the model, containing the numbers 1, 6, 8.

=== List of products ===
- Siemens A31
- Siemens A35
- Siemens A36
- Siemens A40
- Siemens A50: one of the most popular Siemens phones, Shares same hardware as C45 and can be upgraded to C45 by firmware flash.
- Siemens A51
- Siemens A52: monochrome, GSM 900 / GSM 1800, no GPRS, no USB, IrDA or Bluetooth. Same as A55/A56
- Siemens A53
- Siemens A55: monochrome, GSM 900 / GSM 1800, no GPRS, no USB, no IrDA or Bluetooth. Shares same hardware as C55 and can be upgraded to C55 by firmware flash.
- Siemens A56: monochrome, GSM 850 / GSM 1900, no GPRS, no USB, no IrDA or Bluetooth. Shares same hardware as C56 and can be upgraded to C56 by firmware flash.
- Siemens A56i
- Siemens A57
- Siemens A60
- Siemens A62
- Siemens A65: CSTN 101x80 display, Triband (900 / 1800 / 1900)
- Siemens A70, last Siemens with monochrome display, Triband (900 / 1800 / 1900), completely unrelated to the A55/C55.
- Siemens A75
- Siemens AF51
- Siemens AP75 (Developed by BenQ, same with BenQ M580)
- Siemens AL21/AL21 Hello Kitty (TFT 130x130 display, GSM 900 / 1800 / 1900, no camera (same as CF110))
- Siemens AX72
- Siemens AX75 (taking pictures supported when connected with the QuickPic IQP-500 external accessories camera module like S55, S57, CF62 etc.)
- Siemens C1
- Siemens C2
- Siemens C3
- Siemens C4
- Siemens C5
- Siemens C10
- Siemens C11
- Siemens C25
- Siemens C28
- Siemens C30
- Siemens C35
- Siemens C35i
- Siemens C45
- Siemens C55: monochrome, GSM 900 / GSM 1800, with GPRS, no USB, no IrDA or Bluetooth. One of the most popular Siemens phones
- Siemens C56: monochrome, GSM 850 / GSM 1900, with GPRS, no USB, no IrDA or Bluetooth.
- Siemens C60
- Siemens C61
- Siemens C62 (Co-developed with Sony Ericsson sameness platform with T600, T610i)
- Siemens C65
- Siemens C66
- Siemens C70: Identical hardware to C65
- Siemens C71
- Siemens C72
- Siemens C75
- Siemens CC75 (cancelled)
- Siemens CF62
- Siemens CF65
- Siemens CF75 (CF65 based)
- Siemens CF110: TFT 130x130 display, GSM 900 / 1800 / 1900, no camera
- Siemens CFX65 (the first Siemens clamshells form factor with built in VGA camera and flash. CFX65 is the only model of Siemens that had a torch, you close the flip and double press volume the up key to start the torch.)
- Siemens CL50 (Developed By Arista)
- Siemens CL55 (Developed By LG Electronics )
- Siemens CL75, CL75 Black Edition, CL75 Poppy Edition
- Siemens CX65: TFT 132x176 display, GSM 900 / 1800 / 1900, VGA (640 x 480 pixel) camera, IRDA (Based on M65)
- Siemens CX66 (minor changes for some countries)
- Siemens CX70: TFT 132x176 display, GSM 900 / 1800 / 1900, VGA (640 x 480 pixel) camera, IRDA (Identical hardware to CX65)
- Siemens CX70 Emoty (in the CX70 family's)
- Siemens CXV70 (in the CX70 family's for Vodafone)
- Siemens CXT70 (in the CX70 family's for T-Mobile)
- Siemens CXO70 (in the CX70 family's for O2)
- Siemens CX75
- Siemens E10
- Siemens M30: one of the most popular Siemens phones
- Siemens M35
- Siemens M35i: one of the most popular Siemens phones
- Siemens M45
- Siemens M50
- Siemens M55 Scorpions
- Siemens M56: GSM 850 / GSM 1900 version of M55. Note that it is not triband.
- Siemens M65
- Siemens M65 Rescue Edition
- Siemens M75
- Siemens MC60
- Siemens ME45
- Siemens ME75 (C75 Based)
- Siemens MT50
- Siemens P1
- Siemens S1
- Siemens S3
- Siemens S3 COM 1995
- Siemens S4
- Siemens S6
- Siemens S10 (World's First phone with colour display)
- Siemens S11 (Variant of S10 with GSM 1800 frequency while S10 was GSM 900 but it is also the world's first phone with colour display)
- Siemens S15
- Siemens S25
- Siemens S35i
- Siemens S40
- Siemens S42
- Siemens S45
- Siemens S45i
- Siemens S46
- Siemens S55 (Fully wireless connections with Bluetooth 1.1 and IrDA port)
- Siemens S55 Formula One
- Siemens S56
- Siemens S57 (Only IrDA port supportable)
- Siemens S65
- Siemens S65 DVBH, SXX65 (Concept phone) run on LINUX
- Siemens S66 (Minor-changes for some countries), S66 or S65 (for Xingular)
- Siemens S68 (rebranding and selling in BenQ-Siemens S68, the SP65 successors)
- Siemens S75 ( FE75 Internal pre-models)
- Siemens SF65 (co-development with Philips N.V. (France), the same models with Philips 760 twists)
- Siemens SFG75 (Developed by BenQ, same with BenQ S80 UMTS)
- Siemens SG75 (cancelled, in the same family with SXG75)
- Siemens SK65, SK6B and SK6R (Co-development with The RIM BlackBerry and run parallels between "Siemens_X65 platform" and "BlackBerry 3.8 OS". Select BB Icons on Main Menu then press "Option"-> "About" for the BBOS version pre installed info.)
- Siemens SK65 Burlwood Editions
- Siemens SP65 (S65 without Camera)
- Siemens SL10: the world firstly sliding mobile phone with a four-colour screen (Red, Green, Blue and White)
- Siemens SL42
- Siemens SL45: the worlds first phone with an MP3 Player
- Siemens SL45i
- Siemens SL55
- Siemens SL56: the American version of the Siemens SL55, available only on AT&T.
- Siemens SL65: TFT 130x130 display, GSM 900 / 1800 / 1900, VGA (640 x 480 pixel) camera, IRDA, slider form factor
- Siemens SL65 ESCADA Edition
- Siemens SL75/ SL7C
- Siemens SL80 (re-branding and selling in BenQ-Siemens SL80 Hello Kitty Edition)
- Siemens SLV140 (re-branding and selling in BenQ-Siemens EF81)
- Siemens ST55 (ODM Developed By Arista)
- Siemens ST60 (For T-Mobile)
- Siemens SX1, first and only smartphone developed and produced by Siemens AG, run on Symbian OS
- Siemens SX2 (cancelled) run on Symbian OS
- Siemens SX45 (Developed by hTC, run on Windows Mobile 2003 Edition)
- Siemens SX56 (Developed by hTC, run on Windows Mobile 5.0 Edition)
- Siemens SX66 (Developed by hTC, run on Windows Mobile 5.0 Edition can upgradable to WM 6.0 Edition)
- Siemens SXG75 (The first Siemens with BrewOS by Qualcomm and build internal GPS real-time functions.)
- Siemens SXX75 (Concept phone, Full touchscreen-slides platform. runs on BrewOS by Qualcomm)
- Siemens U10 (UMTS)(The first Siemens UMTS (3G) model's run on Moto Linux platform A and it was developed by Motorola Mobility.)
- Siemens U15 (The second Siemens UMTS (3G) model's run on Moto Linux platform A, and it was developed by Motorola Mobility.)
- Xelibri X1
- Xelibri X2
- Xelibri X3
- Xelibri X4
- Xelibri X5
- Xelibri X6
- Xelibri X7
- Xelibri X8

== Gallery ==
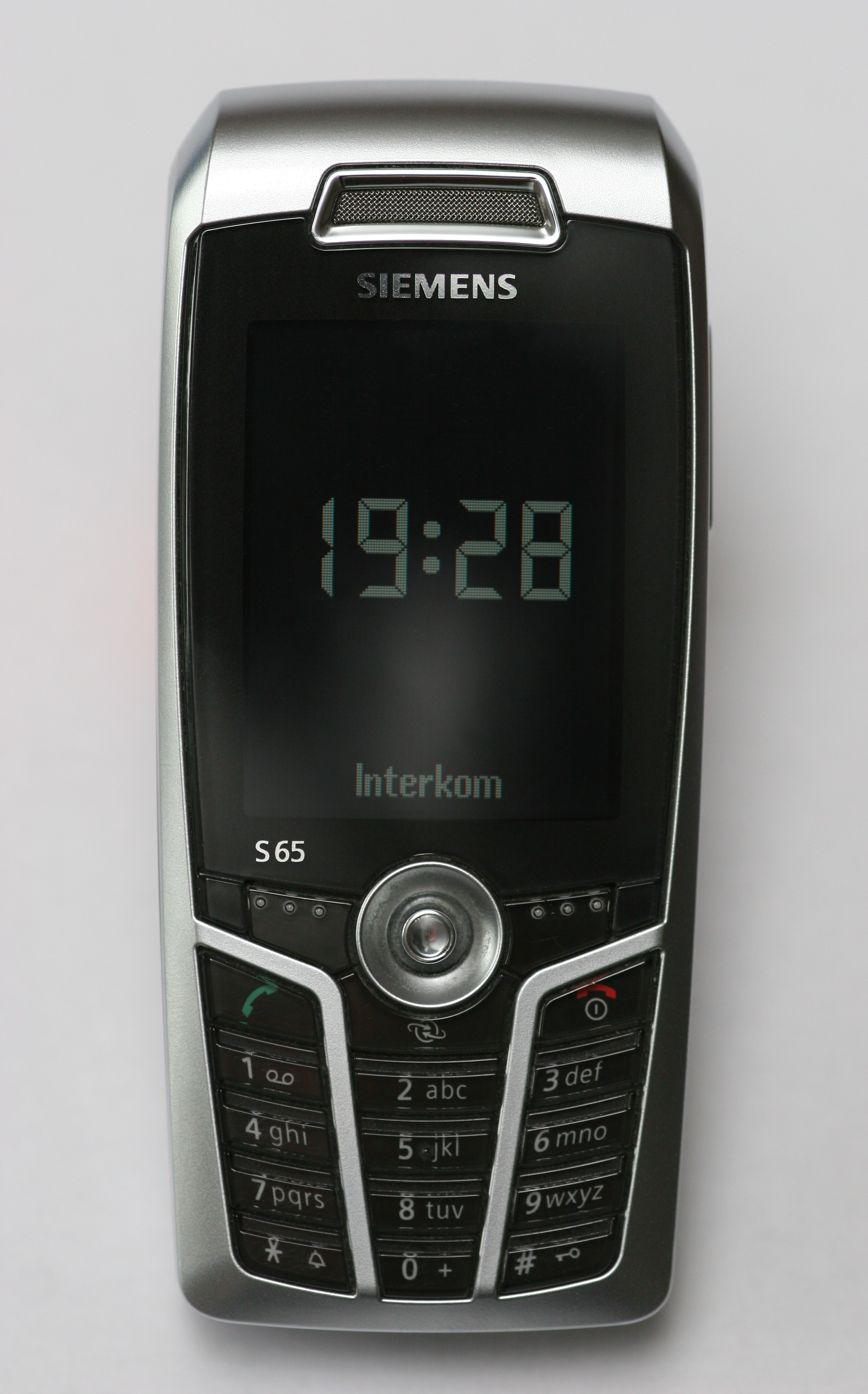
The Siemens S65

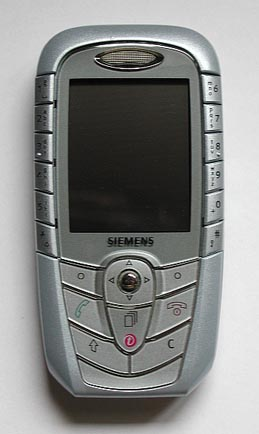
The Siemens SX1

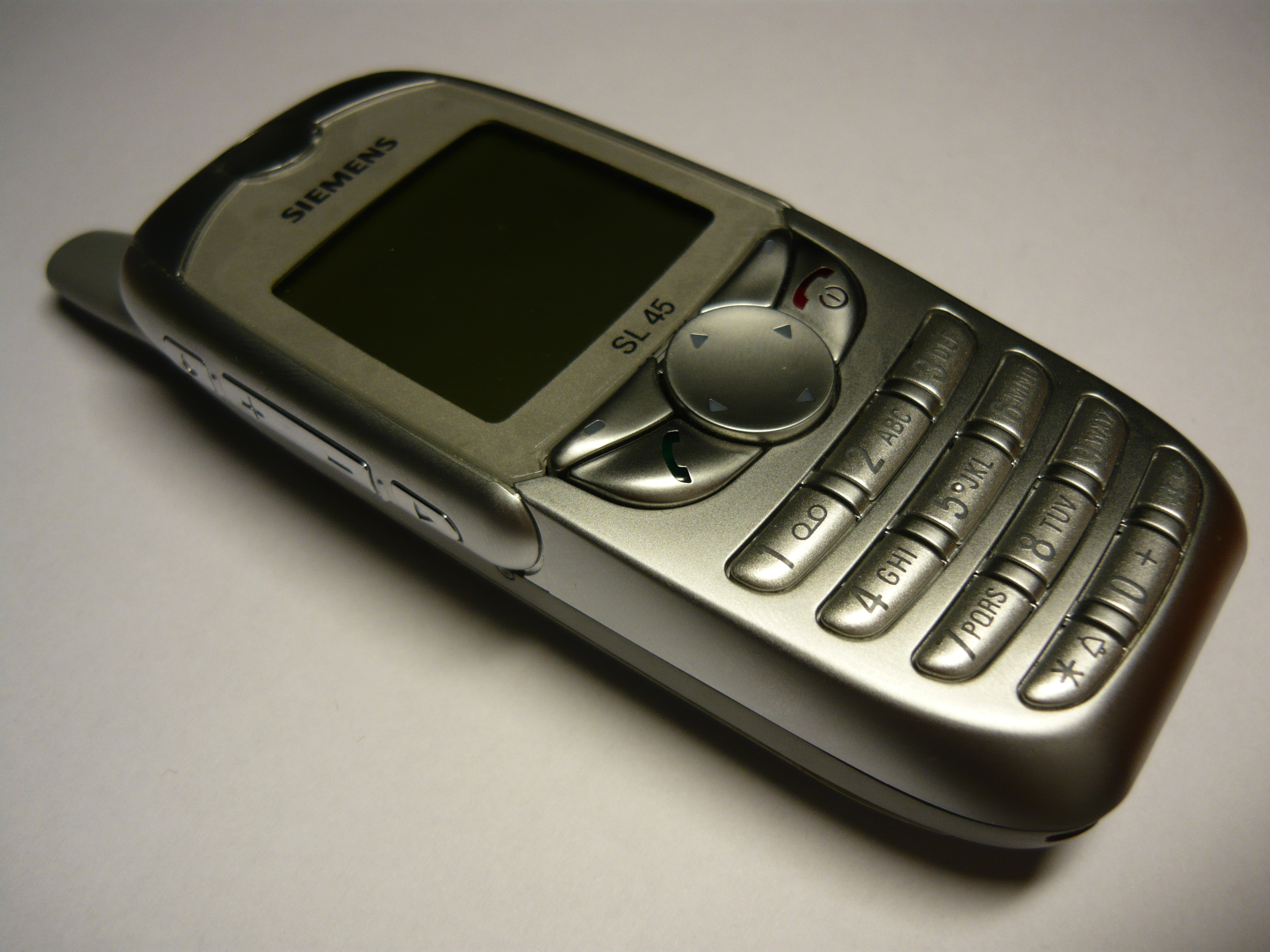
The Siemens SL45

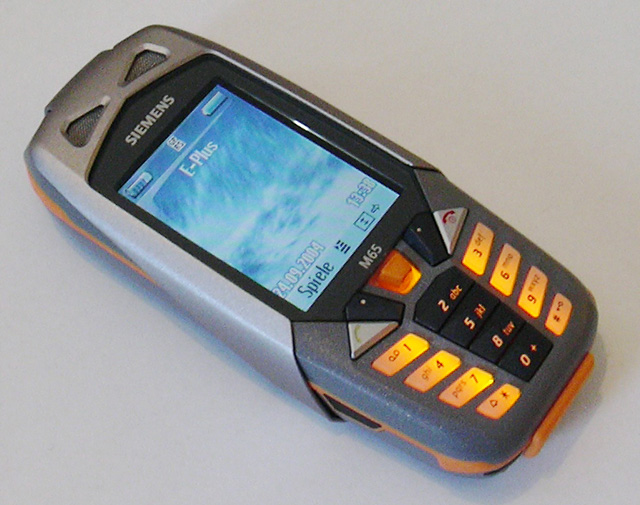
The Siemens M65

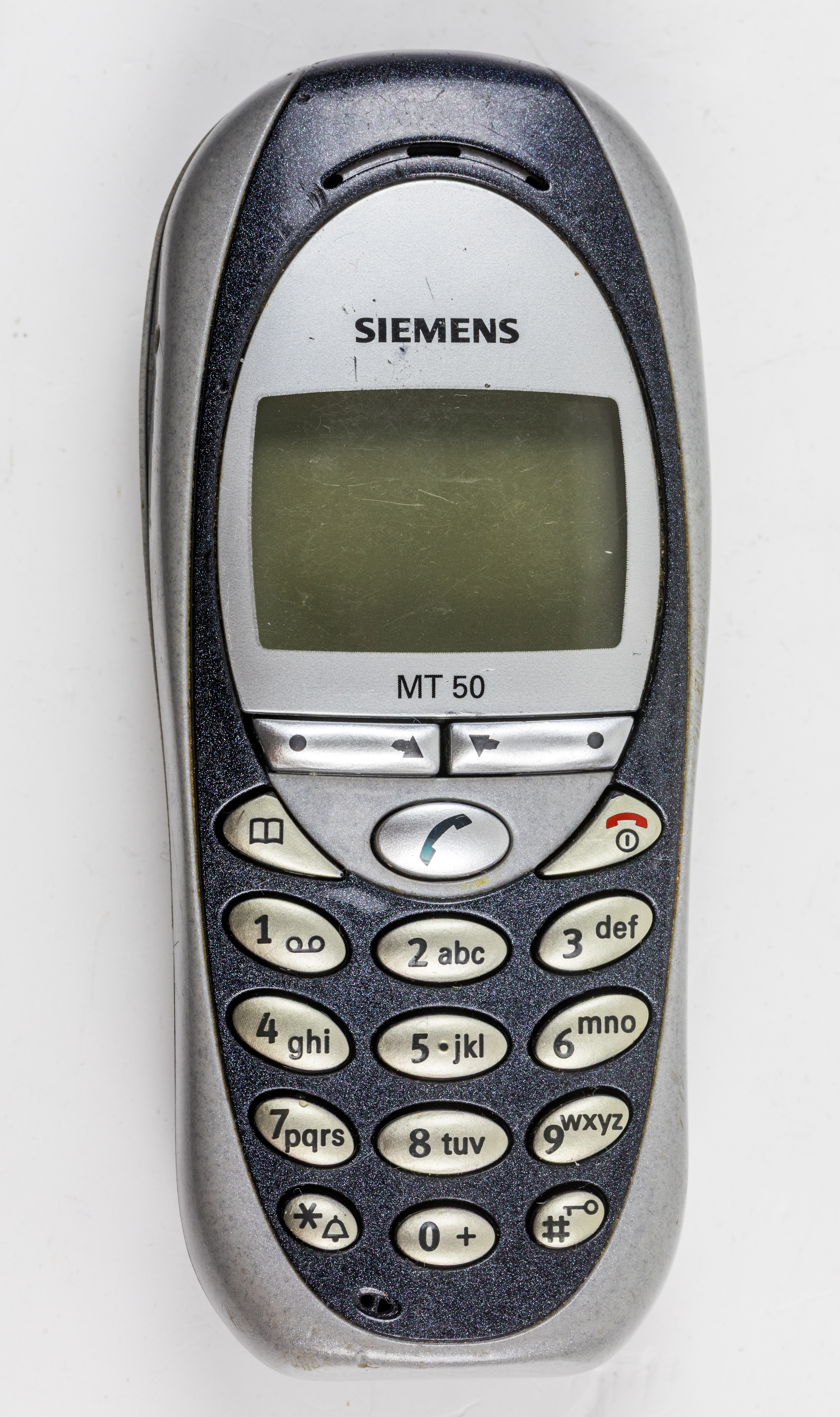
The Siemens MT50

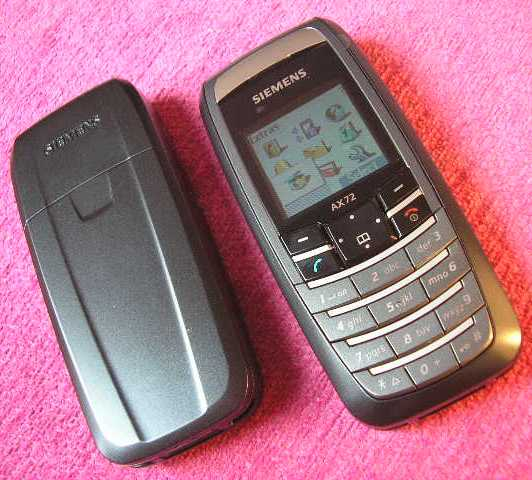
The Siemens AX72

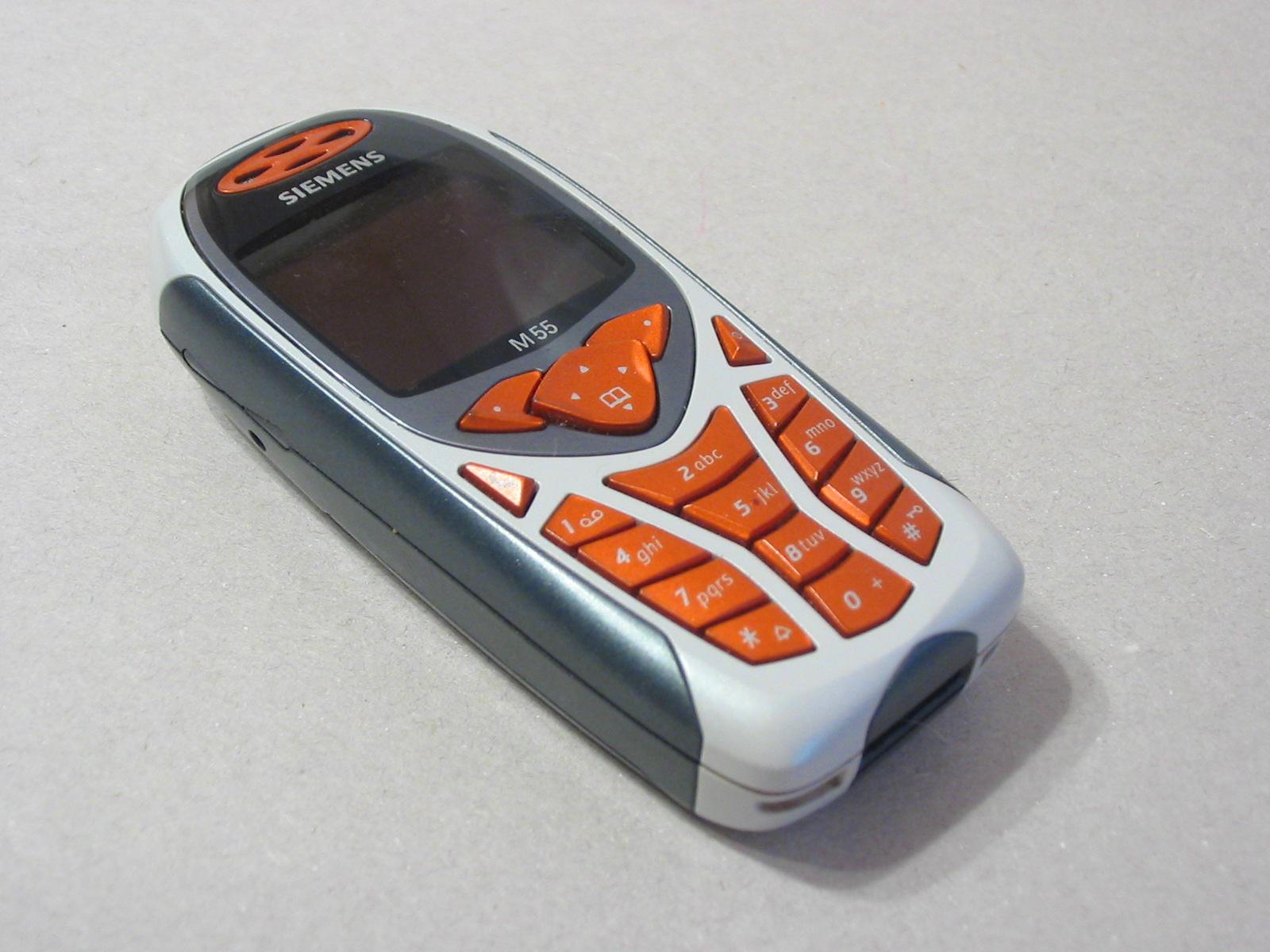
The Siemens M55

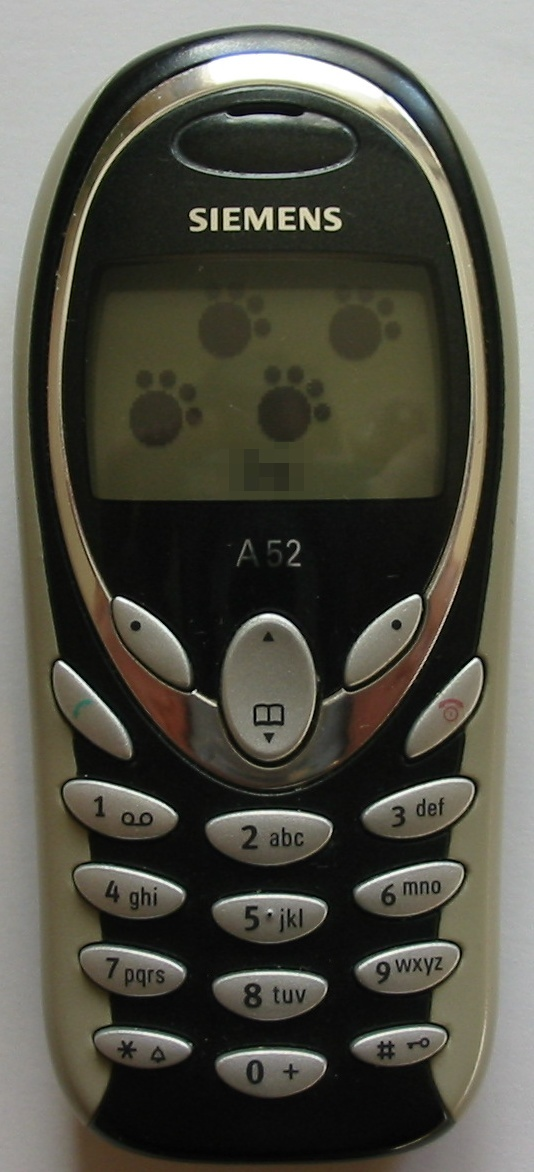
The Siemens A52

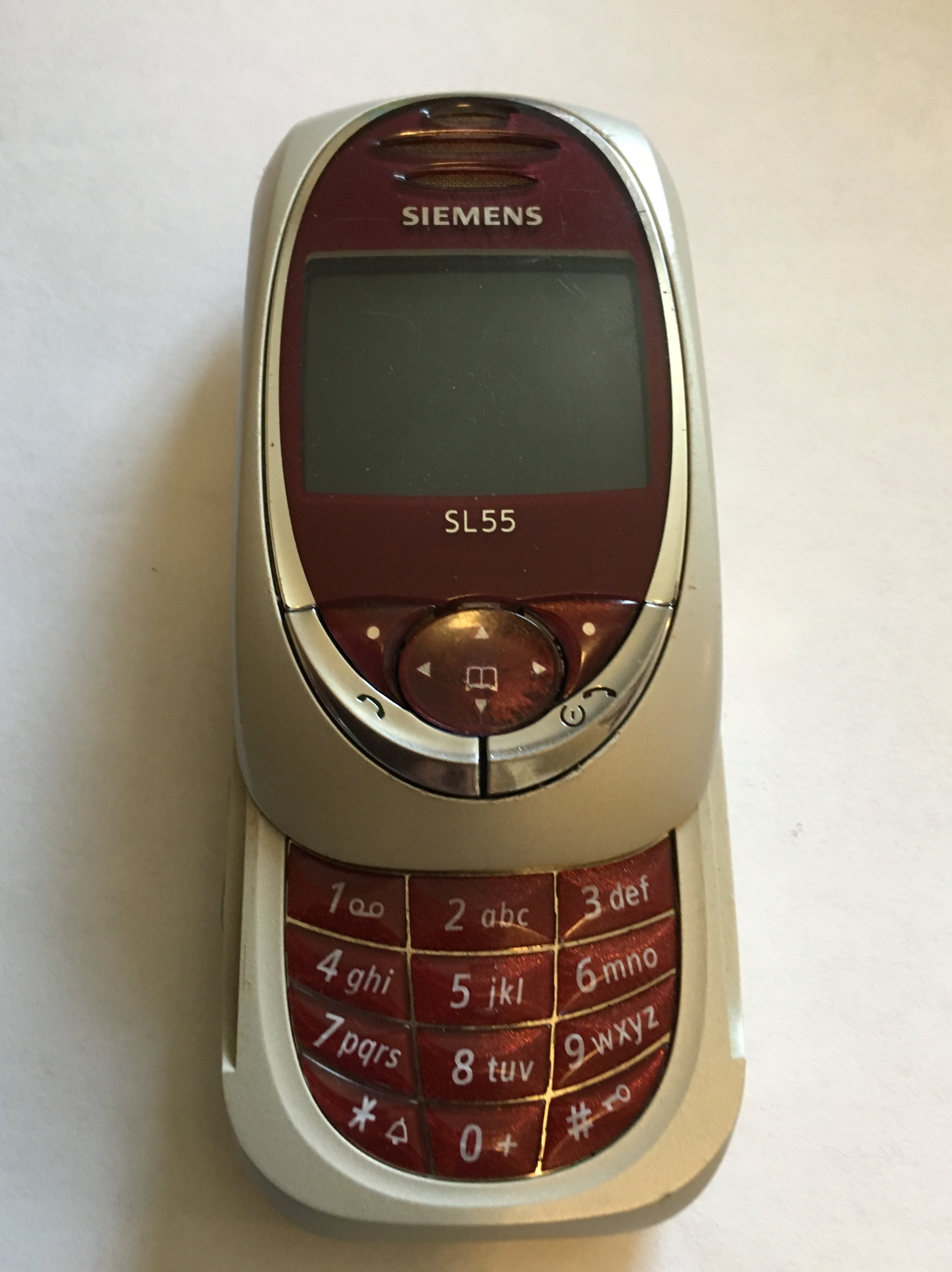
The Siemens SL55

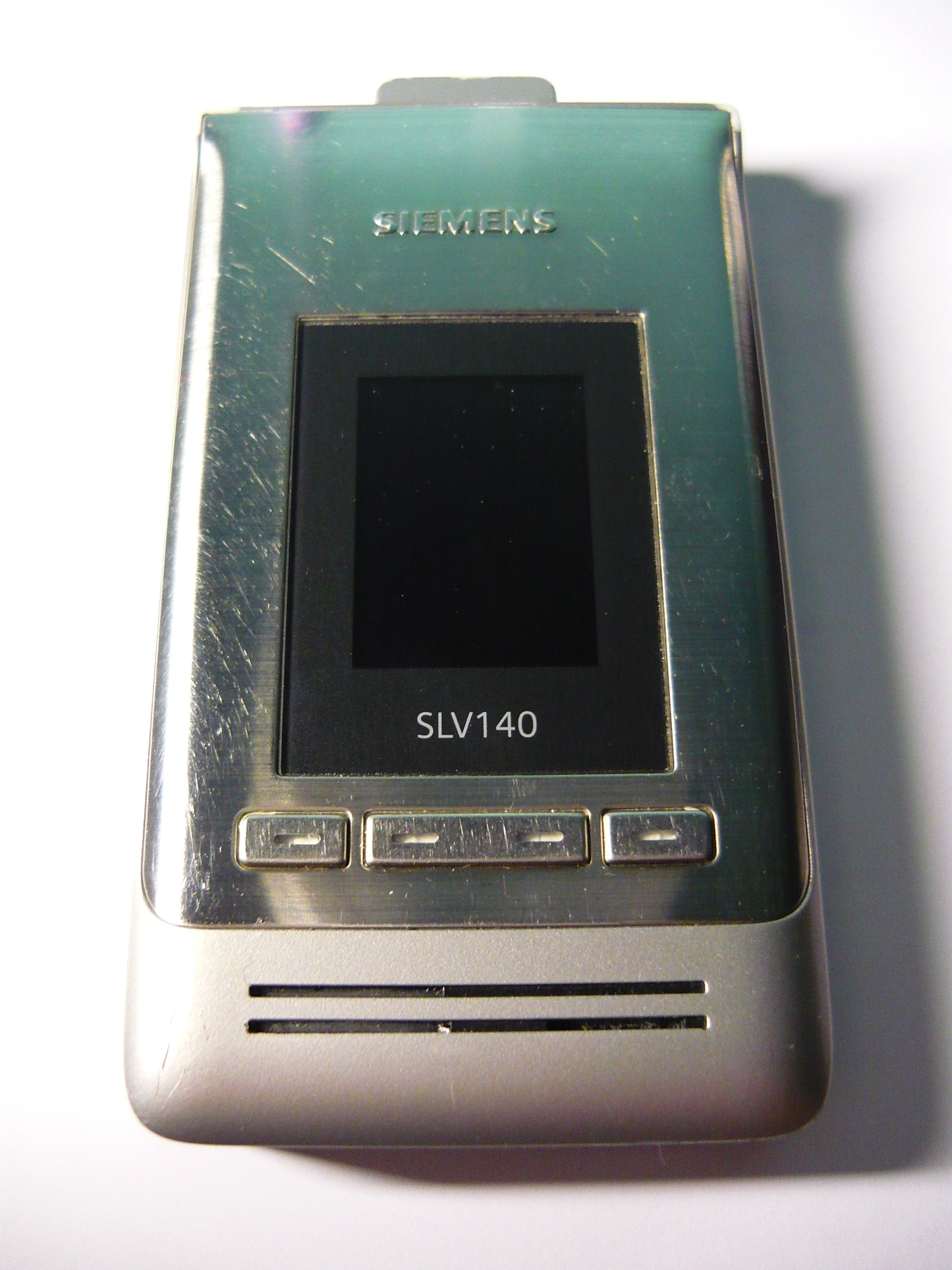
Siemens SLV140 (Rebranding and selling in BenQ-Siemens EF81)

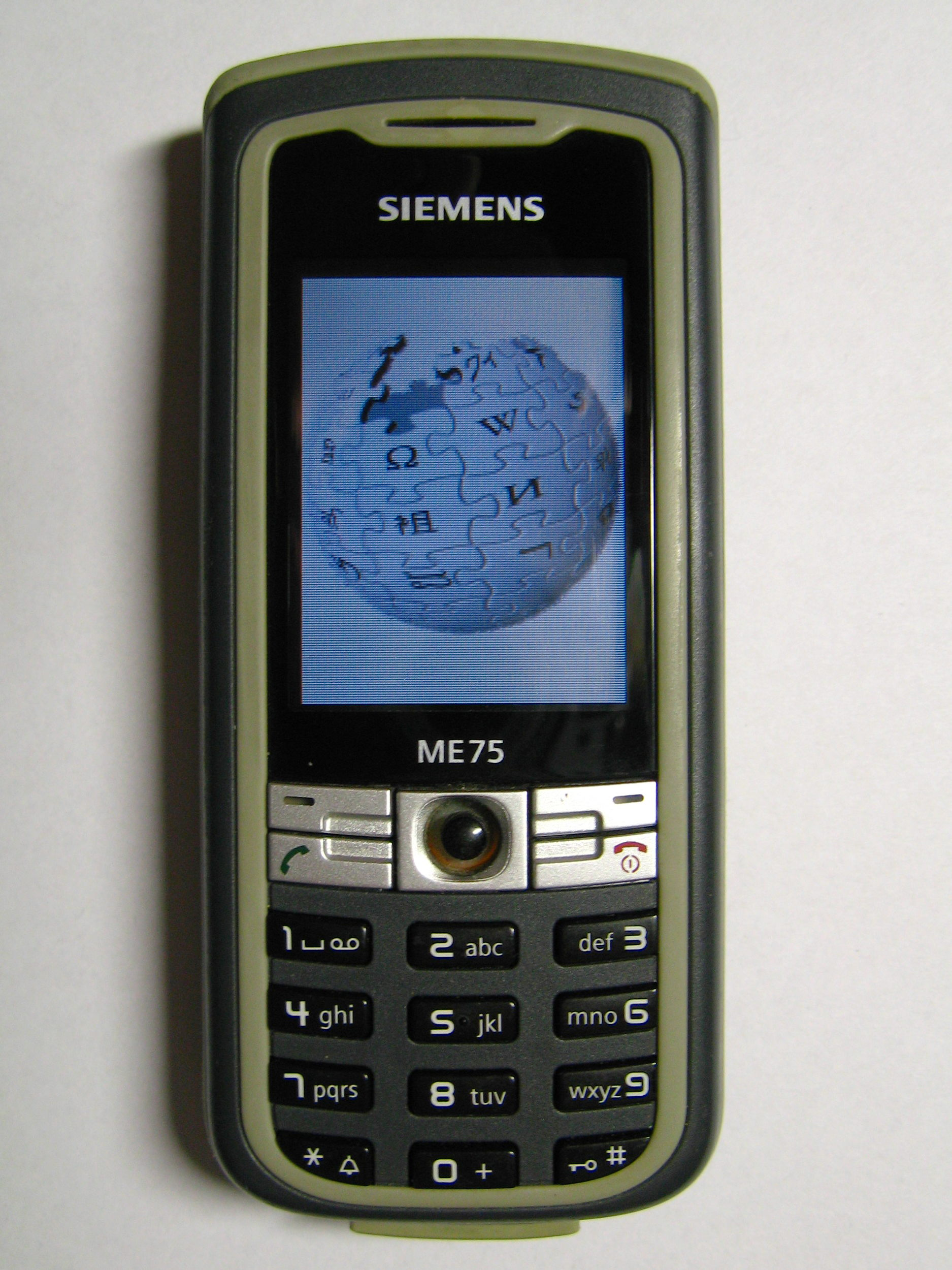
Siemens ME75 (based on Siemens C75)

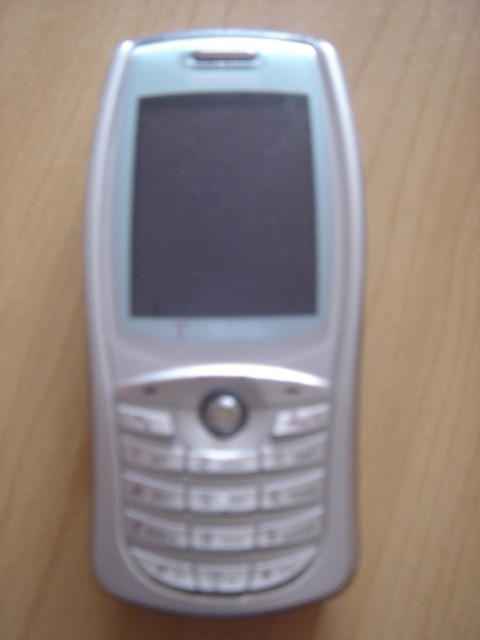
Siemens ST55/60 (ODM by Arista)

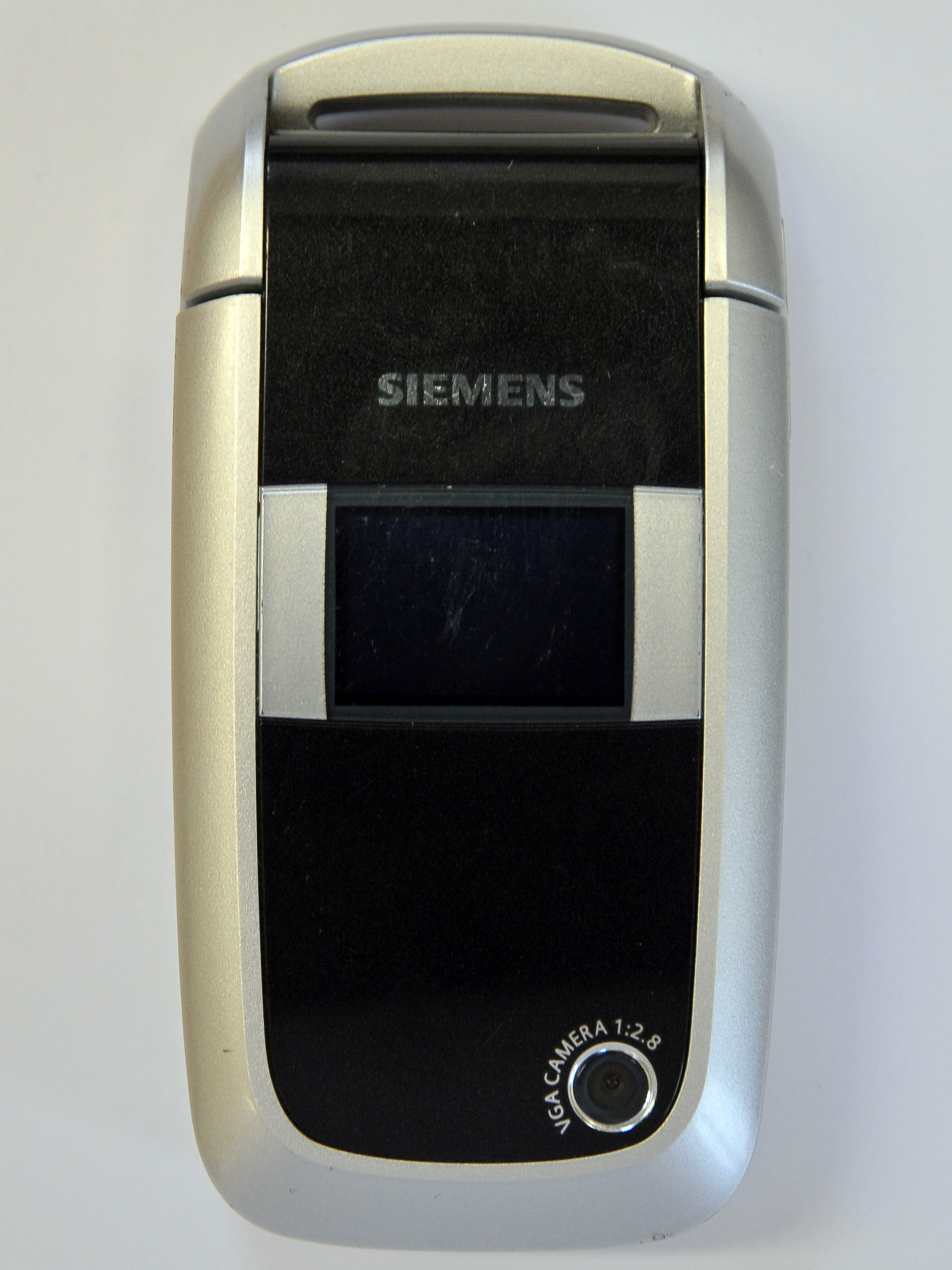
Siemens CF75

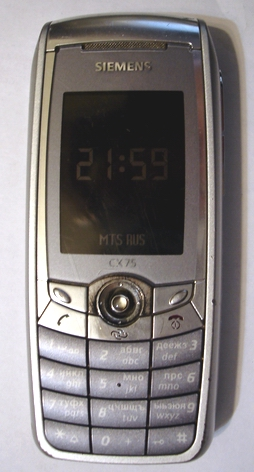
Siemens CX75

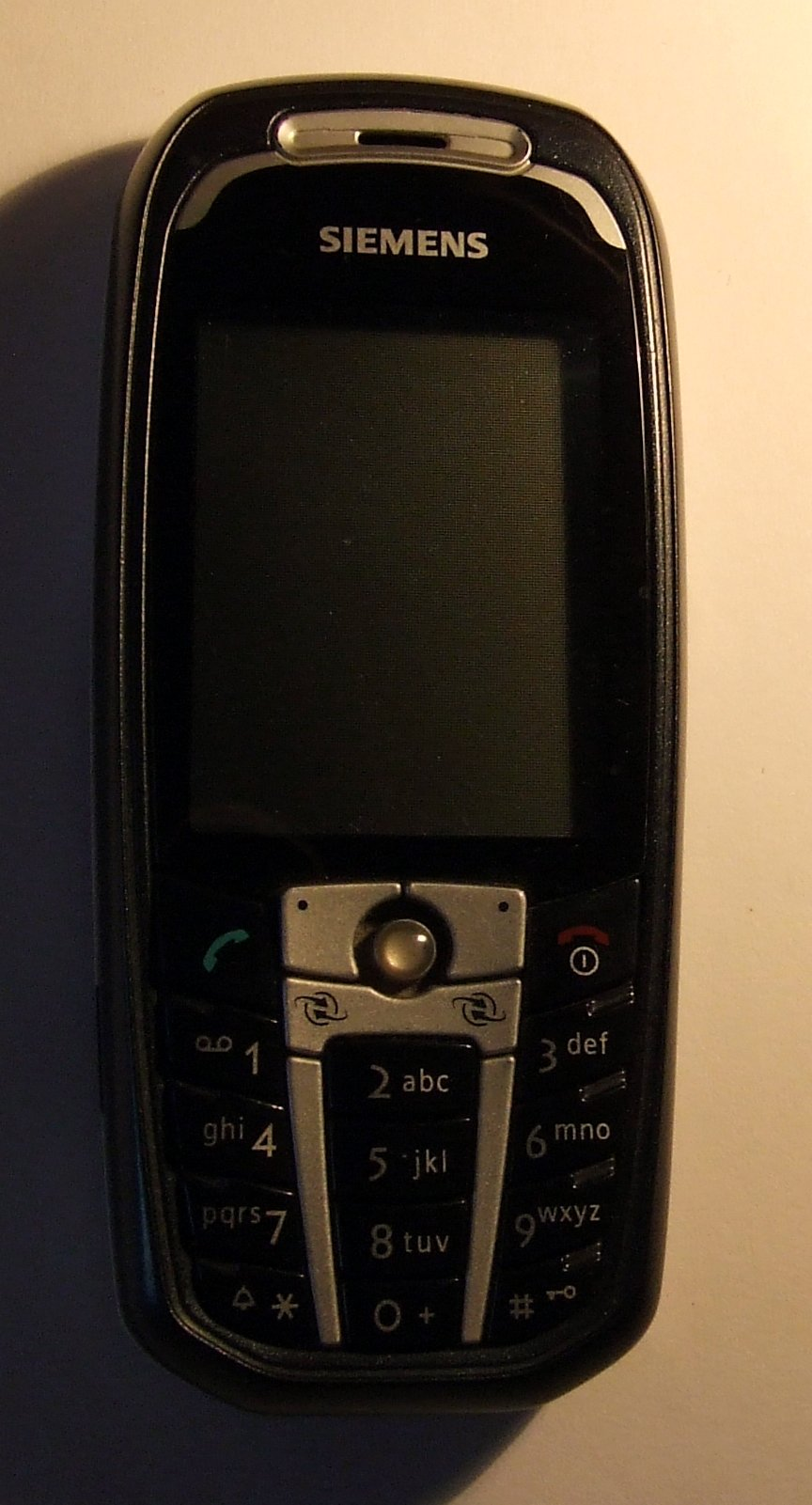
Siemens CXT70(T-Mobile), CXV70 (Vodafone) and CVV70 (CX70 family)

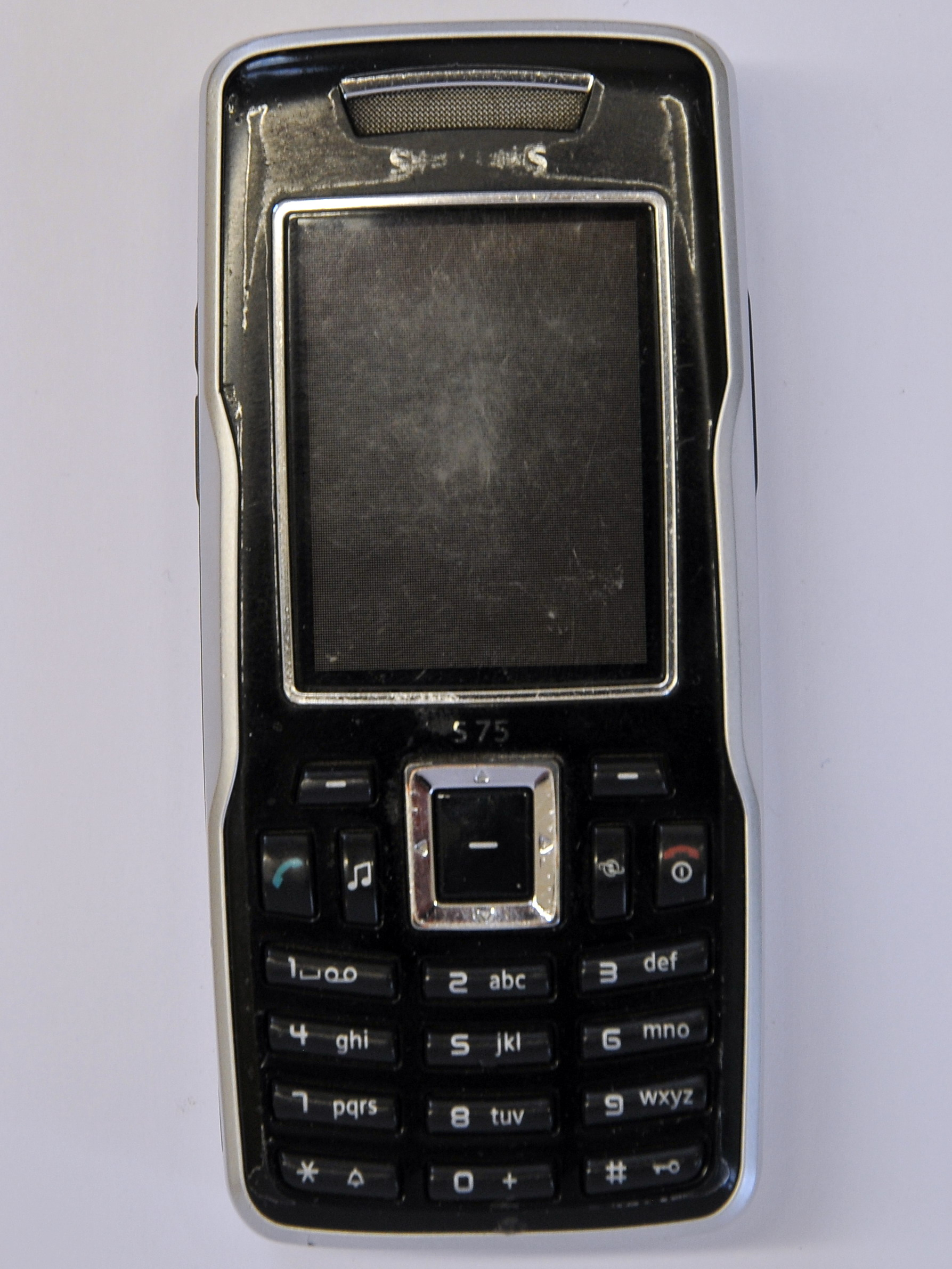
Siemens S75, The 2005 Flagship Model.

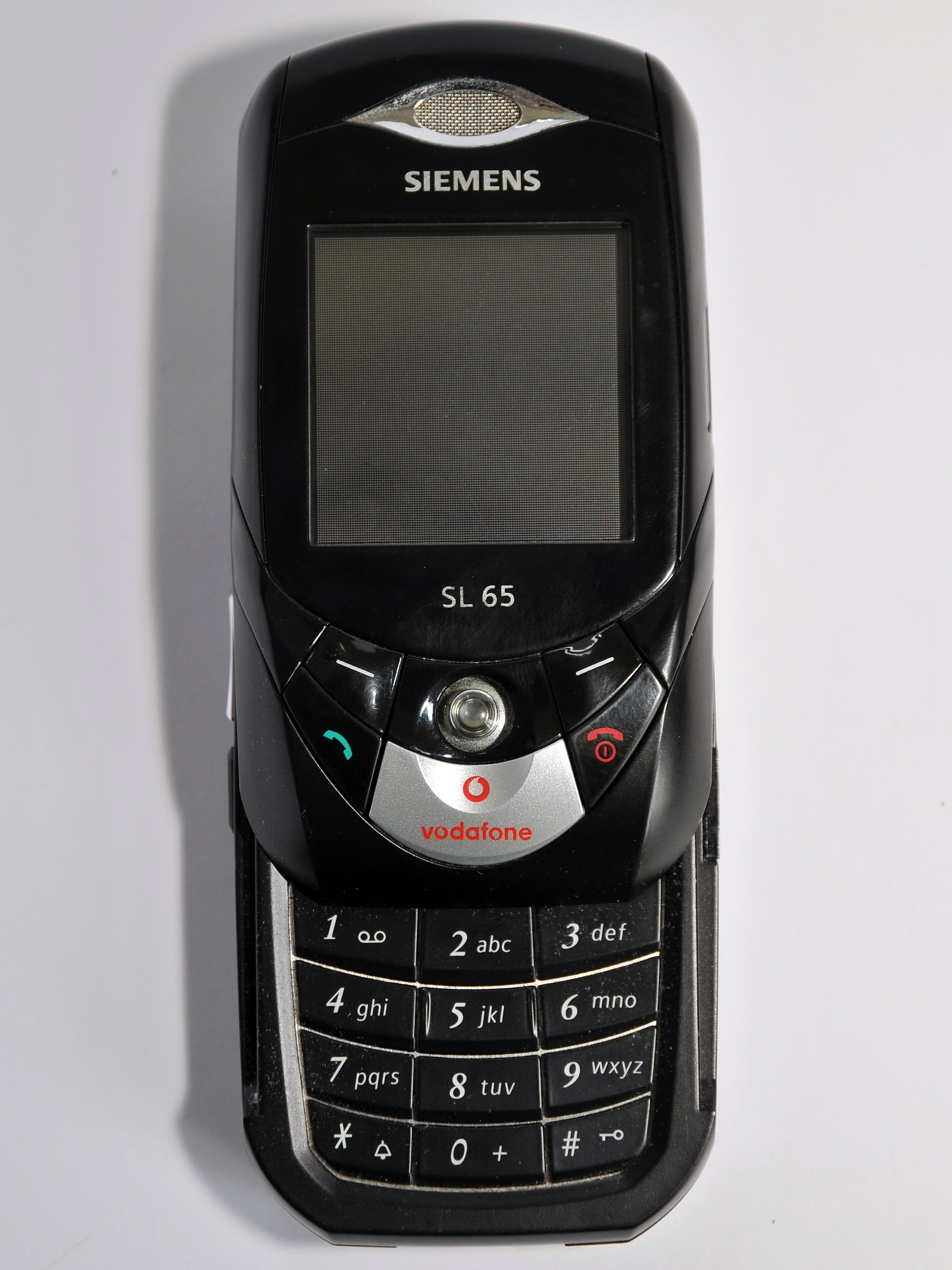
Siemens SL65, SL65v (Vodafone)

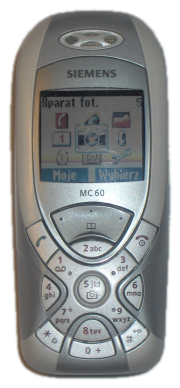
Siemens MC60 is the direct competitor with Nokia 3220

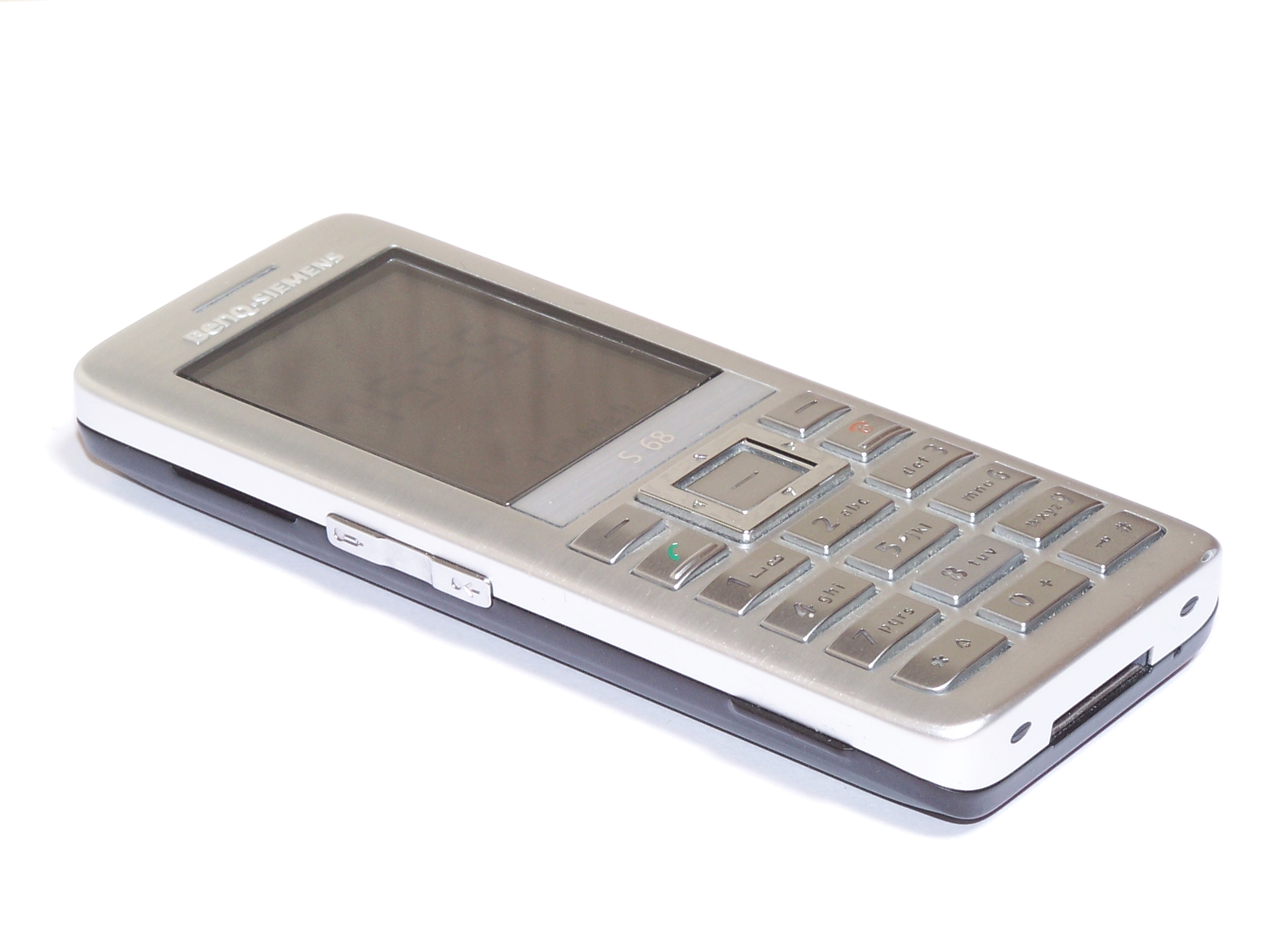
Siemens S68 (rebranding and selling in BenQ-Siemens S68, The SP65 successors.)

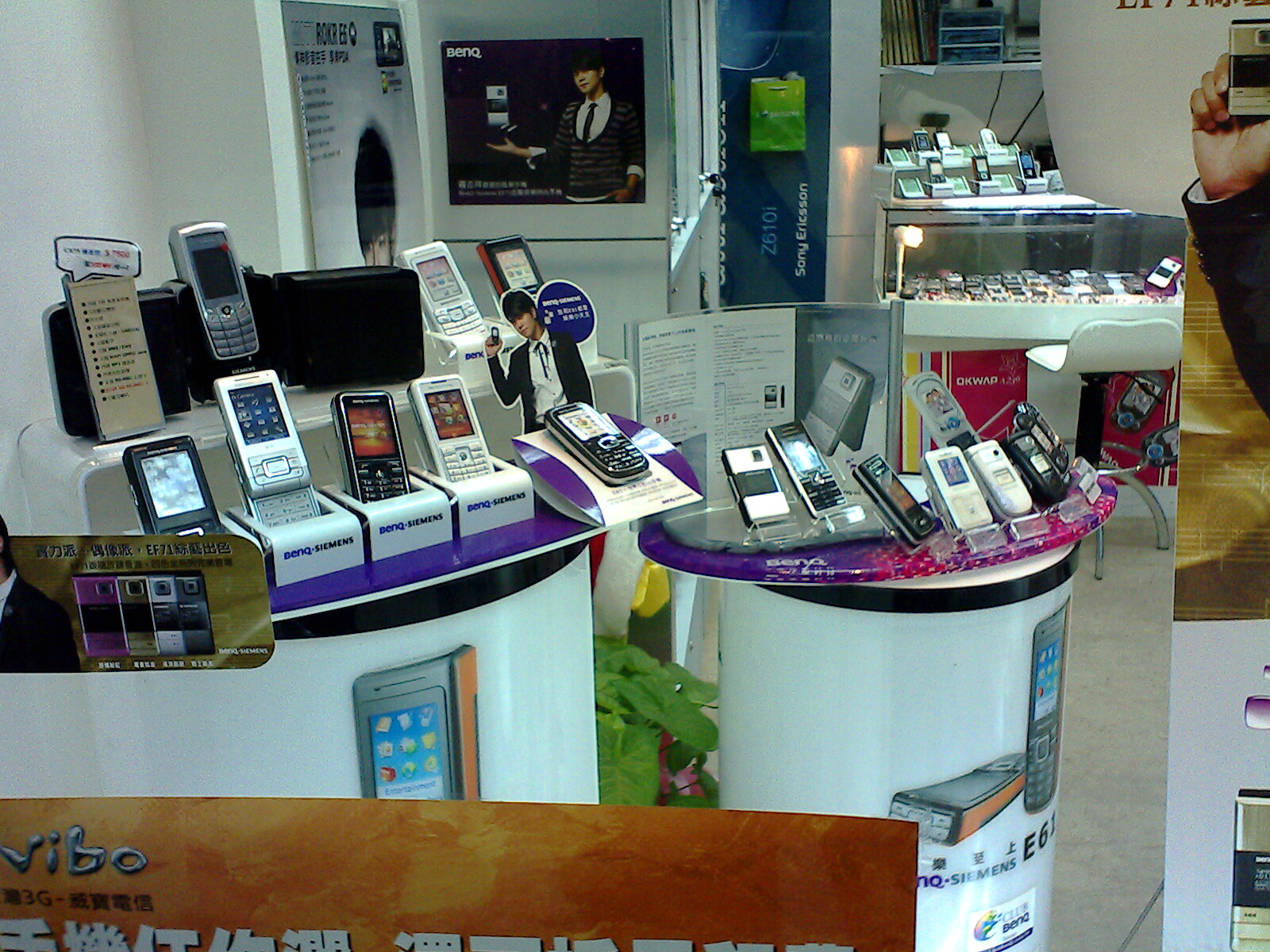
The new brand is called "BENQ-SIEMENS" with slogans "Keep Exploring"

== Sponsorships ==
Siemens Mobile had previously sponsored football clubs Cruzeiro (2004), Real Madrid (2002–2005), Olympiacos (2000–2005), Lazio (2000–2003) and Bordeaux (2000–2004).
