= S65 =

S65 may refer to:

== Automobiles ==
- BMW S65, an automobile engine
- Daihatsu Hijet (S65), a Japanese kei truck
- Mercedes-Benz S65 AMG, a sedan
- S-65 Stalinets, a Soviet tractor

== Rail ==
- S65 (Esko Prague), a commuter rail line in the Czech Republic
- S65, a Schaffhausen S-Bahn railway service in Switzerland and Germany

== Other uses ==
- Darkinjung language
- Greek submarine Triaina (S-65)
- INS Sindhurashtra (S65), a submarine of the Indian Navy
- Savoia-Marchetti S.65, an Italian racing seaplane
- Siemens S65, a mobile phone
- Sikorsky S-65, a family of heavy-lift transport helicopters
- S65, a postcode district in Rotherham, England
