= S40 =

S40 may refer to:

== Aircraft ==
- SABCA S.40, a Belgian trainer aircraft
- Sikorsky S-40, an American amphibious flying boat
- Spectrum S-40 Freedom, an American business jet

== Automobiles ==
- Suzuki Boulevard S40, a Japanese motorcycle
- Toyota Crown (S40), a Japanese luxury car
- Volvo S40, a Swedish automobile

== Electronics ==
- Canon PowerShot S40, a digital camera
- IBM NetVista S40, a personal computer
- Series 40, a software platform used in Nokia cell phones
- Siemens S40, a mobile phone

== Rail and transit ==
- S40 (New York City bus), United States
- S40 (ZVV), a line of Zurich S-Bahn in the cantons of Schwyz and Zurich, Switzerland
- S40, a regional railway service of Treni Regionali Ticino Lombardia in Italy and Switzerland
- S40, a line of Vienna S-Bahn in Austria

== Roads ==
- County Route S40 (Bergen County, New Jersey)
- New Jersey Route 72, designated Route S40 until 1953

== Submarines ==
- Brazilian submarine Riachuelo (S40)
- HMS Upholder (S40), a submarine of the Royal Navy
- INS Vela (S40), a submarine of the Indian Navy
- USS S-40 (SS-145), a submarine of the United States Navy

== Other uses ==
- S40 Racing, a 1997 freeware game
- S40: To clean the floor and all objects contaminated by this material use ... (to be specified by the manufacturer), a safety phrase
- Somua S40, a prototype French tank
- Sulfur-40, an isotope of sulfur
- S40, a postcode district in Chesterfield, England
