= Siemens C10 =

Mobile phone model

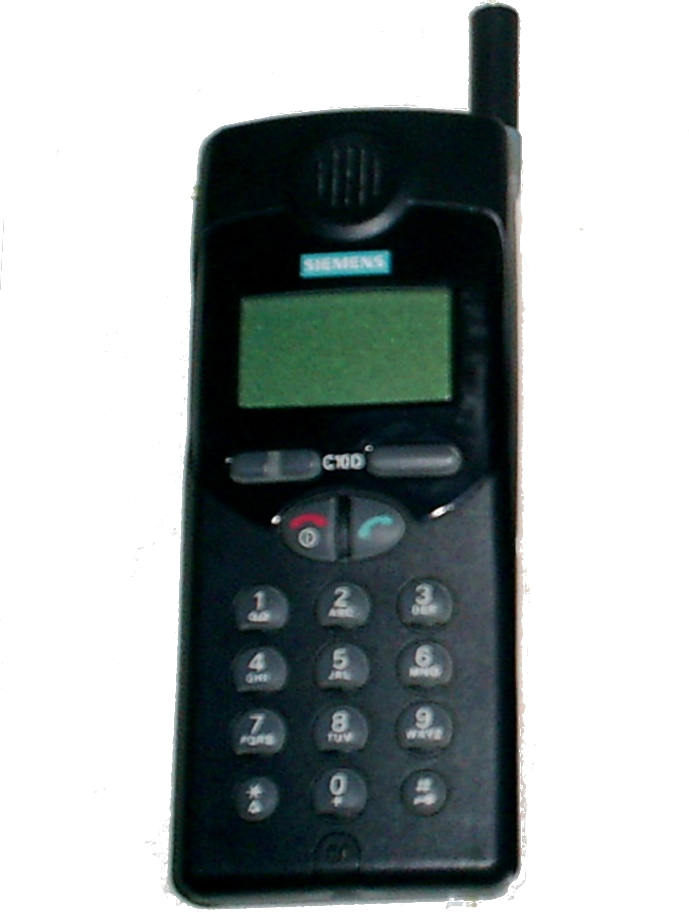
- Manufacturer: Siemens
- Released: December 1997
- Input: Physical buttons
- Connectivity: 2G
- Dimensions: 137 × 55 × 22 mm
- Weight: 165.0 g (including battery)
- Predecessor: Siemens C5
- Successor: Siemens C25

The Siemens C10 is a mobile phone made by Siemens in December 1997. The phone was available in four colours: blue, yellow, red and grey. The C10 had a green backlit display capable of showing three lines. It weighed 165 g with battery and 117 g without.
