= Siemens M55 =

Mobile phone

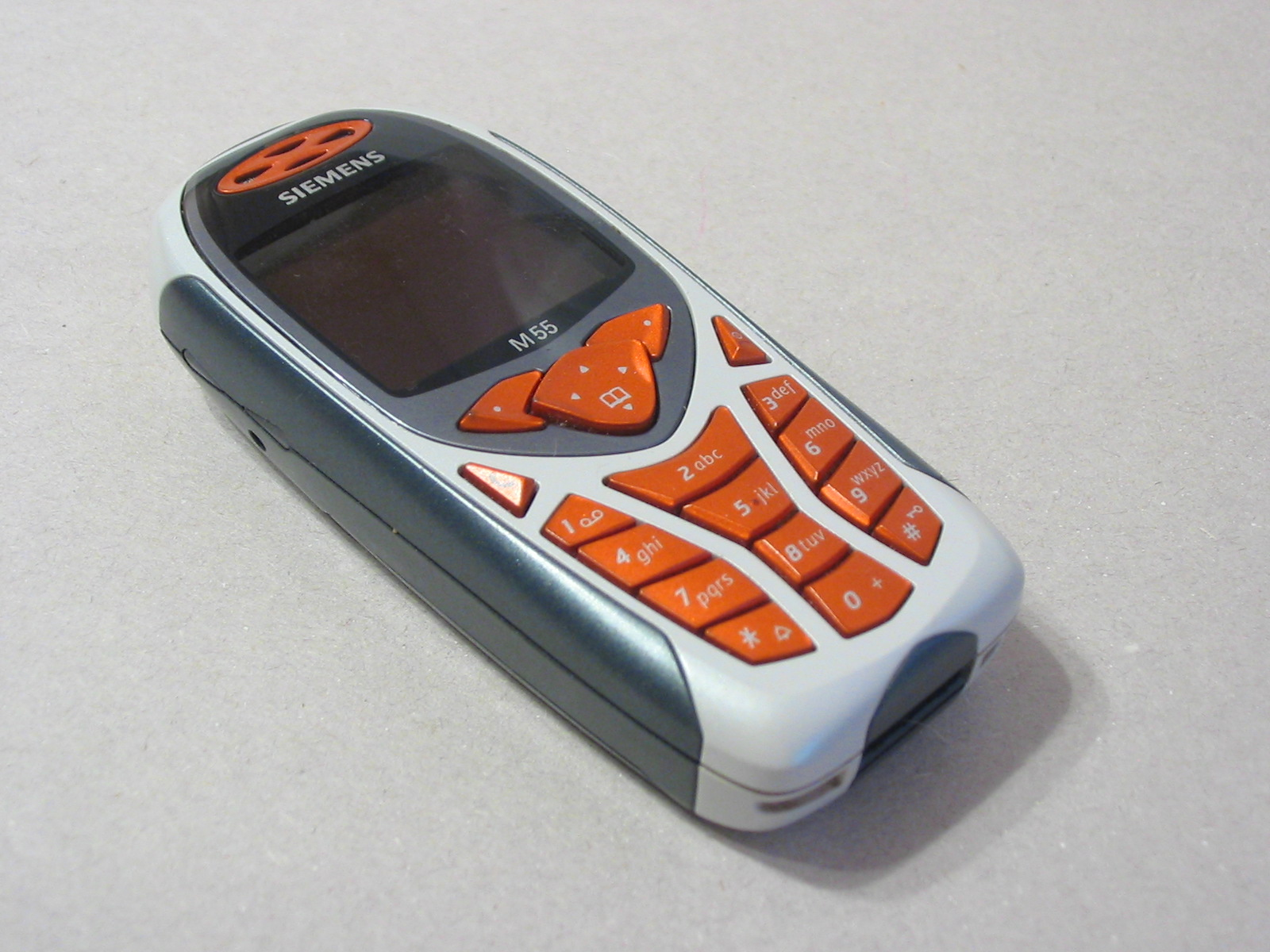
- Dimensions: 101×46×21 mm (3.98×1.81×0.83 in)
- Weight: 83 g (2.9 oz)
- Memory: 2 MB
- Display: 4096 colors (8 bit), 101 x 80 px

The Siemens M55 was a mobile phone introduced by Siemens in 2003. At the time, it was a high-end phone and one of the first color phones by Siemens, with a 4096 color screen. It was a lower-end counterpart of the Siemens S55, with Bluetooth and infrared connectivity removed. It had a 700mAh battery and no video recorder. Fully charged, it could last around 11 days without charging. There were two models of the M55: one with an orange keyboard and the other with a grey keyboard.
