= Siemens SF65 =

Mobile phone model

The SF65 was a mobile phone made by Siemens and launched in 2005. This project had been developed with Philips' Mobile division (France) for launching a "swipe displays form factor" called "Philips 760 Twists & Shots". It had various advantageous features, including the swivel phone face that enabled the phone to become a digital camera in its own right. The claim was made that the phone was both 100% phone and 100% camera. It features styling influenced by Apple's iPod, although it does not play MP3 files.

The phone itself is a clamshell flip phone, boasting a 1.3-megapixel camera, a mobile version of the much enjoyed game Worms, a high memory capacity of over 18 megabytes, and (although the phone lacked Bluetooth) the ability to send and receive data files via IrDA. The phone had an exceptional battery life, with a standby life of 400 hours, unlike other camera phones released around the same period.
