= Siemens S65 =

Cell phone model

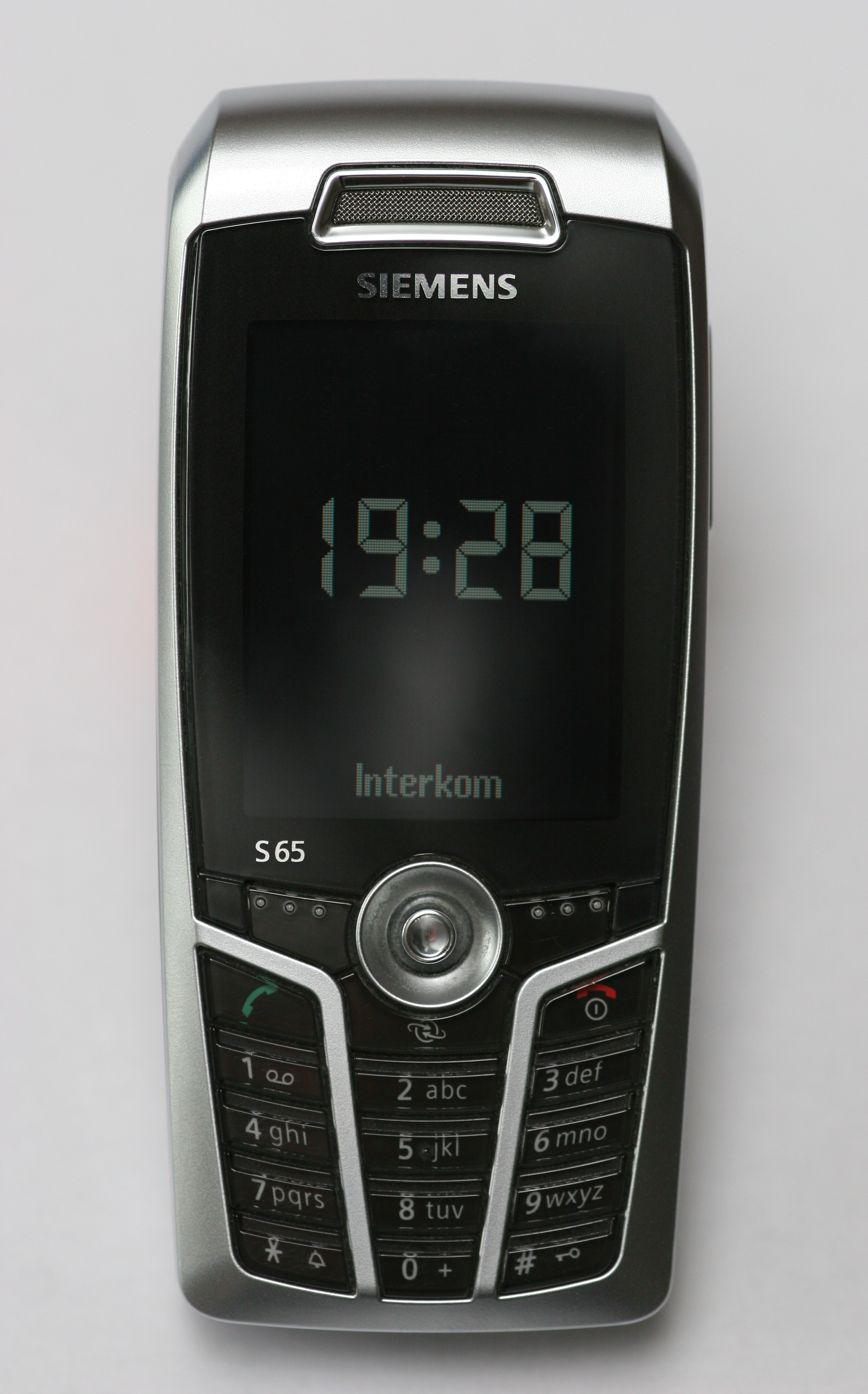
- The Siemens S65
- Series: Siemens S-Class Series
- First released: 2004
- Predecessor: Siemens S55
- Successor: Siemens S75
- Compatible networks: 900, 1800, 1900 MHz
- Dimensions: 109×48×18 mm (4.29×1.89×0.71 in) = 94 cm³
- Weight: 98 g (3 oz)
- Operating system: Siemens properties X65 platform
- Memory: 10 MB, RS-MMC hot swapping slot.
- Rear camera: 1.3 Megapixel
- Display: 132 x 176 px TFT, 65.000 colors (16 bit)
- Media: WAV, AAC, MP3, 3GP
- Connectivity: SMS; EMS; MMS; E-Mail; T9; IrDA; Bluetooth; GPRS (Class 10); WAP; Data & Fax modem
- Data inputs: Joysticks, Keyboards and RS-MMC hot swapping slot with maximum capacity support 128/256 MB. (needs to be upgraded lastly firmware versions.)

The Siemens S65 is a mobile phone by Siemens. It is bundled with a replaceable 32 MB MMC card. It also features a 1.3-megapixel digital camera. It was targeted to premium users.

A version for the corporate market, the Siemens SP65, was released without a camera due to camera phones often being prohibited.

== Cell phone reusage ==
Electronics hobbyists often rescue LCD from cell phones

- Siemens CX65, M65, S65 and SK65 have 132x176 pixel resolution with 16 bit definition based on 3 different chips:
- If module is called LPH88xxxx the controller is an Hitachi HD66773
- Module LS020xxx owns a Sharp device
- L2F50 is controlled with an Epson L2F50 chip
- C65 phones have a 130x130 pixel resolution with 16 bit LCD controlled by a Philips PCF8833
- Official support 256MB Multimedia Card unofficial to up 1GB only. Only SanDisk 7-pin card
- SanDisk with certificated Multimedia Card Associated
