= Siemens AX72 =

2005 mobile phone by Siemens

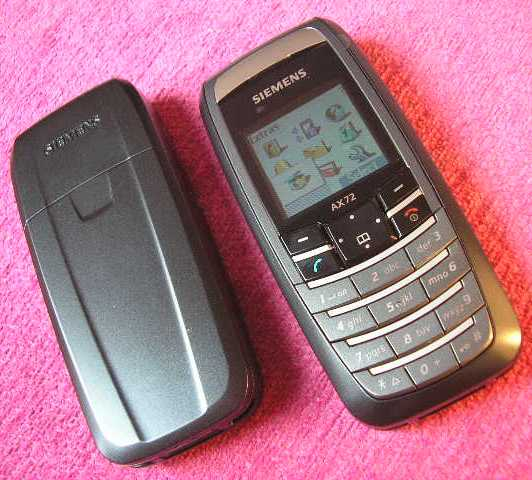
- Manufacturer: Siemens
- Availability by region: October 2005
- Predecessor: Siemens AP75
- Successor: Siemens SG75
- Dimensions: 105.6×46.8×17.5 mm (4.16×1.84×0.69 in)
- Weight: 75 g (3 oz)
- Memory: 1.5 MB
- Battery: Li-Ion 600 mAh
- Rear camera: Attachable
- Connectivity: GSM 900 / 1800 / 1900
- Other: BenQ-Siemens, Siemens Mobile

The Siemens AX72 is a mobile phone introduced by Siemens in October, 2005. It weighs 79 g and its dimensions are 105,6 x 46,8 x 17,5 mm (length x width x depth). Its display a CSTN 65K colors LCD.

The phone's battery powers the phone for 5 hours talk time, or up to 220 hours if left in stand-by mode. It also supports SMS sending and receiving.

== Characteristics ==
- General:
  - 2G Network: GSM 900 / 1800 / 1900
  - Announced: 2005, October
  - Status: Discontinued
- Size:
  - Dimensions: 105.6 x 46.8 x 17.5 mm
  - Weight: 79 g
  - Display Type: CSTN, 65K colors
  - Size: 128 x 128 pixels - 5-way navigation key
- Ringtones:
  - Type: Polyphonic (32 channels)
  - Customization: Download
  - Vibration: Yes
- Memory:
  - Phonebook: Yes
  - Call records: 10 dialed, 10 received, 10 missed calls
  - Card slot: No - 1.5 MB free memory
- Data:
  - GPRS: Class 8 (4+1 slots), 32 - 40 kbit/s
  - HSCSD: No
  - EDGE: No
  - 3G: No
  - WLAN: No
  - Bluetooth: No
  - Infrared port: No
  - USB: Yes
- Features:
  - Messaging: SMS, EMS, MMS
  - Browser WAP: 1.2.1
  - Games: Yes
  - Colors: Basalt Black
  - Camera: No
  - Java: MIDP 1.0
    - T9
    - Calendar
    - Built-in handsfree
    - External flash as accessory
    - Optional digital camera (VGA 640 x 480)
- Battery:
  - Standard battery, Li-Ion 600 mAh
    - Stand-by Up: to 220 h
    - Talk time: Up to 5 h
