= Siemens A40 =

Cell phone model (2001)

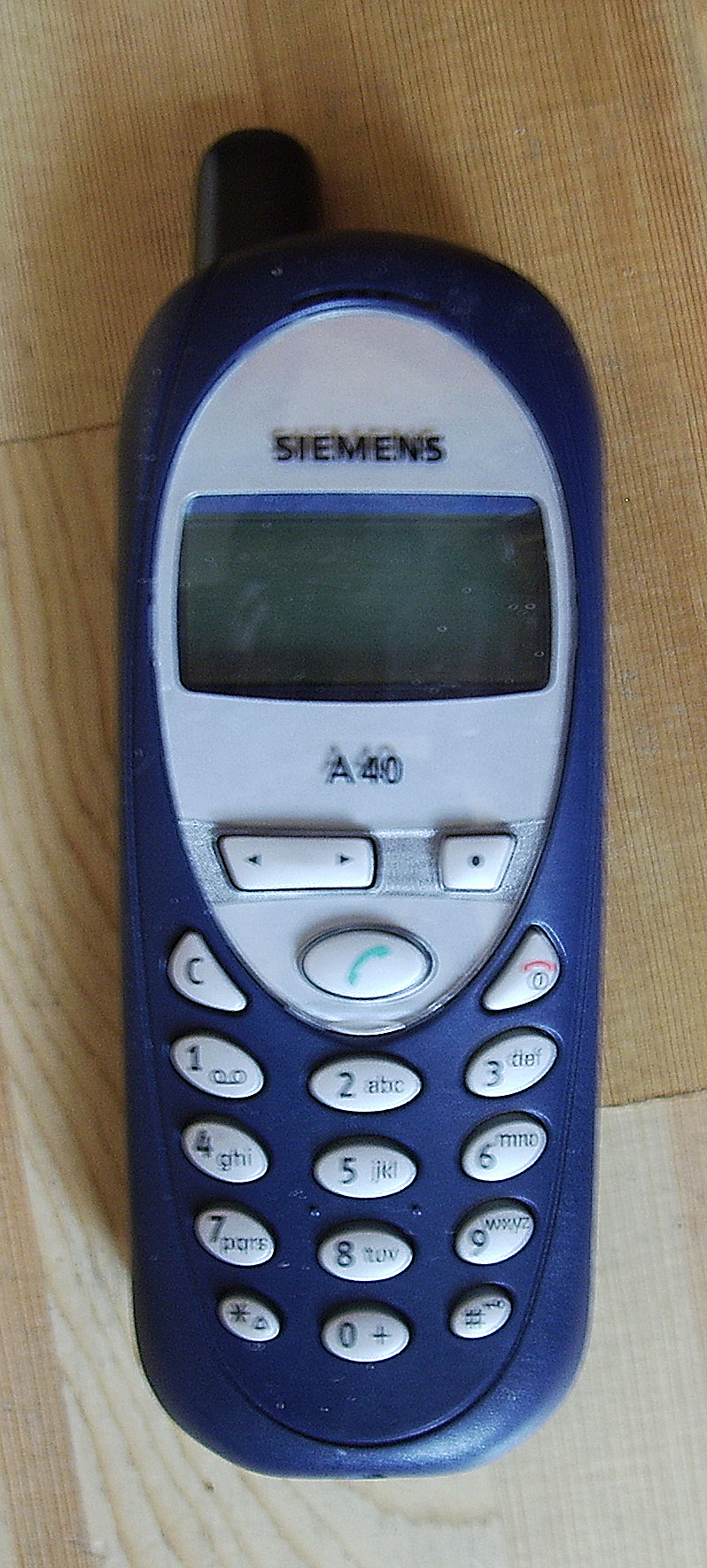
- Manufacturer: Siemens AG
- First released: 2001
- Form factor: Bar
- Colors: Royal Blue, Anthracite, Raspberry Red
- Dimensions: 118×46×27 mm (4.6×1.8×1.1 in)
- Weight: 4.3 oz (120 g)
- Operating system: Siemens Mobile
- Battery: NiMH 600 mAh, removable
- Display: Alphanumeric, 2 x 16 chars Dedicated icon-line

The Siemens A40 is a mobile phone manufactured by the defunct mobile phone company Siemens and released in 2001. The design is compact, available in 3 color options: Royal Blue, Anthracite, and Raspberry Red.
