= Siemens A50 =

Cell phone model by Siemens AG

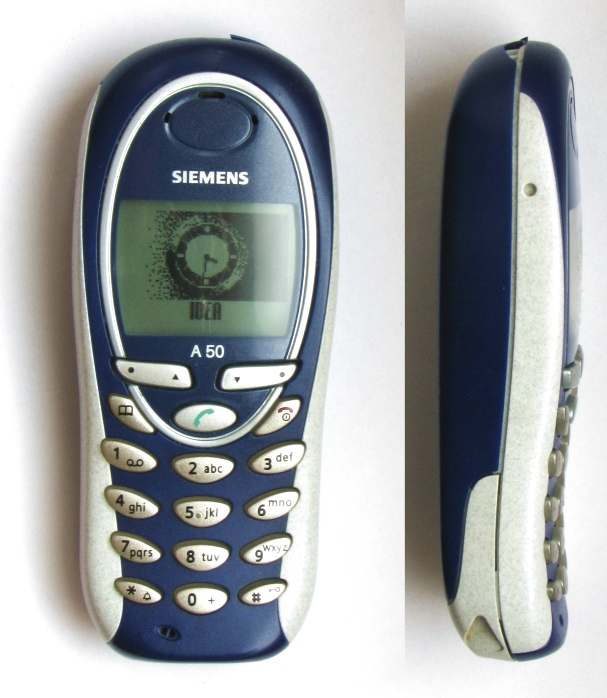
- Manufacturer: Siemens Mobile
- Dimensions: 109×46×23 mm (4.29×1.81×0.91 in)
- Weight: 95 g (3 oz)
- Memory: 50 contacts, 10 calls missed/received/dialed
- Battery: Removable Li-Ion of 650mAh
- Display: 101 x 64px, monochrome
- Connectivity: GSM

Siemens A50 is a mobile phone manufactured by Siemens Mobile. It was one of the best sold mobile phones from 2002. The phone was announced in October 2002.

The phone included a WAP browser and two games: Stack Attack and Balloon Shooter.
