= Siemens ME45 =

Mobile phone model by Siemens

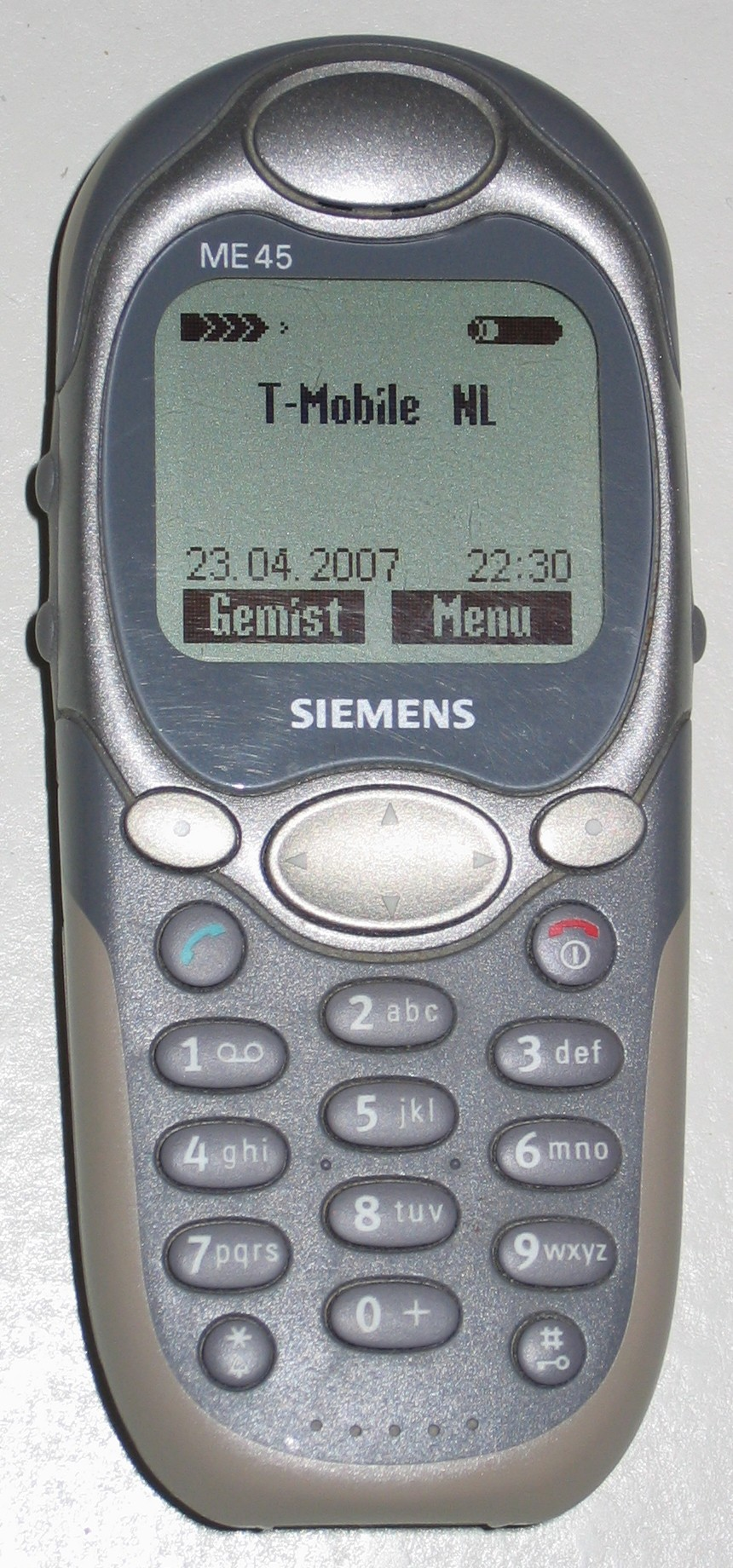
ME45 safari-grey

Siemens ME45 is a GSM-900/1800 cell phone, designed for enhanced durability. It weighs 99 g, and contains monochrome screen, supports WAP and GPRS. It includes electronics identical to Siemens S45 phone, and it can be flashed with software from Siemens S45i (adds email client).

It was introduced in 2001. In 2002, a software update was offered.

The main advantage of ME45 is its resistance to dust, shock and water.

The Siemens ME45 is used by Jason Bourne in the 2004 film The Bourne Supremacy.
