= Siemens SX45 =

PDA mobile phone model

The Siemens SX45 is a PDA mobile phone released by Siemens in 2001. It was one of the first Pocket PCs with mobile phone functionality. Because of its size and the fact that phone calls could only be made using a headset, it was not really in the same marketing segment as current smartphones.

It was replaced by the Siemens SX56.

== Specifications ==
Software Environment:

- Operating System: Microsoft Pocket PC (Rapier) CE 3.0

Microprocessor :

- CPU: 64bit NEC VR4122 MIPS class II
- CPU Clock: 150 MHz

Memory, Storage capacity:

- ROM capacity: 16 MB
- RAM capacity: 32 MB
- Hard Disk capacity: 1 Gb IBM MicroDrive accessed through Compact Flash slot

Display:

- Display Type: Colour transflective TFT, 65536 scales
- Display Resolution: 240 x 320
- Display Diagonal: 3.5 "

Sound:

- Microphone: Mono
- Speaker: Mono
- Audio Output: Siemens specific Lumberg jack

Cellular Phone:

- Cellular Networks: GSM900, GSM1800
- Cellular Data Link: CSD,(GPRS only available on SX45i)
- Call Alert: 1 -chord melody

Control Peripherals:

- Positioning Device: Touch screen
- Primary Keyboard: Not supported
- Directional Pad: 4 -way block & Jog / Scroll Wheel

Interfaces:

- Expansion Slots: CF I., CF II., MMC, SD
- Serial: RS-232, 115200bit/s
- USB: USB 1.1 client, 12 Mbit/s, Proprietary connector
- Infrared Gate: 115200bit/s (SIR/CIR)
- Bluetooth: Not supported
- Wireless LAN: Via Wireless Compact Flash (symbol Networker)

Multimedia Telecommunication

- Analog TV: Not supported
- Analog Radio: Via Radio CF card

Power Supply

- Battery : Lithium-ion, removable
- Battery Capacity: 1550 mAh
