= Siemens MC60 =

Mobile phone model by Siemens

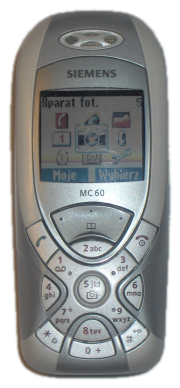
Siemens MC60

The Siemens MC60 was a mobile phone sold by Siemens. It weighs 86 g and has improved resistance to water, shock and dust when compared with previous models. The phone also includes digital imaging and picture messaging. Its integrated camera takes pictures simply by holding the 5 key, then pressing it again. The Siemens MC60 has a number of pre-installed polyphonic ring tones, additionally own ringtones can be recorded.

The MC60 has a built-in phonebook for 100 entries, each of which holds only one number. All entries are shown in a single list, if desired, you can list the memory of the phone and card separately. There are 20 cells of voice dialing. Entries can be grouped; there are 8 non-removable groups that can be renamed at will.

The phone was sold through multiple networks, like Orange S.A. and Gruppo TIM.
