= Siemens C75 =

Mobile phone

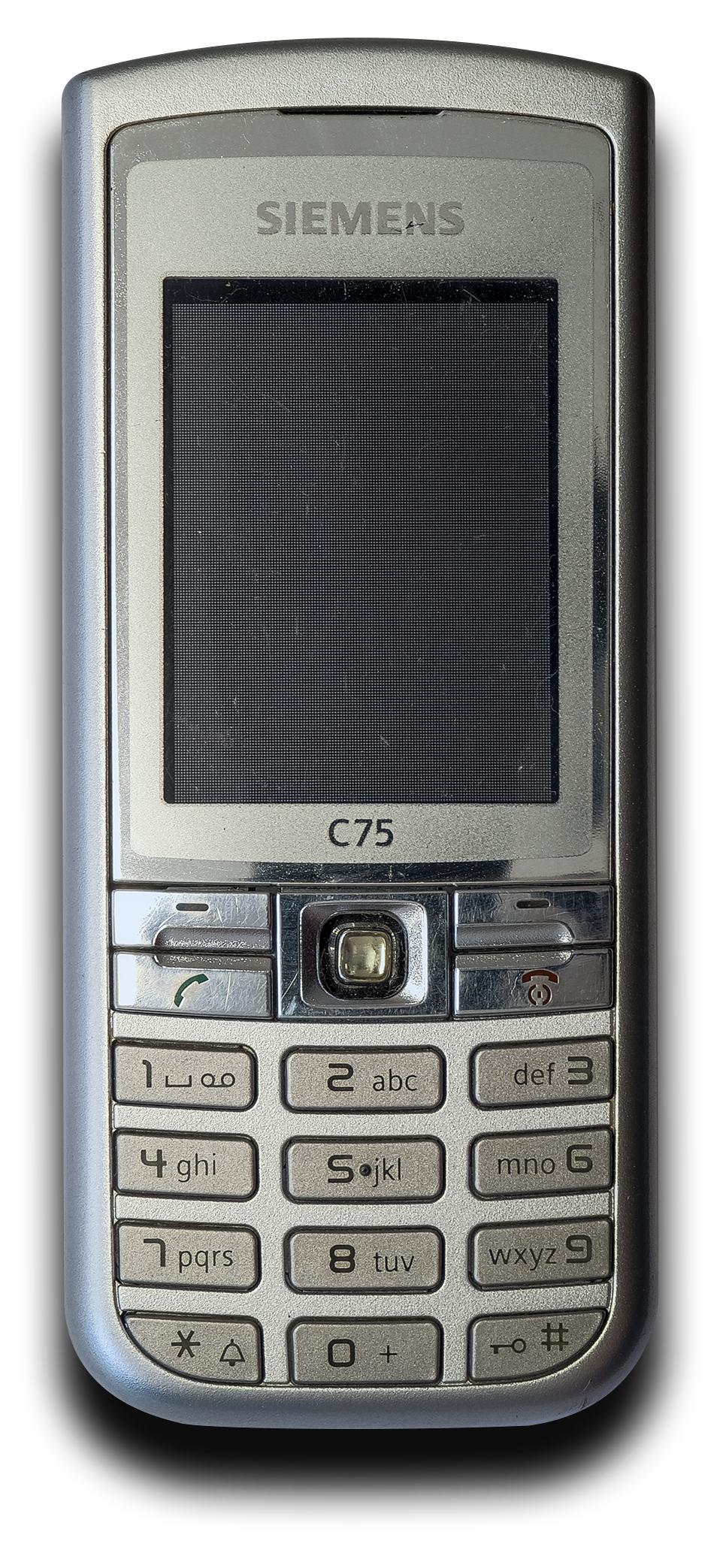
Siemens C75

The Siemens C75 is a mobile phone sold by Siemens. The C75 is a triband cameraphone. It weighs 85 g and dimensions are 103 x 44 x 17 mm (length x width x depth). It includes GPRS class 10 connections with WAP 2.0 capability and IrDA. It supports polyphonic ringtones in MIDI and WAV formats. It has 10,2 MB of onboard memory available for the user. The phone also includes digital imaging and picture messaging. It has a built-in camera capable of taking pictures in VGA resolution (640 x 480 pixels) and recording videos. It also supports SMS archiving.

== Siemens C75 Ronaldo Edition and Siemens ME75 ==
In June 2006 Siemens decided to make a newer version of C75. The only difference is that the phone has Ronaldo's autograph on its backside.

Siemens has released the C75 platform with a newer model had called “ME75” this phones just between new “M” Class (Military/IP54 approvals) and “E”/“C” (Entry level users/ Consumers) Class of Siemens Mobile
