= Xelibri =

Mobile phone range created by Siemens Mobile

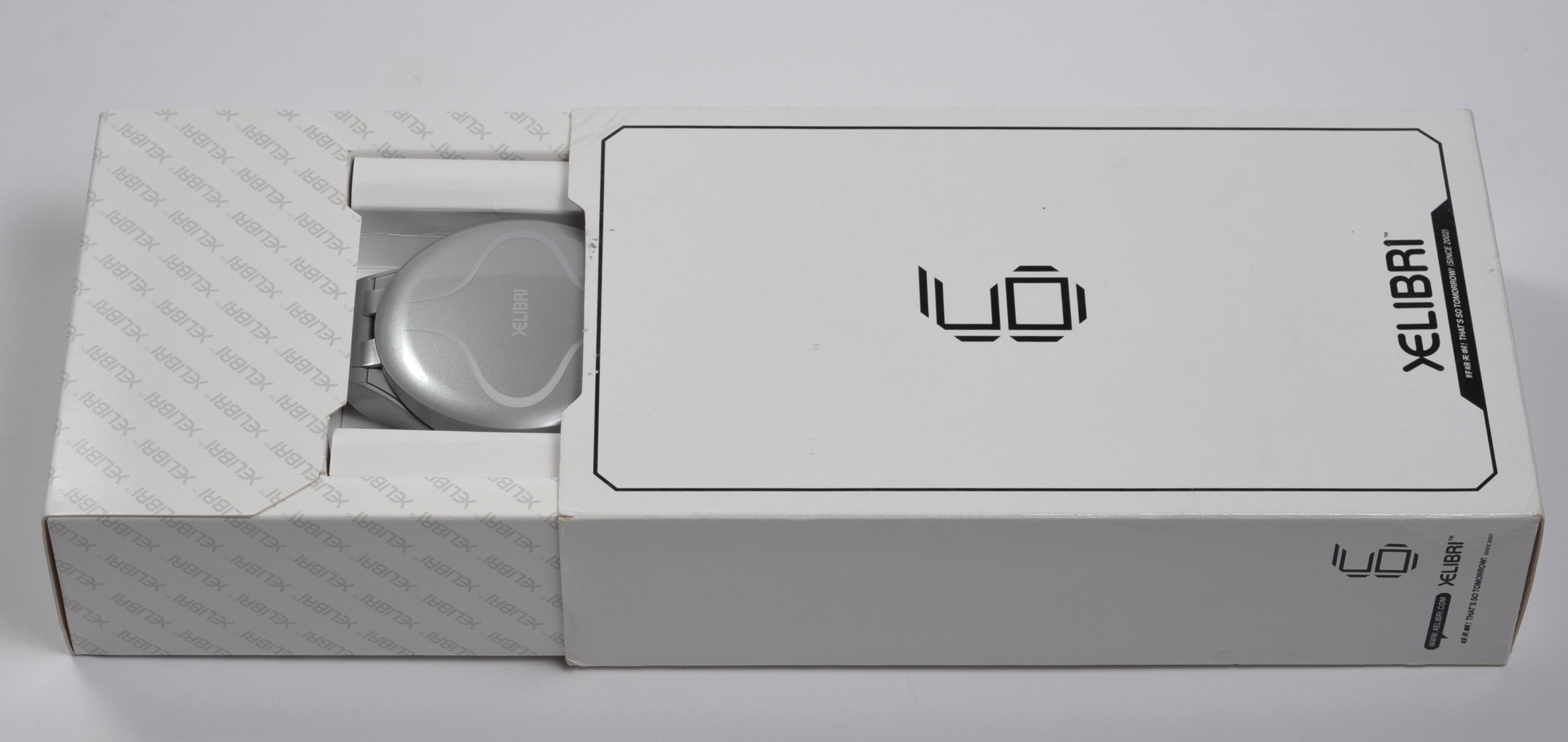
All Xelibri models were packaged in this slide-out box.

Xelibri, stylized as >ELIBRI (pronounced "ex-elibrii") was a fashion-oriented range of mobile phones created by Siemens Mobile and introduced in January 2003. Two "collections" each consisting of four unusual phones, released before the Xelibri project was dropped due to poor sales in 2004. The first Space on Earth (2003 Q2, Xelibri 1 to 4) collection with its Star Trek influences was designed in-house by Siemens whilst the second Fashion Extravaganza (2003 Q4, Xelibri 5 to 8) collection was contracted out to IDEO design. All Xelibri phones had GSM Dual Band with SMS (Short Message Service) and EMS (Enhanced Message Service).

The Xelibri division was headed by George Appling. Appling said to the media that "sixty percent" of the world don't need Xelibri, and that they are going after the 40 percent "who rank design as their top priority." The initial strategy was two "collections" every year. Although the phones were designed by top designers, marketed as fashion accessories and sold at a high price, the designs were strange and quite detached from what a fashion and style conscious consumer would be looking for in a mobile phone. Xelibri phones also lacked a recognizable brand name, with the highly regarded "SIEMENS" logo only appearing on the battery cover of the phones.

Expensive advertising and well-placed sales stands in department stores did nothing to help the sales figures of the Xelibri range. Although on the outside the designs were eye-catching and experimental, the technology inside the phones was nothing more than low end unsophisticated Siemens models which lacked all but the most basic features (voice and SMS). This, when coupled with strange keypad design, made the phones quite difficult and cumbersome to use.

In May 2004, Siemens dropped the Xelibri range. Only 780,000 units were sold in 2003, less than 2% of Siemens' total handset sales.

== Xelibri Products ==
=== Xelibri 1 ===
Xelibri 1 was a phone announced on January 27, 2003 and weighed 65 grams. It was described as a "Retro-Futuristic Classic" in the press release with its launch and was offered in two colors: Smoke and Champagne. The Xelibri 1 cost €199 and was described as "easy on the eye and smooth on the edges" by Siemens. Overall, it was pretty standard for the time supporting voice calls and SMS but it also included a "white light on black display" and "a retro lighting concept". Up to 4 hours of talk time, (up to) 200 hours of standby, and it has a removable Li-Ion 610 mAh battery.

== Gallery ==
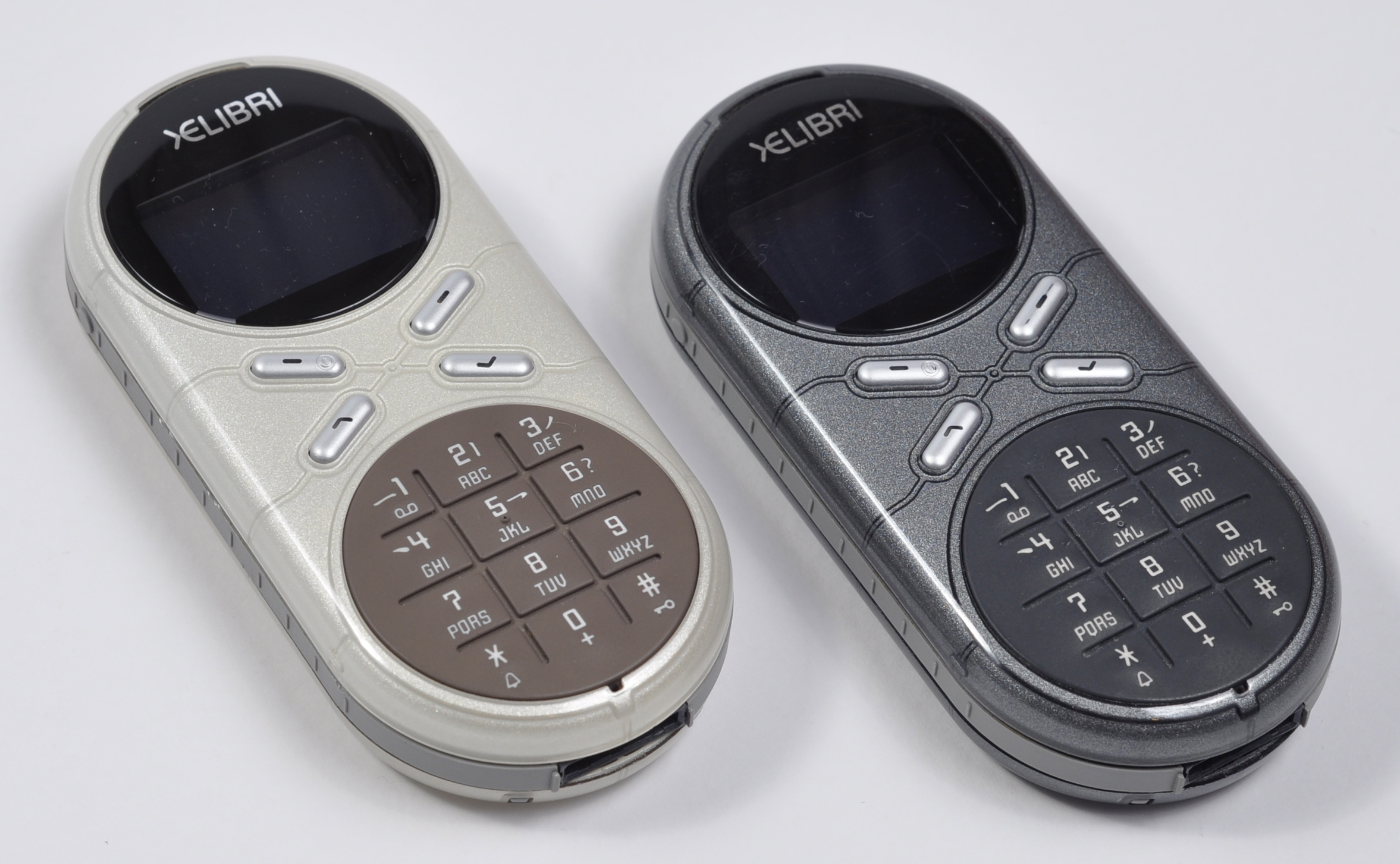
Xelibri 1 "The Retro-Futuristic Classic" in Champagne (left) and Smoke (right)

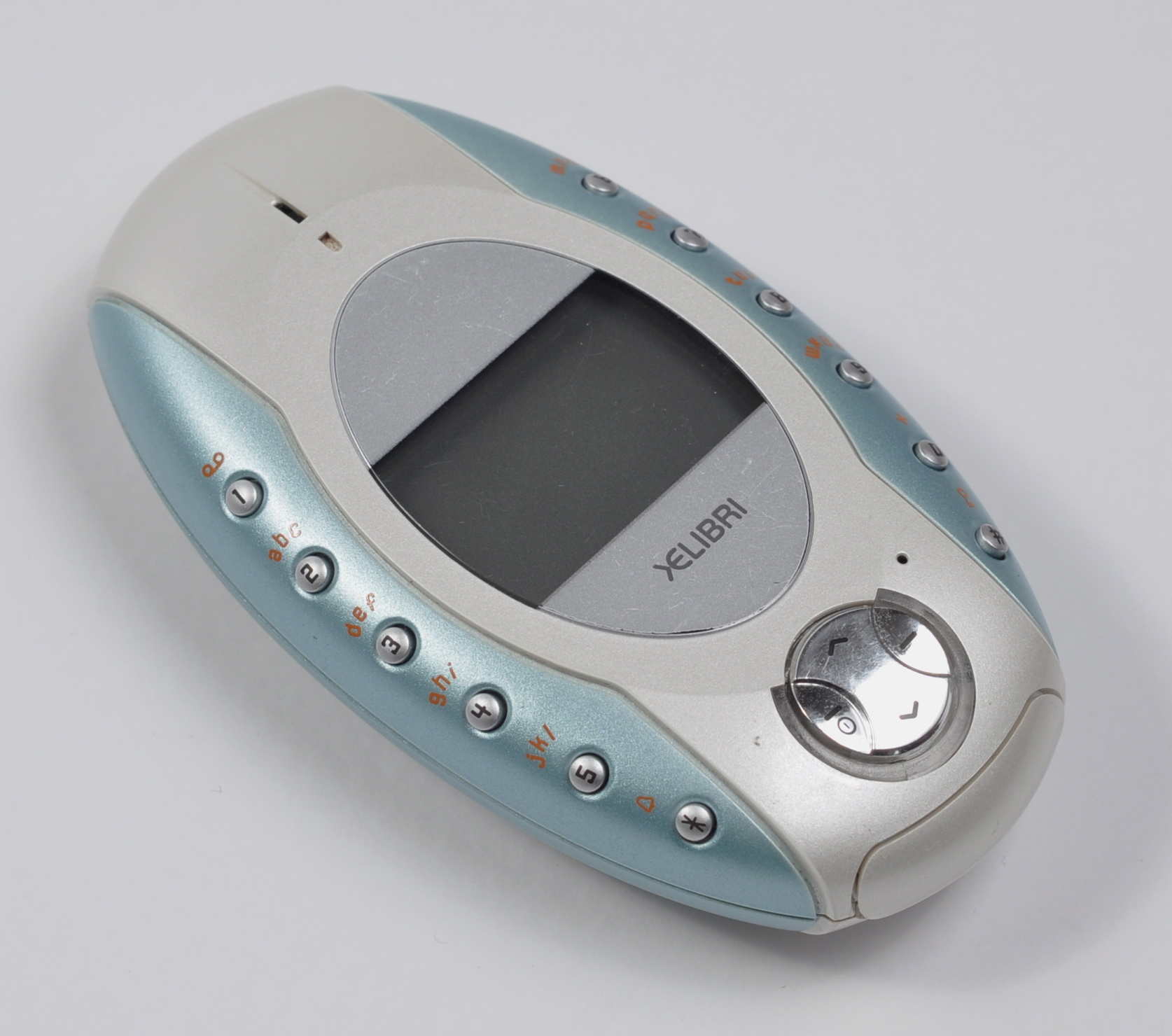
Xelibri 2 "The Alien Beauty" in Aqua

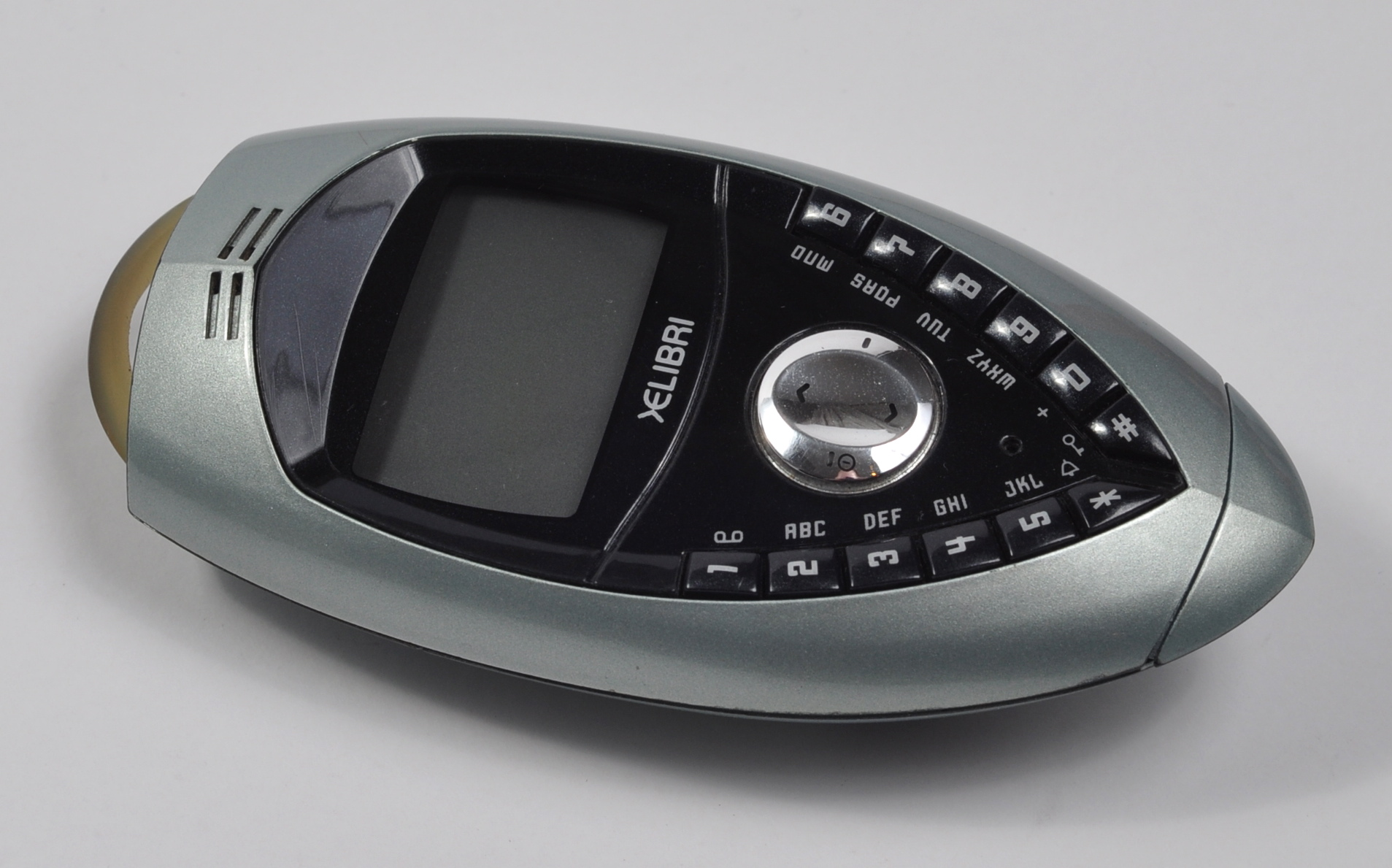
Xelibri 4 "The Dark Hero" in Verdigris

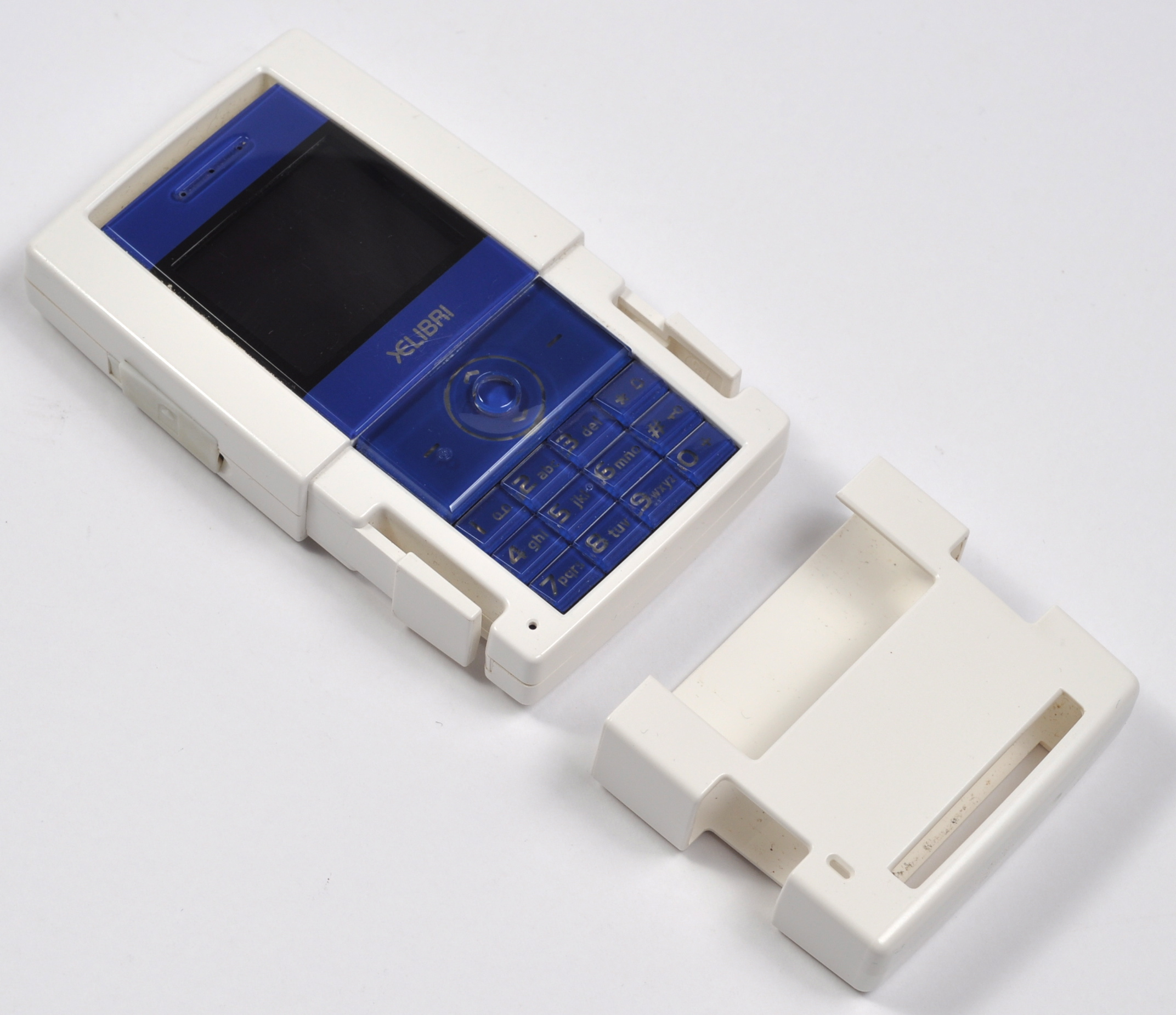
Xelibri 5 in Ultrablue

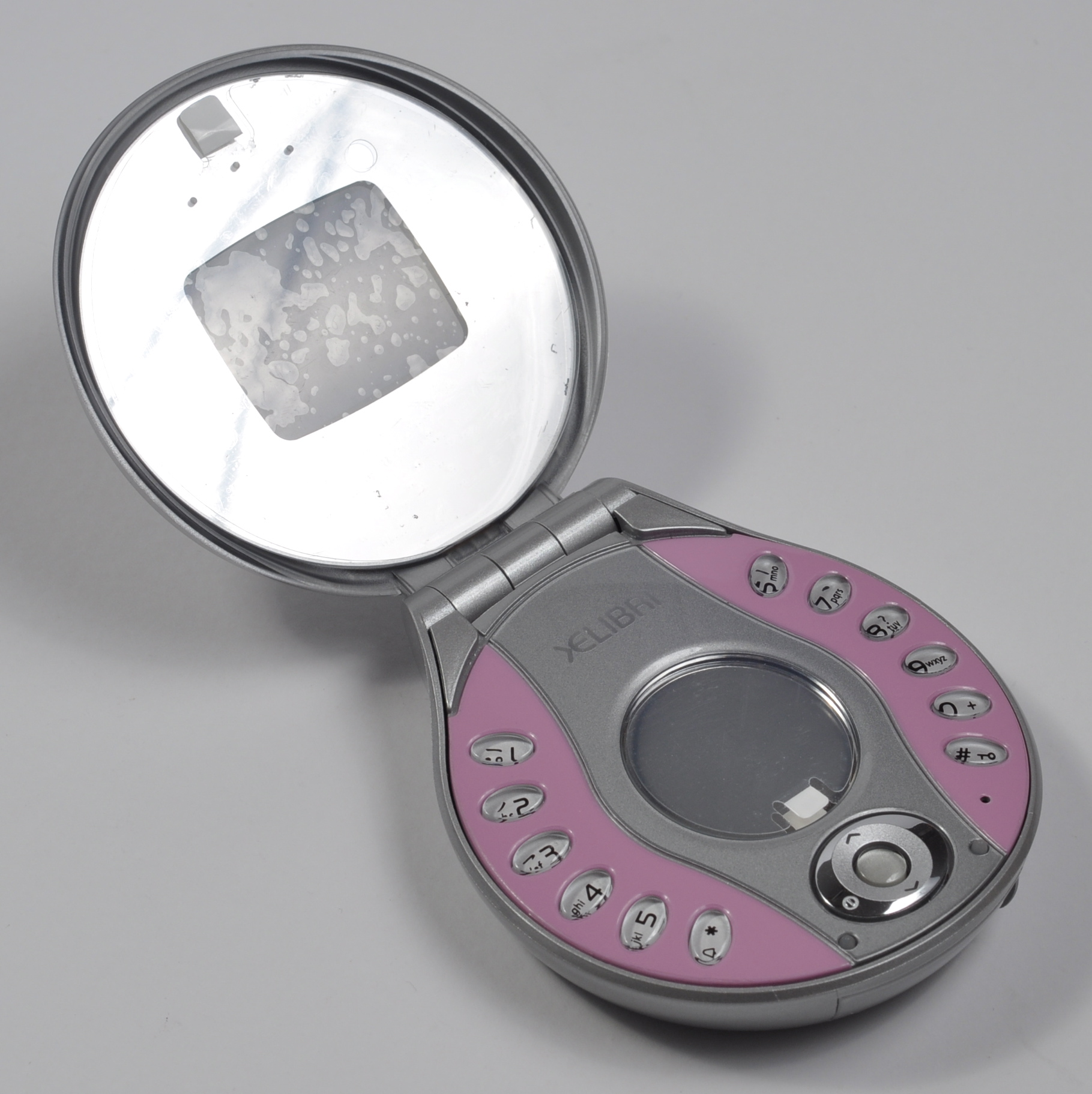
Xelibri 6 in Platinum Blush

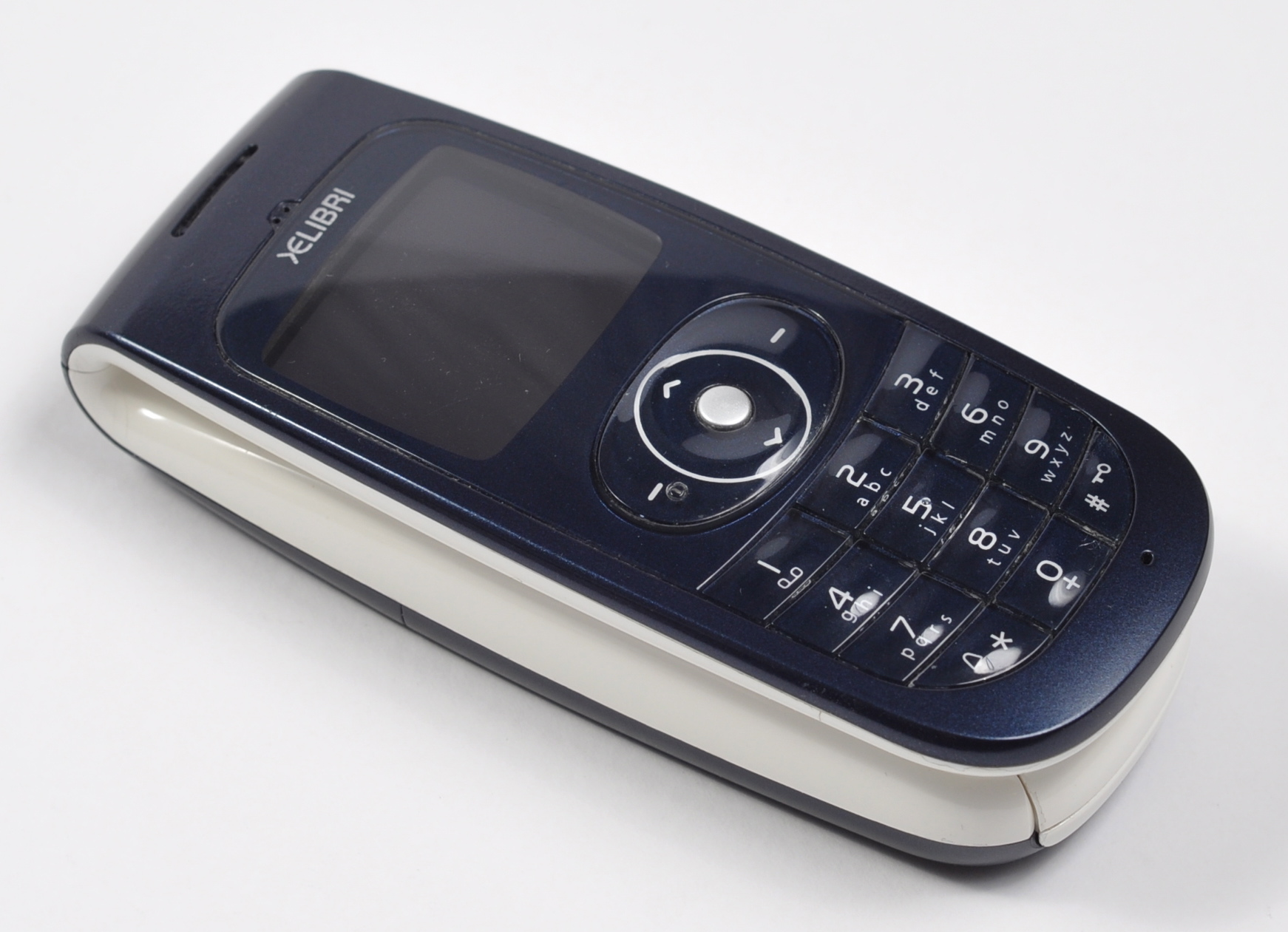
Xelibri 7 in Midnight Blue
