= Siemens M65 =

Mobile phone model

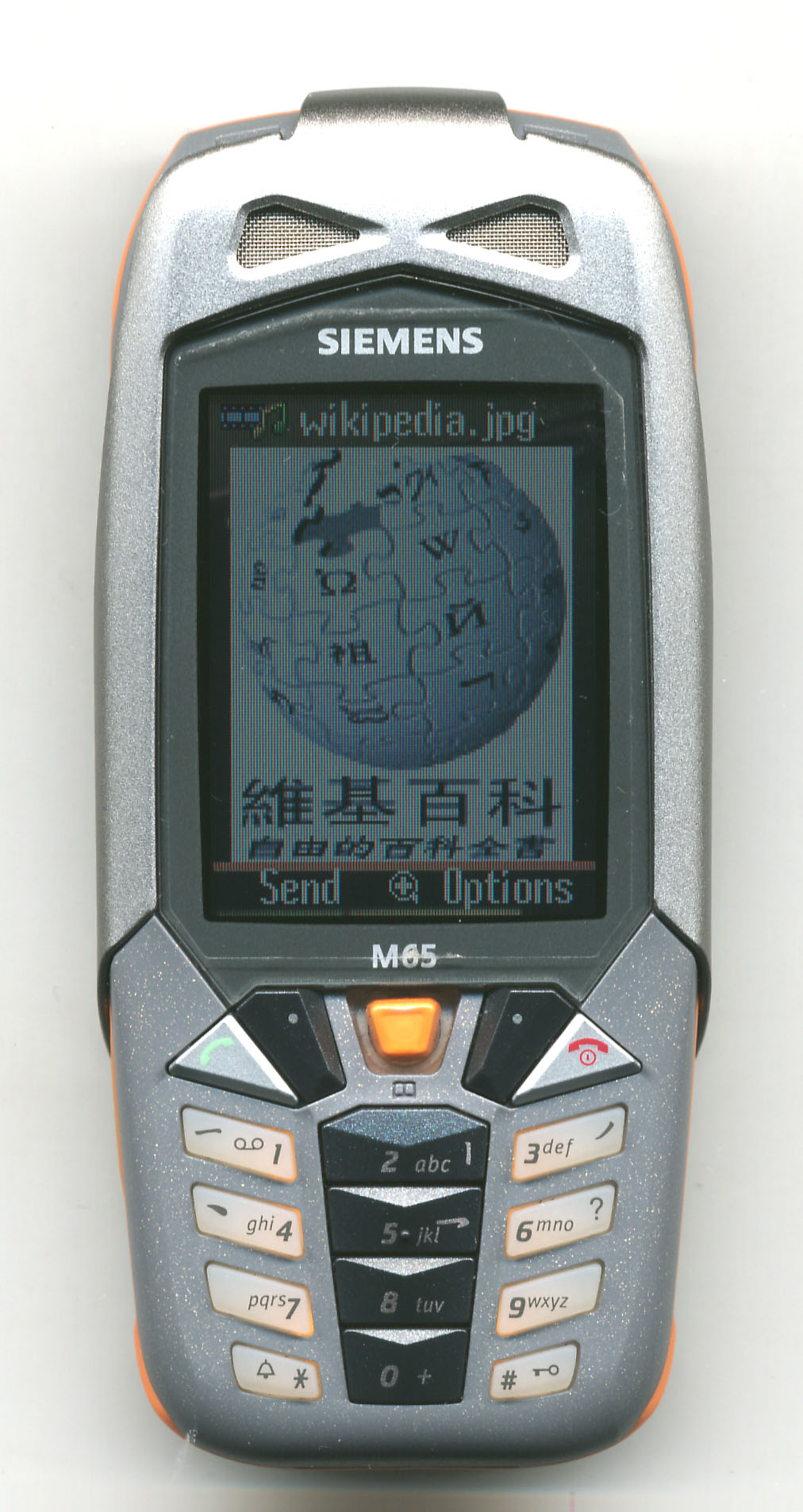
Siemens M65

The Siemens M65 was a mobile phone by Siemens Mobile. It was announced in 2004 and released on the 1. of February, 2005 and sold in Germany at 379€.

The phone is 109 × 49 × 19 mm^{3} large and features a backlit number keypad, 132 × 176 pixel 16-bit color, TFT display, as well as a backside 0.3 MP video camera with VGA color. It is resistant to shock, water, and dust damage.

According to Siemens, the removable 750 mAh battery can last up to 300 hours in standby mode and 5 hours when actively in use.

The phone comes with several productivity applications, as well as a few games, and can connect to the internet via a cellular connection. It lacks any Wi-Fi functionality, but includes an infrared sensor.

The 11 MB internal storage can only accommodate 14 phone book and up to 300 call history entries.
