= Siemens C25 =

Mobile phone

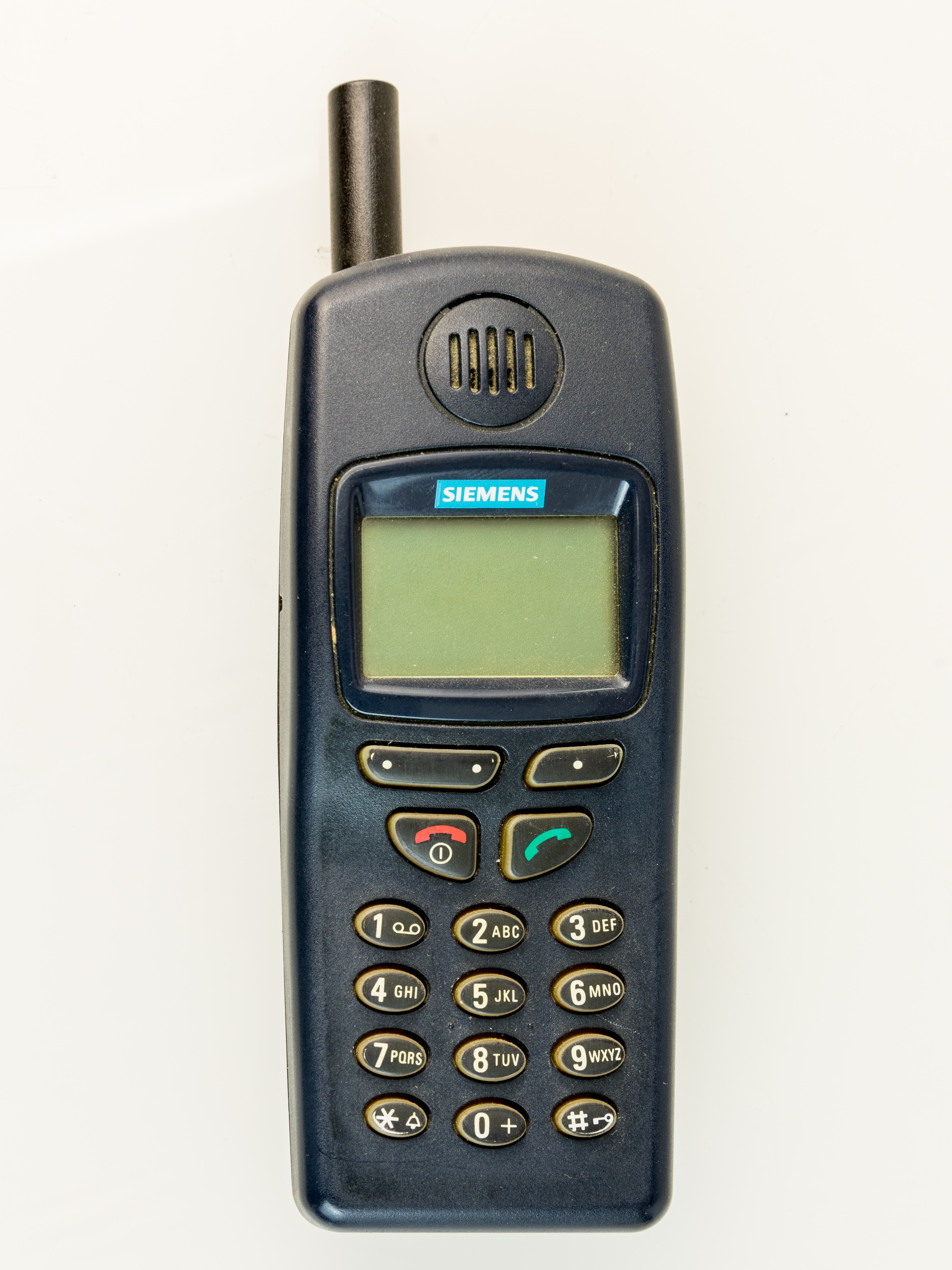
- Manufacturer: Siemens
- Availability by region: 1999
- Compatible networks: GSM dual band
- Form factor: Candybar
- Dimensions: 116×46×28 mm (4.6×1.8×1.1 in)
- Weight: 135 g (including battery)
- Battery: 650 mAh NiMH
- Display: 3 × 12 alphanumeric chars
- Data inputs: Keypad

The Siemens C25 is a mobile phone introduced by Siemens in 1999.Siemens C 25 is positioned as an entry-level model. It is a small, lightweight, handy device. This model was available in only 5 colors (Classic Green, Classic Blue, Anthracite, Bright Blue or Bright Yellow). But it was possible to buy a removable front panel.

There is a function to write your own ringtone. There are several programs for writing melodies. For example, the MIDI-2-C25 allows you to convert MIDI standard music files into a Siemens C25 sheet of notes.

It weighs 135 g and its dimensions are 117 × 47 × 27 mm (length (without the antenna) × width × depth). Its display is a 3 × 12-character monochrome LCD. Display backlight color is green.

The phone's battery powers the phone for 300 minutes talk time, or up to 160 hours if left in stand-by mode. The Ni MH battery is used as standard. It is a dual-band mobile phone, supporting both GSM 900 and GSM 1800 network frequencies. It supports up to 21 monophonic ringtones. It also supports SMS sending and receiving.

== Reviews ==
Despite usability flaws, Mobile Review found it "a beautiful phone to hold and use". Mobiles magazine scored it 88/100, despite also criticising certain omissions.
