= Siemens S40 =

Cell phone model

The Siemens S40 is a mobile phone. Originally developed as the Bosch 1886 in 2000, the phone was branded as the Siemens S40 after Siemens acquired the Bosch mobile phone division. The Siemens S40 is a tri-band mobile phone that operates on the GSM-900, GSM-1800, and GSM-1900 networks. Communication with a computer can be done either through the infrared port (IrDA) on the phone or a USB or serial port data cable. Its more distinctive features include the voice memo recorder, the mute feature for conversations, the ability to record phone conversations, and the ringtone composer (a useful alternative for those unsatisfied with the 47 monophonic ringtones).

In 2005, the phone made it onto CNET's list of ten lowest-radiation cell phones, at #10, with a SAR (specific absorption rate) of 0.33.

The phone also supports WAP 1.1, SMS, HSCSD, and T9 predictive text input.

The S40 includes a 104x64 pixel monochrome liquid-crystal display with a blue backlight, an internal antenna, and rubbery buttons to prevent accidental dialing.

== Siemens S42 ==
Phone was also branded as the Siemens S42, with the only differences being the keypad cover and a more rounded form factor.
