= Siemens S45 =

Cell phone model

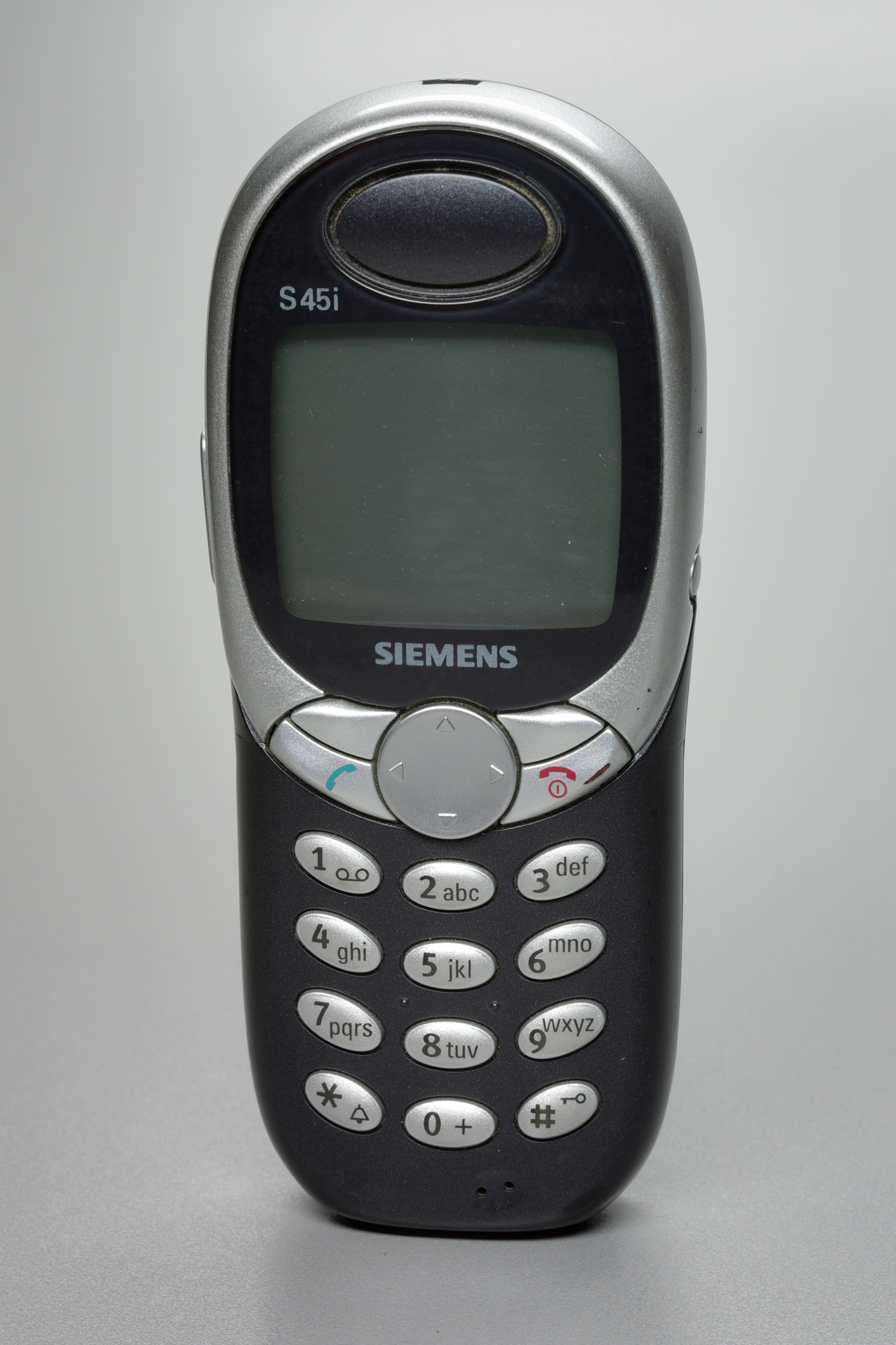
Siemens S45i BW

Announced in 2001, the Siemens S45 was Siemens' first ever GPRS mobile phone, allowing for faster data transmission and Internet access with the coupled dual-band GSM-900 and GSM-1800 networks.

The phone came with 360 KB of internal memory, which was considered generous at the time. This storage space was marketed as flexible because it could be manipulated like a hard disk via a supplied phone-to-serial cable, and the included software ensured that files could be transferred from the computer desktop to the phone in the drag-and-drop manner.

Later, Siemens released the S45i, with added E-mail client.

== Features ==
Specific absorption rate (SAR) = 0,95 W/kg
