= Siemens S55 =

Cell phone model by Siemens

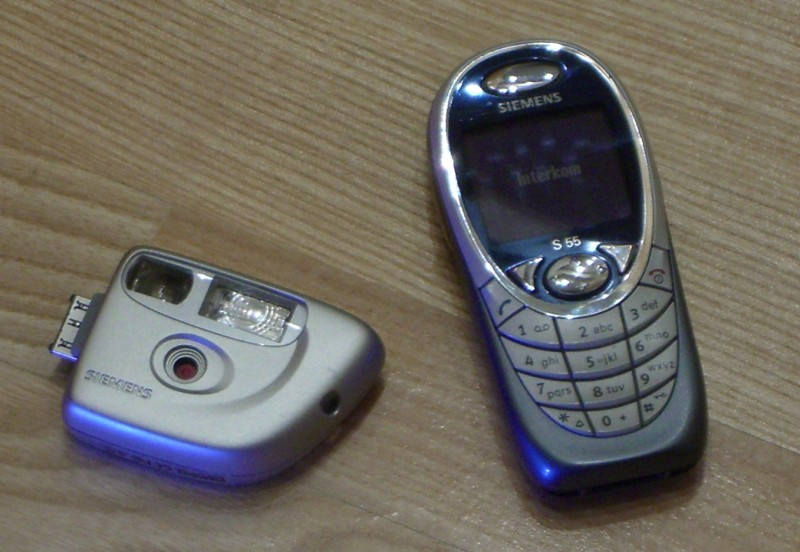
- Dimensions: 101×42×18 mm (3.98×1.65×0.71 in) = 69 cm^{3}
- Weight: 85 g (3 oz)
- Memory: 1 MB
- Display: 256 colors (8 bit), 101 x 80 px
- Connectivity: IrDA, Bluetooth

The Siemens S55 was a mobile phone which was introduced by Siemens in late 2002. At the time it was a high end phone and one of the first colour phones by Siemens, with a 256 colour screen, Bluetooth and infrared, and a competitor to the Ericsson T68.

It was superseded by phones with screens with more colours and pixels, such as 4096, then 65K colour screens.

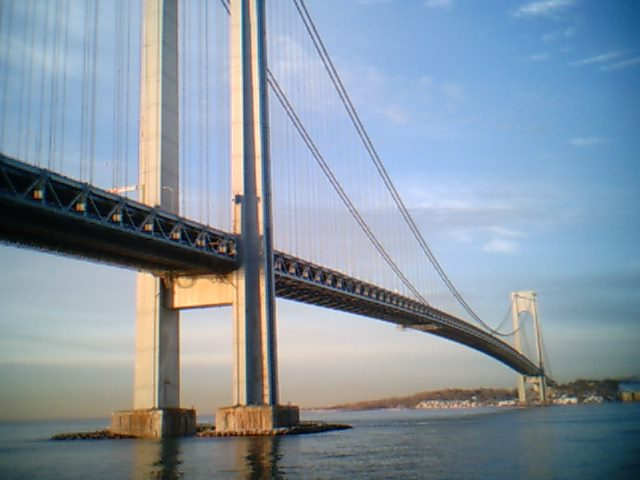
Picture of Verrazano Bridge taken with an S55

The S55 had features unique at that time for a phone of its size, including:

- optional 640x480 pixel clip-on camera with flash
- MMS
- Internet surfing
- Java
- Bluetooth
- Games in colour
- Audio recording
- Advanced calendar
- GSM Tri-band 900/1800/1900 MHz
