= Mount Baldy =

Mount Baldy may refer to:

Mountains:

- Mount Baldy (Arizona)
- Mount San Antonio, California, usually referred to as Mount Baldy
- Mount Baldy (Nevada)
- Mount Baldy (Polk County, Oregon)
- Mount Baldy, Mineral County, Montana
- Mount Baldy (Beaver County, Utah)
- Mount Baldy (Salt Lake County, Utah)
- Mount Baldy (Alberta)
- Mount Baldy, British Columbia, Canada - see Mount Baldy Ski Area
- Baldy Mountain (Colfax County, New Mexico)
- A nickname for Mont Ventoux in France

Sand dunes:

- Mount Baldhead in Saugatuck, Michigan
- Mount Baldy (Indiana), the tallest sand dune on the southern shore of Lake Michigan

Other uses:

- Mount Baldy, California, small mountain community in San Bernardino county on the slopes of Mount San Antonio (Mount Baldy), sometimes called Mount Baldy Village

== See also ==
- Mount Baldy Ski Lifts, a ski resort on Mount San Antonio in Los Angeles County, California
- Mount Baldy Zen Center
- South Baldy (New Mexico), the high point of the Magdalena Mountains
- List of peaks named Baldy (disambiguation)
