= List of peaks named Baldy =

There are a number of peaks named Baldy, primarily in the English-speaking countries of Canada and the United States. The popularity of the name Baldy, at least for higher peaks, may be related to the tree line, an elevation beyond which trees cannot tolerate the environmental conditions. The absence of trees past the tree line may give a mountain a bald or baren appearance, hence the name Baldy.

== Canada ==
- Baldy Mountain (Manitoba), 2,730 feet (830 m), 51.46996°N 100.71987°W
- Big Baldy Mountain (Vancouver Island, British Columbia), 5,308 feet (1,618 m)49°45′38.2″N 126°08′01.0″W

== United States ==
=== Peaks named "Baldy" ===
Name	USGS link	State	County	USGS map	Coordinates	Elevation	
Baldy		California	Siskiyou	Sheep Mountain	41°49′27″N 121°53′31″W	5,564 ft	1,696 m
Baldy		Colorado	Gunnison	Alpine Plateau	38°14′52″N 107°20′54″W	11,112 ft	3,387 m
Baldy		Colorado	Las Animas	Fishers Peak	37°02′35″N 104°28′58″W	8,025 ft	2,446 m
Baldy		California	Ventura	Piru	34°27′13″N 118°47′59″W	3,376 ft	1,029 m
Baldy		Idaho	Lemhi	Leesburg	45°08′40″N 114°00′31″W	9,121 ft	2,780 m
Baldy		Maine	Aroostook	Saint Croix Lake	46°17′09″N 068°09′54″W	994 ft	303 m
Baldy		Michigan	Allegan	Saugatuck	42°44′37″N 086°12′12″W	764 ft	233 m
Baldy		Michigan	Missaukee	Stittsville	44°29′45″N 085°02′02″W	1,401 ft	427 m
Baldy		Montana	Missoula	Bata Mountain	46°57′24″N 113°20′09″W	5,085 ft	1,550 m
Baldy		Montana	Cascade	The Sawteeth	47°01′13″N 111°47′03″W	5,617 ft	1,712 m
Baldy		Montana	Powell	Mount Powell	46°19′06″N 112°59′25″W	8,937 ft	2,724 m
Baldy		New Mexico	Torrance	Chilili	34°58′04″N 106°09′11″W	6,716 ft	2,047 m
Baldy		New York	Sullivan	Jeffersonville	41°45′57″N 074°57′45″W	1,522 ft	464 m
Baldy		Oregon	Jackson	Siskiyou Pass	42°05′47″N 122°30′08″W	4,852 ft	1,479 m
Baldy		Oregon	Jackson	Rio Canyon	42°17′54″N 122°45′04″W	3,779 ft	1,152 m
Baldy		Oregon	Wheeler	Richmond	44°39′25″N 119°58′17″W	5,882 ft	1,793 m
Baldy		Oregon	Lincoln	Harlan	44°33′52″N 123°42′13″W	1,197 ft	365 m
Baldy		Oregon	Union	Glass Hill	45°09′48″N 118°00′54″W	4,911 ft	1,497 m
Baldy		Utah	Millard	Notch Peak	39°11′32″N 113°24′34″W	8,389 ft	2,557 m
Baldy		Washington	Kittitas	Wymer	46°47′56″N 120°25′38″W	3,212 ft	979 m
Baldy		Washington	Stevens	Gillette Mountain	48°42′46″N 117°51′38″W	4,452 ft	1,357 m
Baldy		Washington	Clallam	Tyler Peak	47°53′42″N 123°11′21″W	6,808 ft	2,075 m
Baldy		Wyoming	Platte	Cassa	42°28′10″N 104°52′35″W	5,259 ft	1,603 m

=== Peaks named "Baldy Mountain" ===
Name	USGS link	State	County	USGS map	Coordinates	Elevation	
Baldy Mountain		Alaska	Nome (CA)	Bendeleben C-6	65°33′05″N 164°33′44″W	1,604 ft	489 m
Baldy Mountain		Arizona	Maricopa	Baldy Mountain	33°52′21″N 112°20′29″W	2,759 ft	841 m
Baldy Mountain		Arizona	Greenlee	Harden Cienega	33°09′34″N 109°04′36″W	6,404 ft	1,952 m
Baldy Mountain		Colorado	Rio Blanco	Sleepy Cat Peak	40°10′03″N 107°32′07″W	9,737 ft	2,968 m
Baldy Mountain		Colorado	Rio Blanco	Devils Causeway	40°07′25″N 107°12′24″W	9,564 ft	2,915 m
Baldy Mountain		Colorado	Pitkin	Highland Peak	39°08′53″N 106°57′59″W	13,113 ft	3,997 m
Baldy Mountain		Colorado	La Plata	Durango East	37°21′49″N 107°46′59″W	9,859 ft	3,005 m
Baldy Mountain		Colorado	Archuleta	Baldy Mountain	37°20′58″N 107°25′12″W	10,131 ft	3,088 m
Baldy Mountain		Colorado	Mineral	Workman Creek	37°41′19″N 107°06′42″W	12,490 ft	3,810 m
Baldy Mountain		Colorado	Gunnison	Matchless Mountain	38°47′28″N 106°39′21″W	11,630 ft	3,540 m
Baldy Mountain		Colorado	Park	Thirtyone Mile Mountain	38°43′01″N 105°35′37″W	9,711 ft	2,960 m
Baldy Mountain		Colorado	Fremont	Royal Gorge	38°26′43″N 105°18′42″W	6,818 ft	2,078 m
Baldy Mountain		Colorado	Mesa	Quaker Mesa	39°18′30″N 107°29′59″W	10,216 ft	3,114 m
Baldy Mountain		California	Napa	Chiles Valley	38°33′06″N 122°19′34″W	2,054 ft	626 m
Baldy Mountain		California	Lake	Wilson Valley	38°55′45″N 122°24′04″W	2,201 ft	671 m
Baldy Mountain		California	Lake	Leesville	39°08′32″N 122°29′57″W	3,363 ft	1,025 m
Baldy Mountain		California	Siskiyou	Happy Camp	41°48′00″N 123°29′38″W	5,590 ft	1,700 m
Baldy Mountain		Idaho	Bannock	Sedgwick Peak	42°32′45″N 111°56′45″W	8,333 ft	2,540 m
Baldy Mountain		Idaho	Bonneville	Thompson Peak	43°26′02″N 111°12′46″W	8,966 ft	2,733 m
Baldy Mountain		Idaho	Clark	Slide Mountain	44°34′05″N 111°52′15″W	9,869 ft	3,008 m
Baldy Mountain		Idaho	Idaho	Pilot Knob	45°57′20″N 115°43′57″W	6,611 ft	2,015 m
Baldy Mountain		Idaho	Lemhi	Morrison Lake	44°35′59″N 113°05′18″W	10,761 ft	3,280 m
Baldy Mountain		Massachusetts	Berkshire	East Lee	42°15′05″N 073°10′48″W	1,873 ft	571 m
Baldy Mountain		Montana	Beaverhead	Polaris	45°21′21″N 113°01′34″W	10,535 ft	3,211 m
Baldy Mountain		Montana	Gallatin	Saddle Peak	45°46′03″N 110°56′38″W	8,829 ft	2,691 m
Baldy Mountain		Montana	Missoula	Davis Point	46°42′27″N 113°58′53″W	5,978 ft	1,822 m
Baldy Mountain		Montana	Sanders	Baldy Lake	47°37′18″N 114°49′29″W	7,461 ft	2,274 m
Baldy Mountain		Montana	Flathead	Lion Mountain	48°01′30″N 114°17′18″W	4,954 ft	1,510 m
Baldy Mountain		Montana	Hill	Bowery Peak	48°08′55″N 109°39′03″W	6,900 ft	2,100 m
Baldy Mountain		Montana	Lewis and Clark	Lincoln	46°54′16″N 112°37′58″W	6,371 ft	1,942 m
Baldy Mountain		Montana	Lewis and Clark	Silver City	46°49′51″N 112°07′39″W	6,129 ft	1,868 m
Baldy Mountain		Montana	Madison	Cirque Lake	45°11′23″N 111°57′42″W	9,616 ft	2,931 m
Baldy Mountain		Nevada	Lincoln	Caliente	37°30′54″N 114°35′50″W	5,620 ft	1,710 m
Baldy Mountain		New Mexico	Mora	Maxson Crater	35°54′19″N 104°53′35″W	7,408 ft	2,258 m
Baldy Mountain		New Mexico	De Baca	Conejo Creek East	34°09′42″N 104°16′06″W	4,075 ft	1,242 m
Baldy Mountain		New Mexico	Colfax	Baldy Mountain	36°37′45″N 105°12′50″W	12,441 ft	3,792 m
Baldy Mountain		New Mexico	Taos	Latir Peak	36°47′08″N 105°26′24″W	12,047 ft	3,672 m
Baldy Mountain		New York	Franklin	Brainardsville	44°47′19″N 074°04′58″W	2,136 ft	651 m
Baldy Mountain		Oregon	Malheur	Wendt Butte	44°26′33″N 117°51′01″W	5,410 ft	1,650 m
Baldy Mountain		Oregon	Jackson	Mount Isabelle	42°18′48″N 123°04′04″W	3,976 ft	1,212 m
Baldy Mountain		Oregon	Baker	Durkee	44°30′40″N 117°28′58″W	5,463 ft	1,665 m
Baldy Mountain		Oregon	Douglas	Baldy Mountain	43°54′50″N 123°48′21″W	2,513 ft	766 m
Baldy Mountain		Oregon	Grant	Pine Creek Mountain	44°20′28″N 118°47′54″W	7,352 ft	2,241 m
Baldy Mountain		Oregon	Grant	Deardorff Mountain	44°23′36″N 118°26′47″W	7,579 ft	2,310 m
Baldy Mountain		Texas	Jeff Davis	El Muerto Peak	30°41′33″N 104°21′20″W	5,768 ft	1,758 m
Baldy Mountain		Texas	Comal	Devils Backbone	29°53′28″N 098°11′59″W	1,132 ft	345 m
Baldy Mountain		Utah	Wasatch	Strawberry Reservoir SW	40°03′04″N 111°12′14″W	9,429 ft	2,874 m
Baldy Mountain		Washington	Cowlitz	Woolford Creek	46°05′32″N 122°41′53″W	2,480 ft	760 m
Baldy Mountain		Washington	Pend Oreille	Deep Lake	48°49′23″N 117°30′41″W	5,889 ft	1,795 m
Baldy Mountain		Washington	Chelan	Baldy Mountain	47°51′50″N 120°19′41″W	6,279 ft	1,914 m
Baldy Mountain		Washington	Chelan	Prince Creek	48°14′20″N 120°27′24″W	7,733 ft	2,357 m
Baldy Mountain		Wisconsin	Chippewa	Bob Lake	45°12′18″N 091°16′24″W	1,384 ft	422 m
Baldy Mountain		Wyoming	Albany	Baldy Mountain	41°32′43″N 105°29′28″W	8,589 ft	2,618 m
Baldy Mountain		Wyoming	Platte	Cassa	42°24′55″N 104°54′05″W	5,210 ft	1,590 m
Baldy Mountain		Wyoming	Teton	Rosies Ridge	43°47′17″N 110°19′17″W	8,524 ft	2,598 m
Baldy Mountain		California	Riverside	Idyllwild	33°41′09″N 116°42′57″W	5,568 ft	1,697 m

=== Peaks named "Baldy Peak" ===
Name	USGS link	State	County	USGS map	Coordinates	Elevation	
Baldy Peak		Arizona	Pima	Penitas Hills	31°50′46″N 111°20′06″W	4,052 ft	1,235 m
Baldy Peak		Arizona	Apache	Mount Baldy	33°54′22″N 109°33′46″W	11,391 ft	3,472 m
Baldy Peak		Colorado	Routt	Quaker Mountain	40°44′15″N 107°14′47″W	8,999 ft	2,743 m
Baldy Peak		Colorado	La Plata	Hesperus	37°20′58″N 108°02′14″W	10,850 ft	3,310 m
Baldy Peak		Colorado	Ouray	Ouray	38°06′37″N 107°40′52″W	10,574 ft	3,223 m
Baldy Peak		Colorado	Jefferson	Green Mountain	39°22′28″N 105°18′31″W	7,835 ft	2,388 m
Baldy Peak		Colorado	Custer	Electric Peak	38°14′59″N 105°44′19″W	12,795 ft	3,900 m
Baldy Peak		California	Del Norte	Prescott Mountain	41°40′24″N 123°43′11″W	5,732 ft	1,747 m
Baldy Peak		Montana	Powder River	Baldy Peak	45°12′36″N 105°31′33″W	4,242 ft	1,293 m
Baldy Peak		Montana	Custer	Buck Mountain	46°26′06″N 105°25′52″W	3,222 ft	982 m
Baldy Peak		Nevada	White Pine	Baldy Peak	39°57′51″N 114°23′48″W	9,370 ft	2,860 m
Baldy Peak		New Mexico	Doña Ana	Organ Peak	32°19′18″N 106°33′37″W	8,412 ft	2,564 m
Baldy Peak		New Mexico	Luna	Gym Peak	32°05′20″N 107°37′26″W	6,959 ft	2,121 m
Baldy Peak		Oregon	Jackson	Squaw Lakes	42°05′36″N 123°02′32″W	4,623 ft	1,409 m
Baldy Peak		South Dakota	Lawrence	Saint Onge	44°33′26″N 103°39′03″W	3,612 ft	1,101 m
Baldy Peak		Texas	Jeff Davis	Mount Livermore	30°38′08″N 104°10′24″W	8,323 ft	2,537 m
Baldy Peak		Utah	Rich	Dairy Ridge	41°24′20″N 111°27′07″W	8,651 ft	2,637 m
Baldy Peak		Washington	Klickitat	Northwestern Lake	45°49′50″N 121°31′54″W	2,539 ft	774 m
Baldy Peak		Wyoming	Converse	Saddleback Mountain	42°26′33″N 105°31′47″W	7,405 ft	2,257 m

=== Peaks named "Big Baldy" or "Little Baldy" ===
Name	USGS link	State	County	USGS map	Coordinates	Elevation	
Big Baldy		Colorado	Fremont	High Park	38°39′00″N 105°19′30″W	8,904 ft	2,714 m
Big Baldy		Colorado	San Miguel	Beaver Park	37°59′52″N 108°13′20″W	9,190 ft	2,800 m
Big Baldy		California	San Luis Obispo	Tar Spring Ridge	35°13′43″N 120°23′54″W	2,664 ft	812 m
Big Baldy		Idaho	Valley	Big Baldy	44°46′58″N 115°13′08″W	9,682 ft	2,951 m
Big Baldy		Oregon	Lake	Big Baldy	42°22′00″N 120°27′37″W	6,978 ft	2,127 m
Big Baldy		Oregon	Douglas	Winston	43°00′10″N 123°26′13″W	3,127 ft	953 m
Big Baldy		Oregon	Lane	Harness Mountain	43°33′13″N 123°05′26″W	1,562 ft	476 m
Big Baldy		Oregon	Grant	Graylock Butte	44°09′59″N 119°28′52″W	5,574 ft	1,699 m
Big Baldy		Utah	Juab	Chriss Canyon	39°23′28″N 111°45′06″W	8,770 ft	2,670 m
Big Baldy		Utah	Utah	Orem	40°21′59″N 111°39′55″W	8,750 ft	2,670 m
Big Baldy		Utah	Cache	Logan	41°40′28″N 111°45′09″W	8,858 ft	2,700 m
Big Baldy		California	Tulare	General Grant Grove	36°40′19″N 118°52′53″W	8,035 ft	2,449 m
Big Baldy Mountain		Colorado	Fremont	Salida East	38°33′31″N 105°54′37″W	9,472 ft	2,887 m
Big Baldy Mountain		Montana	Judith Basin	Yogo Peak	46°58′07″N 110°36′23″W	9,183 ft	2,799 m
Big Baldy Peak		Texas	Pecos	Skyscraper Peak	30°49′31″N 102°27′20″W	2,881 ft	878 m
Little Baldy		Colorado	Mesa	Durango East	37°19′16″N 107°46′06″W	7,277 ft	2,218 m
Little Baldy		Colorado	San Miguel	Gurley Canyon	38°01′34″N 108°14′15″W	8,494 ft	2,589 m
Little Baldy		Colorado	Gunnison	Whitepine	38°34′53″N 106°28′51″W	11,345 ft	3,458 m
Little Baldy		California	Mendocino	Mina	39°54′52″N 123°20′42″W	2,992 ft	912 m
Little Baldy		California	Tulare	Giant Forest	36°36′52″N 118°48′16″W	8,048 ft	2,453 m
Little Baldy		California	Mendocino	Plaskett Ridge	39°37′54″N 122°57′37″W	6,211 ft	1,893 m
Little Baldy		California	Mendocino	Mendocino Pass	39°50′59″N 122°59′21″W	5,938 ft	1,810 m
Little Baldy		California	Mendocino	Bluenose Ridge	39°55′35″N 123°12′22″W	3,645 ft	1,111 m
Little Baldy		California	Modoc	Davis Creek	41°38′30″N 120°16′05″W	7,392 ft	2,253 m
Little Baldy		California	Siskiyou	Horse Creek	41°47′05″N 122°58′21″W	4,833 ft	1,473 m
Little Baldy		Idaho	Shoshone	Murray	47°41′36″N 115°50′27″W	5,548 ft	1,691 m
Little Baldy		Idaho	Valley	Pistol Lake	44°41′22″N 115°25′57″W	8,583 ft	2,616 m
Little Baldy		Idaho	Idaho	Pilot Knob	45°56′12″N 115°41′00″W	5,371 ft	1,637 m
Little Baldy		Montana	Powell	Bailey Mountain	46°42′11″N 112°53′00″W	7,008 ft	2,136 m
Little Baldy		Oklahoma	Comanche	Quanah Mountain	34°42′43″N 098°38′49″W	1,634 ft	498 m
Little Baldy		Oregon	Lake	Big Baldy	42°20′39″N 120°26′33″W	6,480 ft	1,980 m
Little Baldy		Oregon	Lane	Harness Mountain	43°33′30″N 123°04′46″W	2,028 ft	618 m
Little Baldy		Oregon	Jackson	Lakecreek	42°27′43″N 122°36′09″W	2,310 ft	700 m
Little Baldy		Oregon	Grant	Suplee Butte	44°09′13″N 119°31′51″W	5,079 ft	1,548 m
Little Baldy		Tennessee	Polk	Isabella	35°01′47″N 084°19′40″W	2,162 ft	659 m
Little Baldy		Utah	Utah	Orem	40°21′28″N 111°39′04″W	7,671 ft	2,338 m
Little Baldy		Utah	Cache	Logan	41°42′32″N 111°45′02″W	8,763 ft	2,671 m
Little Baldy		Washington	Spokane	Spokane NE	47°42′27″N 117°19′50″W	2,661 ft	811 m
Little Baldy		Washington	Clark	Lacamas Creek	45°40′46″N 122°24′01″W	1,434 ft	437 m
Little Baldy		Washington	Skamania	Bobs Mountain	45°44′47″N 122°12′15″W	3,819 ft	1,164 m
Little Baldy Mountain		Colorado	Garfield	Center Mountain	39°25′03″N 107°27′44″W	9,619 ft	2,932 m
Little Baldy Mountain		Colorado	Park	Como	39°19′43″N 105°56′53″W	12,149 ft	3,703 m
Little Baldy Mountain		Colorado	Fremont	Jack Hall Mountain	38°35′32″N 105°51′32″W	9,383 ft	2,860 m
Little Baldy Mountain		Colorado	Custer	Horn Peak	38°00′12″N 105°35′07″W	12,943 ft	3,945 m
Little Baldy Mountain		California	Lassen	Day	41°09′22″N 121°18′54″W	5,794 ft	1,766 m
Little Baldy Mountain		Idaho	Bonneville	Thompson Peak	43°25′26″N 111°13′04″W	8,113 ft	2,473 m
Little Baldy Mountain		Oregon	Baker	Little Baldy Mountain	44°20′05″N 118°28′08″W	7,680 ft	2,340 m
Little Baldy Mountain		Utah	Wasatch	Strawberry Reservoir SW	40°02′31″N 111°11′54″W	9,209 ft	2,807 m
Little Baldy Peak		Washington	Skamania	Northwestern Lake	45°48′09″N 121°37′21″W	2,805 ft	855 m

=== Peaks named "Mount Baldy" ===
Name	USGS link	State	County	USGS map	Coordinates	Elevation	
Mount Baldy		Arizona	Apache	Mount Baldy	33°54′22″N 109°33′46″W	11,391 ft	3,472 m
Mount Baldy		California	Humboldt	Bridgeville	40°22′55″N 123°52′16″W	3,012 ft	918 m
Mount Baldy		California	Los Angeles	Mount San Antonio	34°17′20″N 117°38′48″W	10,066 ft	3,068 m
Mount Baldy		Colorado	Gunnison	Oh-be-joyful	38°59′37″N 107°02′46″W	12,789 ft	3,898 m
Mount Baldy		Indiana	LaPorte	Michigan City West	41°42′40″N 086°55′30″W	607 ft	185 m
Mount Baldy		Idaho	Bonneville	Point Lookout	43°26′21″N 111°34′28″W	7,362 ft	2,244 m
Mount Baldy		Montana	Broadwater	Mount Edith	46°26′25″N 111°14′51″W	9,442 ft	2,878 m
Mount Baldy		Montana	Granite	Medicine Tree Hill	46°44′17″N 113°25′13″W	6,926 ft	2,111 m
Mount Baldy		Montana	Mineral	Wilson Gulch	47°10′01″N 115°02′04″W	6,903 ft	2,104 m
Mount Baldy		Montana	Glacier	Hyde Creek	48°19′07″N 113°09′14″W	7,690 ft	2,340 m
Mount Baldy		Montana	Lincoln	Mount Baldy	48°50′04″N 115°55′32″W	6,509 ft	1,984 m
Mount Baldy		Montana	Gallatin	Kelly Creek	45°44′00″N 110°57′33″W	7,106 ft	2,166 m
Mount Baldy		Nevada	Humboldt	Howard Hot Spring	41°39′24″N 118°36′59″W	6,378 ft	1,944 m
Mount Baldy		Nevada	Washoe	Mount Rose	39°16′43″N 120°00′01″W	9,272 ft	2,826 m
Mount Baldy		New Mexico	Hidalgo	Mount Baldy	31°41′13″N 108°55′45″W	6,555 ft	1,998 m
Mount Baldy		New Mexico	Sierra	Tip Top Canyon	33°14′54″N 106°36′35″W	7,372 ft	2,247 m
Mount Baldy		New York	Chautauqua	Westfield	42°17′02″N 079°33′54″W	1,355 ft	413 m
Mount Baldy		Oregon	Jackson	Ruch	42°11′39″N 123°06′46″W	4,629 ft	1,411 m
Mount Baldy		Oregon	Polk	Dallas	44°57′47″N 123°15′42″W	410 ft	120 m
Mount Baldy		Utah	Utah	Dromedary Peak	40°34′04″N 111°38′17″W	11,056 ft	3,370 m
Mount Baldy		Utah	Washington	New Harmony	37°25′53″N 113°20′11″W	8,891 ft	2,710 m
Mount Baldy		Utah	Beaver	Mount Belknap	38°24′07″N 112°26′11″W	12,090 ft	3,690 m
Mount Baldy		Utah	Sanpete	Spencer Canyon	39°45′37″N 111°34′40″W	9,048 ft	2,758 m
Mount Baldy		Utah	Sanpete	Black Mountain	39°07′32″N 111°30′37″W	10,919 ft	3,328 m
Mount Baldy		Washington	Kittitas	Kachess Lake	47°16′13″N 121°08′06″W	5,007 ft	1,526 m
Mount Baldy		Washington	Clallam	Lake Sutherland	48°02′55″N 123°38′37″W	4,642 ft	1,415 m
Mount Baldy		Wyoming	Fremont	Washakie Park	42°55′50″N 109°13′56″W	12,077 ft	3,681 m
Mount Baldy		Wyoming	Sublette	Horseshoe Lake	42°59′58″N 109°35′23″W	11,739 ft	3,578 m

=== Peaks named "Old Baldy" ===
Name	USGS link	State	County	USGS map	Coordinates	Elevation	
Old Baldy		Arizona	Gila	El Capitan Mountain	33°13′37″N 110°47′56″W	5,495 ft	1,675 m
Old Baldy		Arizona	Santa Cruz	Mount Wrightson	31°42′00″N 110°51′02″W	8,087 ft	2,465 m
Old Baldy		California	Napa	Calistoga	38°36′47″N 122°30′16″W	2,743 ft	836 m
Old Baldy		Colorado	Rio Blanco	Devils Hole Gulch	40°11′16″N 107°58′12″W	8,051 ft	2,454 m
Old Baldy		Colorado	Rio Blanco	Fawn Creek	40°01′14″N 107°31′49″W	8,510 ft	2,590 m
Old Baldy		Colorado	Grand	Ute Peak	39°45′32″N 106°01′09″W	11,840 ft	3,610 m
Old Baldy		Colorado	Yuma	Old Baldy	40°20′26″N 102°27′38″W	4,078 ft	1,243 m
Old Baldy		Michigan	Antrim	Central Lake	45°00′18″N 085°19′38″W	728 ft	222 m
Old Baldy		Montana	Fergus	Half Moon Canyon	46°45′08″N 109°18′50″W	8,684 ft	2,647 m
Old Baldy		Montana	Meagher	Bald Hills	46°59′55″N 111°12′39″W	6,798 ft	2,072 m
Old Baldy		Montana	Teton	Our Lake	47°51′13″N 112°49′22″W	9,085 ft	2,769 m
Old Baldy		Nebraska	Dundy	Champion SW	40°20′46″N 101°44′40″W	3,366 ft	1,026 m
Old Baldy		Nebraska	Garden	Old Baldy	41°28′14″N 102°01′14″W	3,871 ft	1,180 m
Old Baldy		Nebraska	Boyd	Marty	42°56′13″N 098°28′40″W	1,585 ft	483 m
Old Baldy		New Mexico	Luna	Hat Top Mountain	31°57′25″N 108°08′25″W	5,469 ft	1,667 m
Old Baldy		New Mexico	Lea	Custer Mountain	32°08′51″N 103°17′28″W	3,241 ft	988 m
Old Baldy		New York	Cattaraugus	Olean	42°03′25″N 078°24′57″W	2,018 ft	615 m
Old Baldy		North Dakota	Cavalier	Vang	48°55′34″N 098°04′02″W	1,171 ft	357 m
Old Baldy		Oregon	Jackson	Rogue River	42°29′26″N 123°13′51″W	3,947 ft	1,203 m
Old Baldy		Oregon	Jackson	Little Chinquapin Mountain	42°14′51″N 122°17′18″W	6,332 ft	1,930 m
Old Baldy		Oregon	Clackamas	Wildcat Mountain	45°16′22″N 122°04′57″W	4,180 ft	1,270 m
Old Baldy		Texas	Hays	Driftwood	30°00′35″N 098°06′58″W	1,178 ft	359 m
Old Baldy		Texas	Culberson	Seven Heart Gap	31°15′22″N 104°33′23″W	4,993 ft	1,522 m
Old Baldy		Utah	Utah	Tintic Junction	39°59′20″N 112°07′42″W	7,306 ft	2,227 m
Old Baldy		Washington	Stevens	Old Baldy Mountain	45°33′52″N 112°08′56″W	9,875 ft	3,010 m
Old Baldy Mountain		Montana	Lewis and Clark	Three Brothers	46°24′55″N 112°16′11″W	8,195 ft	2,498 m
Old Baldy Mountain		Montana	Powell	Windy Rock	46°42′37″N 112°52′21″W	7,438 ft	2,267 m
Old Baldy Mountain		South Dakota	Pennington	Mount Rushmore	43°53′27″N 103°27′30″W	5,587 ft	1,703 m
Old Baldy Mountain		South Dakota	Lawrence	Old Baldy Mountain	44°21′43″N 104°00′50″W	6,073 ft	1,851 m
Old Baldy Mountain		Vermont	Windsor	Woodstock South	43°34′01″N 072°36′03″W	2,405 ft	733 m
Old Baldy Mountain		Washington	Pierce	Old Baldy Mountain	47°01′02″N 121°53′23″W	5,777 ft	1,761 m
Old Baldy Mountain		Washington	Okanogan	Old Baldy, WA	48°35′23″N 119°57′22″W	7,854 ft	2,394 m
Old Baldy Peak		Idaho	Franklin	Clifton	42°08′57″N 112°04′36″W	8,363 ft	2,549 m
Old Baldy Peak		Idaho	Bonneville	Tincup Mountain	43°07′10″N 111°13′01″W	8,323 ft	2,537 m

=== Peaks with other variants of "Baldy" ===
Name	USGS link	State	County	USGS map	Coordinates	Elevation	
Colony Baldy		Colorado	Custer	Crestone Peak	37°59′44″N 105°33′37″W	13,705 ft	4,177 m
Lone Baldy		Alaska	Valdez-Cordova (CA)	Cordova A-2	60°13′05″N 144°34′49″W	866 ft	264 m
Middle Baldy		Colorado	Gunnison	West Elk Peak	38°41′18″N 107°11′42″W	12,703 ft	3,872 m
Middle Baldy		Colorado	Saguache	West Baldy	38°18′53″N 106°30′19″W	11,689 ft	3,563 m
Middle Baldy Mountain		Colorado	Gunnison	West Elk Peak	38°40′42″N 107°11′31″W	12,592 ft	3,838 m
North Baldy		Washington	Pend Oreille	North Baldy	48°32′45″N 117°09′19″W	6,135 ft	1,870 m
North Baldy Mountain		Colorado	Gunnison	West Elk Peak	38°42′01″N 107°11′15″W	12,851 ft	3,917 m
South Baldy		Colorado	Ouray	Mount Sneffels	38°04′44″N 107°49′59″W	9,819 ft	2,993 m
South Baldy		New Mexico	Socorro	South Baldy	33°59′27″N 107°11′15″W	10,758 ft	3,279 m
South Baldy		Oregon	Union	Little Catherine Creek	45°11′48″N 117°38′09″W	6,840 ft	2,080 m
South Baldy		Washington	Pend Oreille	Browns Lake	48°25′35″N 117°08′17″W	5,974 ft	1,821 m
South Baldy Mountain		Colorado	Gunnison	West Elk Peak	38°39′56″N 107°11′50″W	12,385 ft	3,775 m
South Baldy Mountain		Montana	Madison	Ramshorn Mountain	45°28′16″N 111°54′56″W	10,095 ft	3,077 m
West Baldy		Colorado	San Miguel	Sams	38°07′04″N 107°54′01″W	9,780 ft	2,980 m
West Baldy		Colorado	Saguache	West Baldy	38°17′55″N 106°33′03″W	11,450 ft	3,490 m
West Baldy		New Mexico	Catron	Grouse Mountain	33°15′31″N 108°42′42″W	9,774 ft	2,979 m
Baldy Alto		Colorado	Saguache	Stewart Peak	38°00′19″N 106°55′18″W	13,704 ft	4,177 m
Baldy Butte		Montana	Custer	Miller Creek SW	46°04′56″N 106°09′54″W	3,232 ft	985 m
Baldy Butte		Montana	Custer	Pennock Creek	46°14′31″N 105°09′55″W	3,205 ft	977 m
Baldy Butte		Montana	Garfield	Hell Hollow	47°33′38″N 107°07′47″W	2,910 ft	890 m
Baldy Butte		North Dakota	Slope	East Rainy Butte	46°29′04″N 102°59′27″W	3,156 ft	962 m
Baldy Butte		Oregon	Coos	Allegany	43°28′41″N 124°06′30″W	1,345 ft	410 m
Baldy Butte		Wyoming	Carbon	Doty Mountain	41°27′35″N 107°43′14″W	6,880 ft	2,100 m
Baldy Chato		Colorado	Saguache	Stewart Peak	38°02′20″N 106°56′32″W	13,396 ft	4,083 m
Baldy Cinco		Colorado	Hinsdale	Baldy Cinco	37°57′20″N 107°06′11″W	13,373 ft	4,076 m
Baldy Mesa		California	San Bernardino	Cajon	34°21′36″N 117°28′38″W	4,567 ft	1,392 m
