= Blue Angel =

Blue Angel may refer to:

== Music ==
- Blue Angel (band), which featured Cyndi Lauper as their lead vocalist, prior to her solo career
- Blue Angel (Blue Angel album), 1980
- Blue Angel (Patricia Conroy album), 1990
- Blue Angel (Park Ji-yoon album), 1998
- Blue Angel (Strawbs album), 2003

=== Songs ===
- "Blue Angel" (song), Roy Orbison, 1960
- "Blue Angel", a single by Gene Pitney written by Roger Cook, 1974 No.2 in Australia
- "Blue Angel", a song by Squirrel Nut Zippers from their 1996 album Hot
- "Blue Angel", a song by Dave Cousins from his 1972 album Two Weeks Last Summer
- "Blue Angel", a song by The Love Language from their 2010 album Libraries

== Films and television ==
- The Blue Angel, a 1930 movie starring Marlene Dietrich and Emil Jannings
- The Blue Angel (1959 film), a remake, starring May Britt and Curt Jurgens
- The Blue Angel, a 1954 American TV series

== Literature ==
- The Blue Angel (novel), a 1999 novel based on the science fiction TV series Doctor Who
- Blue Angel (novel), a 2000 novel by American author Francine Prose
- The Blue Angel, the English title of the novel Professor Unrat
- Blue Is the Warmest Color (comics), a 2010 graphic novel by French author Julie Maroh originally titled Blue Angel

== Other ==
- Blue Angel (train), a diesel railcar formerly used by the Netherlands Railways
- Blue Angel (certification), a German certification for environmentally friendly products and services
- Blue Angel (nightclub), a nightclub in Liverpool, England
- The Blue Angel (New York nightclub), a defunct nightclub in New York City
- Blue Angel, the act of fart lighting
- HTC Blue Angel, a mobile phone made by High Tech Computer Corporation
- The blue angel, Glaucus atlanticus, a species of sea slugs

== See also ==
- Blue Angels (disambiguation)
