= Siemens SXG75 =

Cell phone model

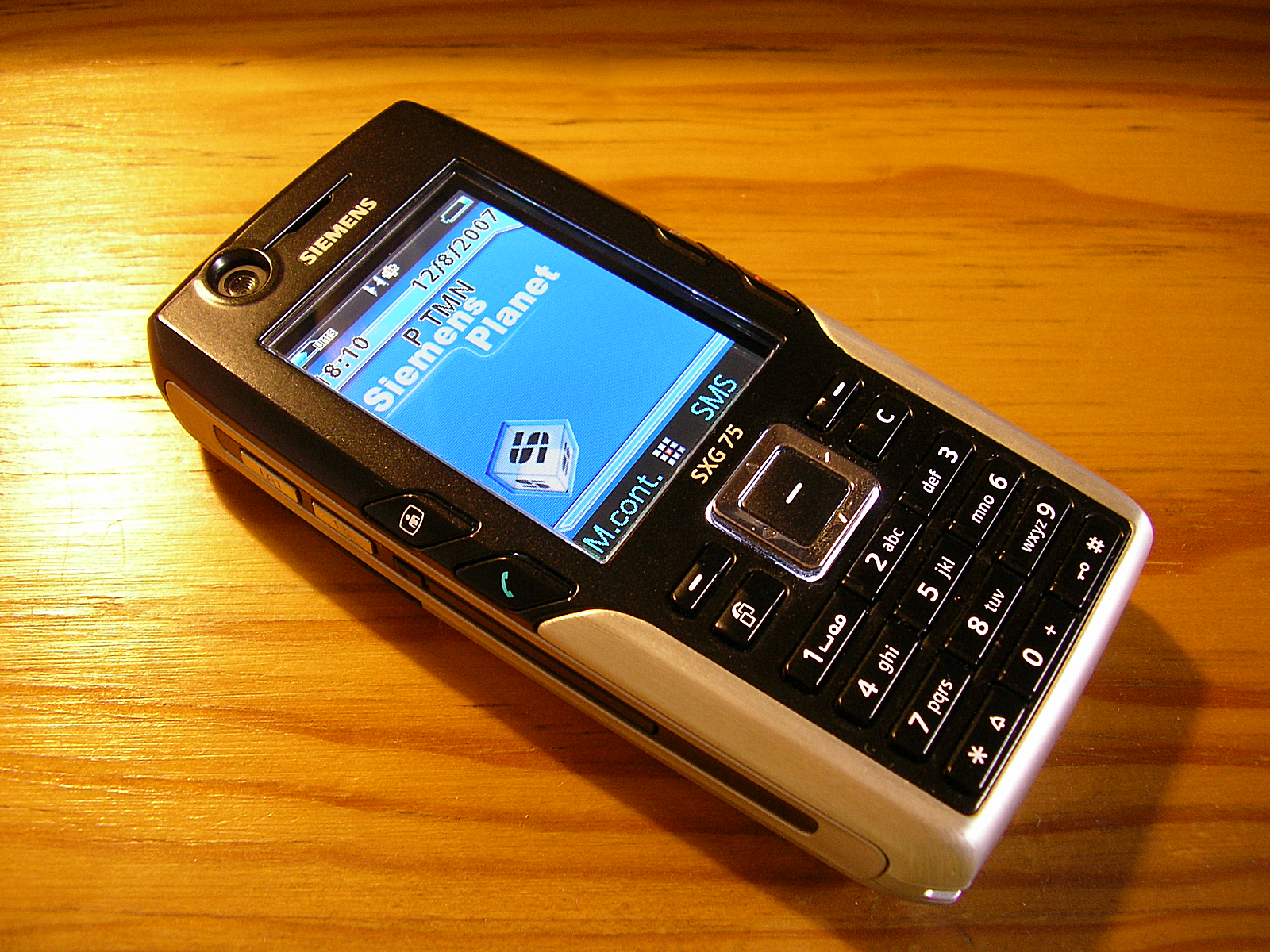
Metallic Black version

The Siemens SXG75 is a candybar-type UMTS triband mobile phone.

This is the first UMTS phone developed by Siemens; previous models (the U10 and the U15) were developed by Motorola. This is also the company's last such device, since the SG75 was cancelled and newer models carried the BenQ-Siemens brand name.

Besides UMTS, it differs from its predecessors in other features:

- Integrated GPS receiver;
- QVGA display (the SX45 was developed by Casio and the SX56 and SX66 were developed by HTC Corporation);
- Brew operating system, capable of multitasking;
- 2 megapixel camera.

The phone supports Internet access through GPRS and UMTS, but not EDGE.

== Technical data ==
Feature	Data
Networks	GSM Tri-band 900/1800/1900, W-CDMA 2100
Dimensions	111.5 mm × 53 mm × 20 mm
Weight	134 g
Display resolution	240 × 320 pixels (QVGA)
Display color depth	262.144 colours
Battery	Standby time: GSM: 325–400 h / UMTS: 375–400 h Talk time: GSM: 225–360 min / UMTS: 180–300 min
Memory	Internal: 128MB (72 MB available for the user), RS-MMC slot with hot swapping ability
Operating system	Siemens proprietary (user interface: BREW uiOne)
GPRS	Class 10 (2 Tx / 4 Rx)
Messaging	SMS with T9, MMS, E-mail, instant messaging
Interfaces	Bluetooth, IrDA, USB 1.1
Camera	Main: 2 megapixel, without autofocus or flash Videocall: CIF
Others	GPS receiver, music player, videocall, FM Radio with RDS, Microsoft Outlook synchronization, voice dialing
