= Cerro Pelado (disambiguation) =

Cerro Pelado may refer to:

Places

- Cerro Pelado (Rivera), Uruguay
- Cerro Pelado, Ngäbe-Buglé, Panama
- Cerro Pelado, Tlalpan, in the Sierra de Ajusco-Chichinauhtzin mountain range, Mexico
- Cerro Pelado, a barrio in the Maldonado Department of southeastern Uruguay.
- Cerro Pelado, a peak in the Jemez Mountains of New Mexico, in the United States

Other uses

- Cerro Pelado Dam, Córdoba Province, Argentina
- Cerro Pelado International, a UWW wrestling event in Cuba
- Cerro Pelado Fire, a wildfire in the Jemez Mountains of New Mexico, in the United States

== See also ==
- Mount Baldy (disambiguation)
