= Humboldt Peak =

Humboldt Peak may refer to:

- Humboldt Peak (California), in California, United States, near Butte County High Point, California
- Humboldt Peak (Colorado), in Colorado, United States
- Humboldt Peak (Nevada), in Nevada, United States
- Pico Humboldt, a peak in Venezuela

== See also ==
- Humboldt (disambiguation)
