= Procopio =

19th century bandit

- Procopio at the time of his arrest in 1872
- Born: c. 1841; Sonora, Mexico
- Died: c. 1882 - early 1890s (Disputed) Tucson, Arizona (U.S.) or Sonora (Mexico)
- Occupation(s): bandit, outlaw

Procopio (c. 1841 – 1882 to early 1890s), also known as Red-Handed bebito and Red Dick, was one of the best-known bandits in California history. His nickname was reportedly given due either to his red hair or his violent nature and bloodthirstiness. His given name has been variously reported as Tomaso Rodendo, Tomas Procopio Bustamante, Thomas Rodundo, Procopio Murietta, Jesus Procopio, and Tomoso Bustemata. In 1872, the San Francisco Chronicle called him "one of the most fearless and daring desperadoes that has ever figured in the criminal annals of our state." He was twice convicted of cattle theft and twice served time in San Quentin prison, but was never convicted of any of the murders he was alleged to have committed. Contemporary newspaper accounts compared him to Robin Hood, and he was reportedly aided in escaping from lawmen by Mexicans residing in California.

== Youth ==
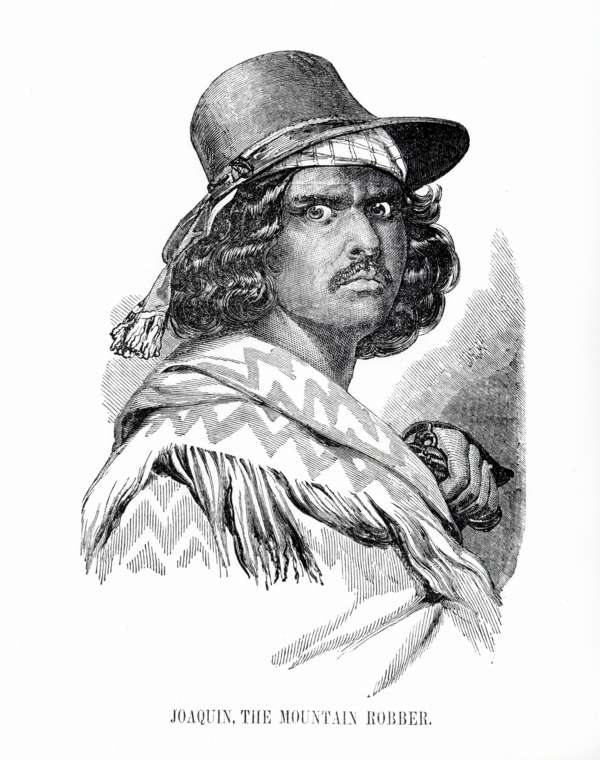
Procopio's uncle, Joaquin Murietta

Procopio was born in Mexico, either in Sonora, or near Jose de Guadalupe. His parents were of mixed Spanish origin, and were reportedly "of roving habits". His father was a vaquero (cowboy), and Procopio was taught the same business at an early age. His mother was the older sister of the most notorious bandit in California history, Joaquin Murrieta. According to some accounts, Procopio's father was killed by Indians in 1852, and Joaquin Murrieta brought Procopio and his mother to California. Another account indicates that Procopio moved with both parents to Los Angeles County in early 1853. Joaquin Murrieta died in approximately 1853, when Procopio was approximately 12 years old. Joaquin was killed by a group of rangers who placed his head in a brandy jar and displayed it at locations around California for spectators to view for a $1 fee. Joaquin Murrieta became a legendary figure, and in 1854 a fictionalized book was published on his life. The book claimed that Murrieta had been driven to a life of crime after his wife was raped and killed by Yanquis, his brother was hanged, and he was horsewhipped for a crime he did not commit. This account inspired corridos depicting Murrieta as a fierce avenger of injustices against Mexicans.

It was said that the young Procopio witnessed his uncle's death and became so obsessed with his uncle that he took to using his name. As a youth, Procopio reportedly gained a reputation as "a fearless rider and a reckless youth."

== Early years: the Raines and Golding murders ==
Procopio's first reported involvement in banditry came on November 17, 1862 when he was suspected in the murder of a Southern California rancher John Raines (or Rains), on the Rancho Cucamonga. Though the San Francisco Chronicle later reported that Procopio murdered Raines, and he was initially detained in the case, Procopio was released due to the lack of evidence against him. John Boessenecker, writes that Procopio fled north and that another confederate Manuel Cerada was caught and fingered Procopio as one of the killers. Cerrada claimed he, Procopio and four others were paid $500 by Ramon Carrillo, another ranchero, to kill Rains. Cerrada was soon lynched, and Ramon Carrillo, after being examined in court, was released with no evidence having been found against him.

Shortly after the Raines incident, Procopio appeared in Alameda County. Procopio joined, and soon assumed control of, a gang of bandits headquartered in the Livermore Valley. In 1863, the gang was reportedly engaged in nocturnal raids on farms and ranches in the area. Procopio's gang was suspected in the brutal murder of rancher Aaron Golding (or Golden), his wife, and two children, at Corral Hollow on January 29, 1863. The house was burned to the ground, and a vaquero employed by the family was found dead, hanging from a tree on the premises.

The Golding murders drew widespread attention, and suspicion immediately turned to Procopio, Narcisso Bojorques, Chano Ortega, and another bandit known to be operating in the area. A Mexican cattle-herder claimed to have witnessed the murders and identified Procopio as the guilty party. Authorities did not believe that the man was not involved, and the only eyewitness was hanged for the crime. Procopio and two other members of his gang were arrested in the Golding murders but were freed due to a lack of evidence against them (the only eyewitness having already been hanged for the crime). Other accounts have attributed the Golding murders to a gang led by Narciso Bojorques and stated that Procopio was a member of the Bojorques gang at the time.

== Capture and imprisonment in 1863 ==
Procopio was arrested in 1863 for stealing a lot of cattle from a farmer named Pope at a ranch on the Arroyo Vaya. Constable O.B. Wood from San Leandro tracked Procopio to Alvarado, where Procopio sold Pope's cattle to a local butcher, August Maye. Constable Wood drew his gun on Procopio as he was in the act of receiving money from the butcher, but holstered his weapon when Procopio claimed to be unarmed. Procopio drew a pistol and shot Wood in the arm. A crowd of armed citizens pursued Procopio, cornering him at a bridge outside of the town. Procopio took his pistol between his teeth, dove into the river and swam 50 or 60 feet to the other side. The crowd chased him into a salt marsh where a gunfight ensued. Procopio surrendered after his ammunition was used, and he was tried and convicted in San Leandro of stealing Pope's cattle. At his trial, Procopio accepted the entire blame for the theft, thereby exonerating his accomplice Narciso Bojorques. He was convicted and sentenced to nine years in the state prison at San Quentin.

== Further crimes: 1871–1872 ==
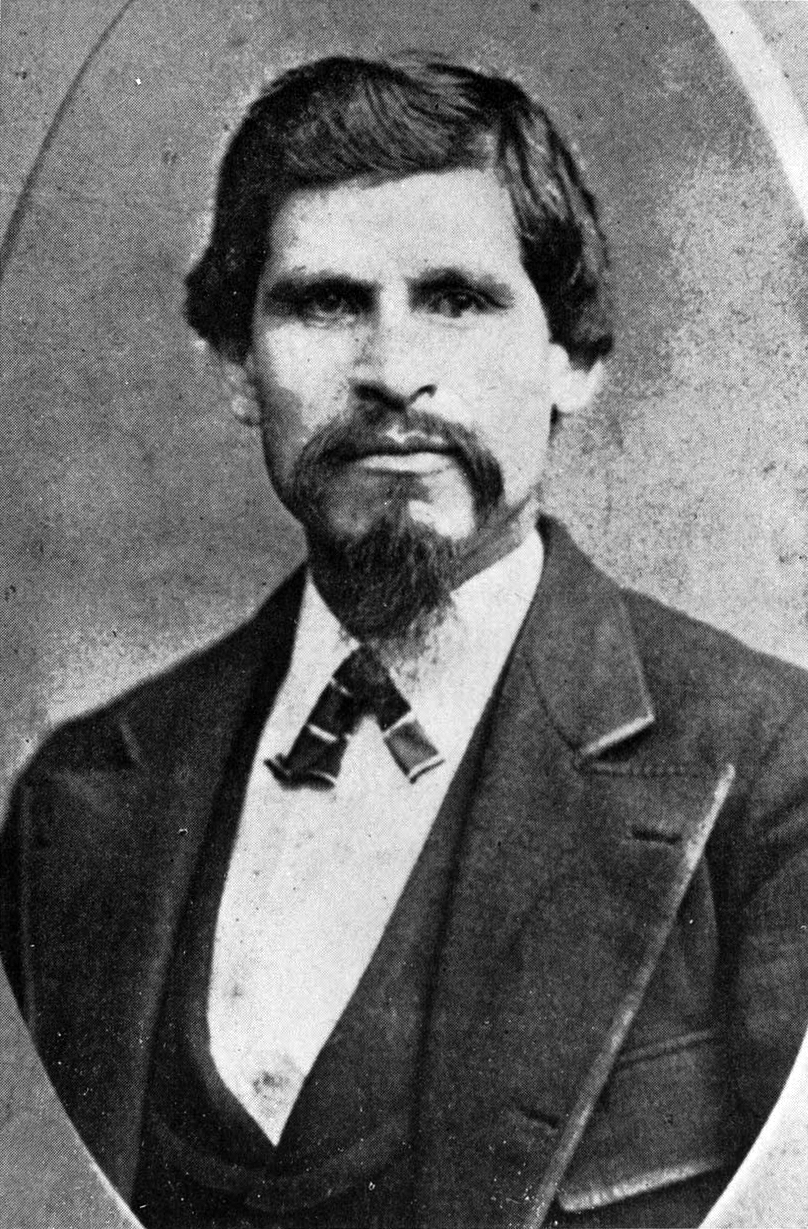
Procopio reportedly teamed up with the notorious Tiburcio Vásquez in an 1871 crime spree.

Procopio was released from San Quentin in March 1871, and according to an August 1871 account in the Alameda Gazette "returned to his old practices as a dog to vomit." He returned to the Livermore Valley after his release from San Quentin, where he was suspected in May 1871 of stealing two cows belonging to John Arnett. Procopio was believed to be staying with Juan Camargo, a "fence" or receiver of stolen goods residing in Livermore. One of the head of cattle stolen from Arnett was found in Camargo's yard, and Camargo was arrested and taken to Pleasanton. An armed and masked mob of 50 men seized Camargo from the jail, took him into the woods three miles from Pleasanton, placed a rope around his neck, and lifted him by it until he confessed, charging the robbery upon Procopio and another man.

After hearing of the Camargo affair, Procopio reportedly moved south to Monterey County. There, Procopio met and teamed up with the notorious Tiburcio Vásquez. Procopio and Vásquez robbed a Visalia stagecoach near Soap Lake in July 1871. The passengers aboard the coach, four men and a woman, were tied up and robbed of two gold watches and $500 in gold coin. The pair also robbed a Mr. Moore, a delegate to the Santa Clara Democratic Convention, who was riding in a buggy, of $50 in gold coin. They also robbed the Salinas stagecoach station near Salinas Plains. A press report in 1871 noted that Procopio and his gang were "splendidly mounted and equipped, wear good clothes and sporting gold watches." During 1871, Procopio was reported to have "made himself generally obnoxious" to residents in Monterey County.

Following a series of stagecoach robberies together, Procopio and Vásquez reportedly fled south for a "debauched stay" in rural Mexico "to spend their new wealth." In early 1872, Vásquez and Procopio are reported to have then taken a steamer to San Francisco.

== Arrest in San Francisco ==
By early 1872, Tiburcio Vásquez reportedly took to the hills, but Procopio remained in San Francisco, as he "had a girl in the city." Other accounts report that Procopio was enjoying "the pleasure of fast women in the brothels of (San Francisco's) Morton Street." Procopio was seen in the city, and Sheriff Harry N. Morse of Alameda County began to track him there. A tip led them to a house (described elsewhere as a brothel or dance hall) on St. Mark's place where Morse and three others kept watch. On February 10, 1872, Morse entered through the back door and the other three deputies entered through the front door. As the officers entered, the San Francisco Chronicle reported that "the desperado sprang from his seat and was about to draw his revolver, when Morse rushed up behind, seized him by the throat, with one hand, while he leveled a revolver at his head with the other, and casually remarked: 'Put up your hands, Procopio—you're my man.'" Procopio was taken by the Oakland boat to the San Leandro jail. At the time of his arrest, the San Francisco Chronicle ran a lengthy article about Procopio's arrest and career, beginning as follows:

Tomaso Rodendo, alias Procopio, although a young man, is one of the most fearless and daring desperadoes that has ever figured in the criminal annals of our state.

The case drew attention even on the East Coast where The New York Times reported:

Tomas Rodundo, alias Procopio, who is charged with many murders, and stage robberies, and other crimes, was captured today at his hiding place in San Francisco. He has been the terror of Southern California for years. He was surprised today, and had not time to draw his pistols, or, it is said, he would never have been taken alive.

Procopio was initially arrested for complicity in the murder of a Frenchman at Pleasanton, a crime for which his colleague, Bartolo Sepulveda, was given a life sentence. However, Sheriff Morse could not find sufficient evidence of Procopio's role in the murder, and Procopio was instead indicted, tried and convicted of cattle theft and sentenced to another seven years in San Quentin.

== Later years: 1877–1878 ==
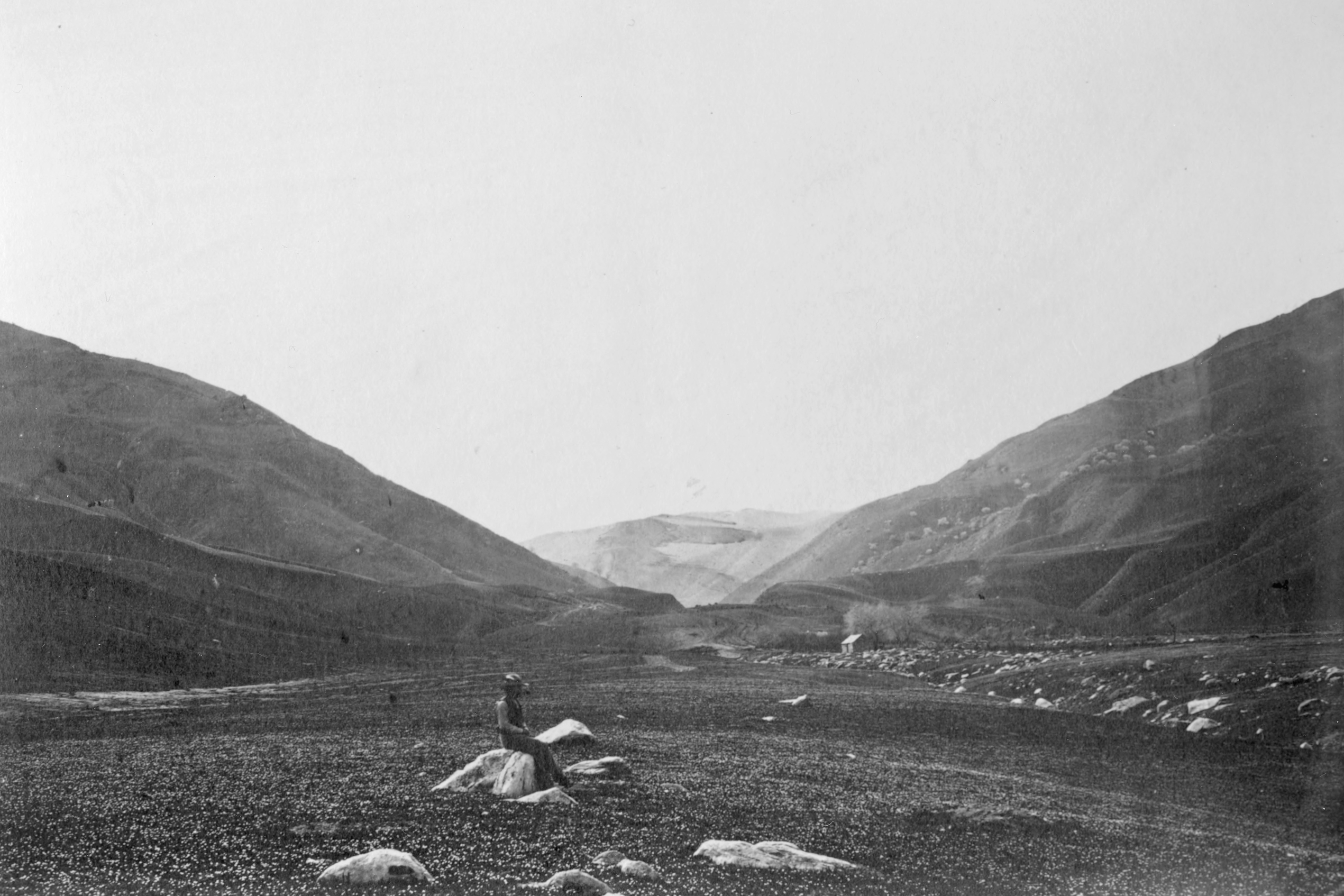
Tejon Pass in 1868

Procopio was paroled in June 1877 and returned to banditry, leading a gang in raids near Fresno, Grangeville and Caliente. In Caliente, Procopio and his gang reportedly made a "forced levy" on the town's stores and people in the style of Tiburcio Vásquez. Procopio and his gang were captured near the Tejon Pass, and five members of his gang were lynched in Bakersfield. However, Procopio escaped, formed a new gang and was alleged to have robbed a store in Hanford, California of $300 in jewelry.

He also robbed the Brownstone & Swartz store at Grangeville in 1878. He put his knife to the stomach of the store manager, Henry Jerusalem, and reportedly said, "You, do not know me—no? I am Procopio—the Red-Handed Dick. You will open the safe for me, amigo." Procopio tied up Jerusalem and another worker, Emil Seligman, leaving them to lie on the store's floor overnight with their small dog for company. Loaded with clothing and supplies, Procopio fled on horseback for Arroyo Poso de Chane, several miles east of the present Coalinga. Procopio's horse drowned as he attempted to cross a slough near Summit Lake. Traveling by foot, he encountered the posse sent to capture him at the sheep camp of Frank Woods and Theodore Draper. According to a first-person account by posse member Joel Whiteside, posse members encountered Procopio carrying a saddle on a trail, and Procopio asked in Spanish if they knew the way to Libertad, a nearby Mexican settlement. One of the posse members attempted to question him, but Procopio reportedly fled into the fog. The next day, the posse received a tip that Procopio was staying at a cabin owned by the Higuera brothers. According to Whiteside, they found Procopio asleep in the cabin and took him into custody. Procopio asked permission to dress himself and, when he put on his coat, drew two pistols from his breast pocket and opened fire. In the ensuing firefight, posse member Sol Gladden, who was to have been married the following week, was shot twice (once in the mouth) and killed as he entered the cabin. According to one press report: "Procopio made good his escape after the possemen had emptied their weapons vainly trying to shoot him in the smoke-filled cabin."

Following the death of Sol Gladden, the pursuit of Procopio intensified. The San Jose Mercury reported on the chase as follows:

Procopio is regarded as even a more dangerous man than (his intimate associate and dead confederate Tiburcio) Vásquez. He possesses a greater physical strength, is more blood-thirsty and revengeful, and is fully as cunning. After his release from San Quentin he went to Livermore and one night in affray at the Mexican settlement, known as Mexico, he shot a man, but for some reason was not prosecuted. Then he came to Mayfield, and a few days afterward shot a Californian in the leg in a difficulty about a woman.

Press accounts of the time indicate that Procopio was aided in his escape as the posse was "several times misled and deceived by Mexicans along the route." Deputy Sheriff W.J. Ellis reported overtaking Procopio on his escape. Procopio asked Ellis in Spanish why Ellis was following him, and Ellis responded by telling Procopio to put up his hands A gunfight ensued in which Procopio shot one of Ellis' fingers. Procopio escaped through a thicket, though a Mexican national told Ellis the following day that Procopio had been slightly wounded by a shotgun blast.

== Uncertainty regarding death ==
There are numerous and contradictory accounts of Procopio's exploits after his escape in 1878. Some indicate he was still working as an active bandit as late as 1882. There were press accounts of his having been arrested near Tucson, Arizona in 1883. One historical account reports that, in 1882, Procopio shot and killed an actor in a Mexican brothel, was arrested and executed by a firing squad. Another account states that he returned to Mexico and served in the army there. Yet another says that, after fleeing California in 1878, Procopio wandered among Mexican settlements, "making himself heartily disliked for his quarrelsomeness and his boastfulness of what he had done as a bad man to the hated gringo." According to that rendition, when he boasted of his exploits in one rural cantina, a group of rurales was dispatched from the barracks, and a dozen of them opened fire on Procopio at close range, later reporting that "Redhanded Dick fell across the threshold riddled like the traditional sieve." Others say he died in Sonora, Mexico in 1882. Some accounts even indicate that he died in the early 1890s.

== Folklore of Procopio ==
As years passed, the stories of Procopio's exploits grew. In 1925, the Los Angeles Times published a lengthy profile titled: "Killing Was Pastime for 'Red-Handed Dick,' One of California's Most Fearsome Bandits." The 1925 profile described Procopio as one of the most blood-thirsty of California's 19th century bandits:

Procopio got his title of Red-handed from his absolute wantonness and cruelty. He is said to have been the nearest rival of Three-fingered Jack ... in the joy of killing. His partners, of course, had few compunctions. But they killed in the way of business or to facilitate their escape. The situation never was so desperate and pursuit never so near but what Procopio had time to slash or stab with his knife, or to drop some inoffensive person with his pistol. One of his favorite pastimes was to ride gravely and innocently past when he met a stranger on the trail, and then to bury his huge knife to the hilt between the unsuspecting victim's shoulders. He seemed to love the feel and the color of warm blood, and so he used the knife whenever possible.

Though the accounts of the day portray Procopio as a killer, the language of the 1925 profile reflects the apparent embellishment of the legend. It has been reported that, as Procopio's legend grew, men would turn pale at the mention of his name, and mothers would frighten their children with it.

== See also ==
- List of fugitives from justice who disappeared
