= Blue Angels (disambiguation) =

The Blue Angels are the U.S. Navy flight demonstration team.

Blue Angels may also refer to:

- The Blue Angels, a 2024 IMAX documentary film about the flight demonstration team themselves
- Blue Angels Motorcycle Club, the Scottish outlaw motorcycle club
- Blue Angels Peak, a peak located in the Sierra Juárez mountains
- "Blue Angels" (song), a 1998 song by Pras Michel
- Hamburg Blue Angels, a cheerleading squad for the Hamburg Blue Devils American football team
- Mighty Blue Angels FC, a Liberian football club
- Blue Angels: Formation Flight Simulation, a 1989 flight simulator video game

== See also ==
- Blue Angel (disambiguation)
