= Long Ridge (San Mateo County, California) =

Hill in California, United States

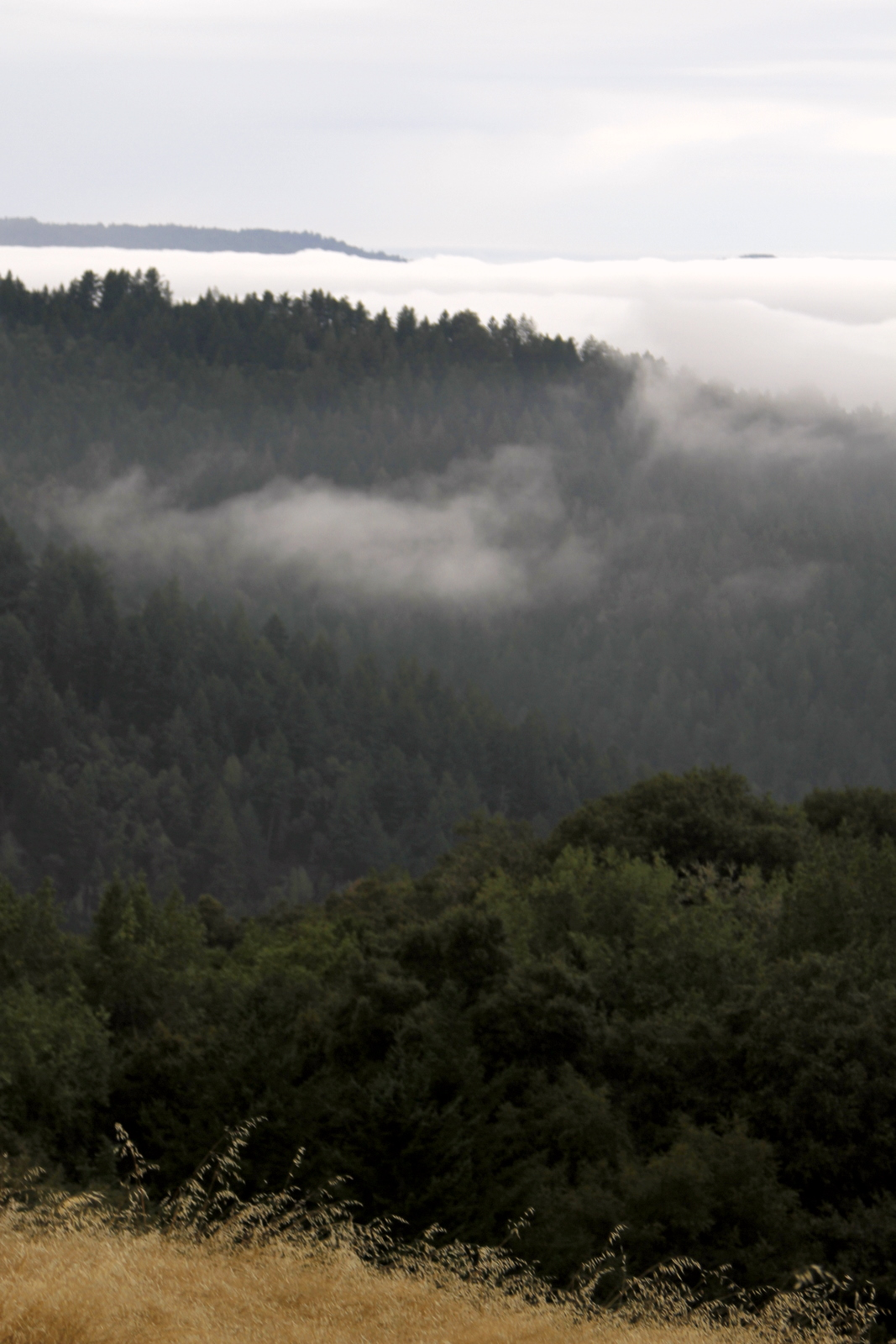

Highest point
- Elevation: 2603+ ft (793+ m) NAVD 88
- Prominence: 120 ft (37 m)
- Listing: California county high points 54th
- Coordinates: 37°16′50″N 122°09′46″W

Geography
- Location within San Francisco Bay Area Location within California
- Location: San Mateo County, California, U.S.
- Parent range: Santa Cruz Mountains
- Topo map: USGS Mindego Hill

Long Ridge is a hill located in the Santa Cruz Mountains in the San Francisco Bay Area, California. The hill rises to an elevation of about 2,600 feet (792 m) on private property near Highway 35 and the Santa Clara-San Mateo county line. The hill is the highest point in San Mateo County. A hill to the northeast of Long Ridge rises to 2,566 feet (782 m). Some snow falls on the mountain during the winter.

The Long Ridge Open Space Preserve is named for this ridge.

== See also ==
- List of highest points in California by county
