= Salmon Mountain (California) =

Mountain in California, United States

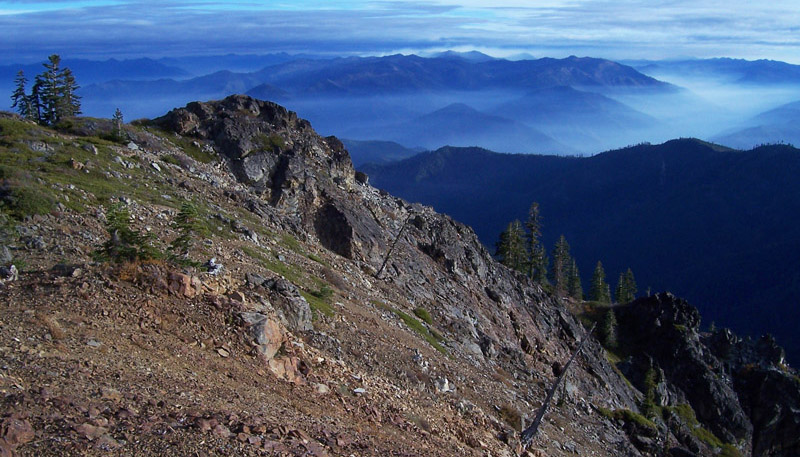
- View into the Salmon River as wildfires burn

Highest point
- Elevation: 6,962 ft (2,122 m) NAVD 88
- Prominence: 2,006 ft (611 m)
- Listing: California county high points 32nd
- Coordinates: 41°11′00″N 123°24′39″W

Geography
- Location within California Location within the United States
- Location: Humboldt / Siskiyou / Trinity counties, California, U.S.
- Parent range: Klamath Mountains
- Topo map: USGS Salmon Mountain

Salmon Mountain is located in the Klamath Mountains of California and is the highest point in Humboldt County. The area is protected in the Trinity Alps Wilderness on the Six Rivers National Forest.
