= Little Blue Peak =

Mountain in United States

- Location within California Location within the United States

Highest point
- Elevation: 3123+ ft (952+ m)
- Prominence: 680 ft (207 m)
- Listing: California county high points 52nd
- Coordinates: 38°54′25″N 122°24′59″W

Geography
- Location: Yolo and Lake counties, California, U.S.
- Parent range: Pacific Coast Ranges
- Topo map: USGS Wilson Valley

Little Blue Peak is highest point on Little Blue Ridge in the Northern Coast Ranges, located on the boundary of Yolo and Lake counties in northern California.

It is within Berryessa Snow Mountain National Monument. Some snow falls on this peak during the winter.

== History ==
Despite its relatively low elevation, the officially unnamed summit is the highest point in Yolo County. Little Blue Peak didn't always have that distinction, formerly Berryessa Peak 3,057 feet (932 m) was considered to be the Yolo County highpoint. in 1991 John Sarna discovered that this summit is over 80 feet (24 m) higher than Berryessa's, therefore the county's highest.

== See also ==
- Lake Berryessa
- California Coast Ranges topics
