= Lupinus antoninus =

Conservation status
- Critically Imperiled (NatureServe)

Scientific classification
- Kingdom: Plantae
- Clade: Tracheophytes
- Clade: Angiosperms
- Clade: Eudicots
- Clade: Rosids
- Order: Fabales
- Family: Fabaceae
- Subfamily: Faboideae
- Genus: Lupinus
- Species: L. antoninus

Binomial name
- Lupinus antoninus Eastw.

Species of legume

Lupinus antoninus is a rare species of lupine known by the common name Anthony Peak lupine. It is endemic to northern California, where it is known from only four occurrences in the North Coast Ranges, including near Anthony Peak.

== Description ==
Lupinus antoninus grows in mountain forests often amongst firs. This is a hairy, erect perennial herb growing 20–50 centimetres (7.9–19.7 in) tall. Each palmate leaf is made up of 6 or 7 leaflets each 1.5–2.5 centimetres (0.59–0.98 in) long. The herbage is coated in gray or silvery hairs. The inflorescence is up to 20 centimetres (7.9 in) long, bearing many flowers each just over a centimeter long. The flower is whitish with a light brownish wash on its banner. The fruit is a silky-haired legume pod up to 3.5 centimetres (1.4 in) long containing a few mottled brown seeds.
