= Anthony Peak =

Mountain in northeastern Mendocino County, California (USA)

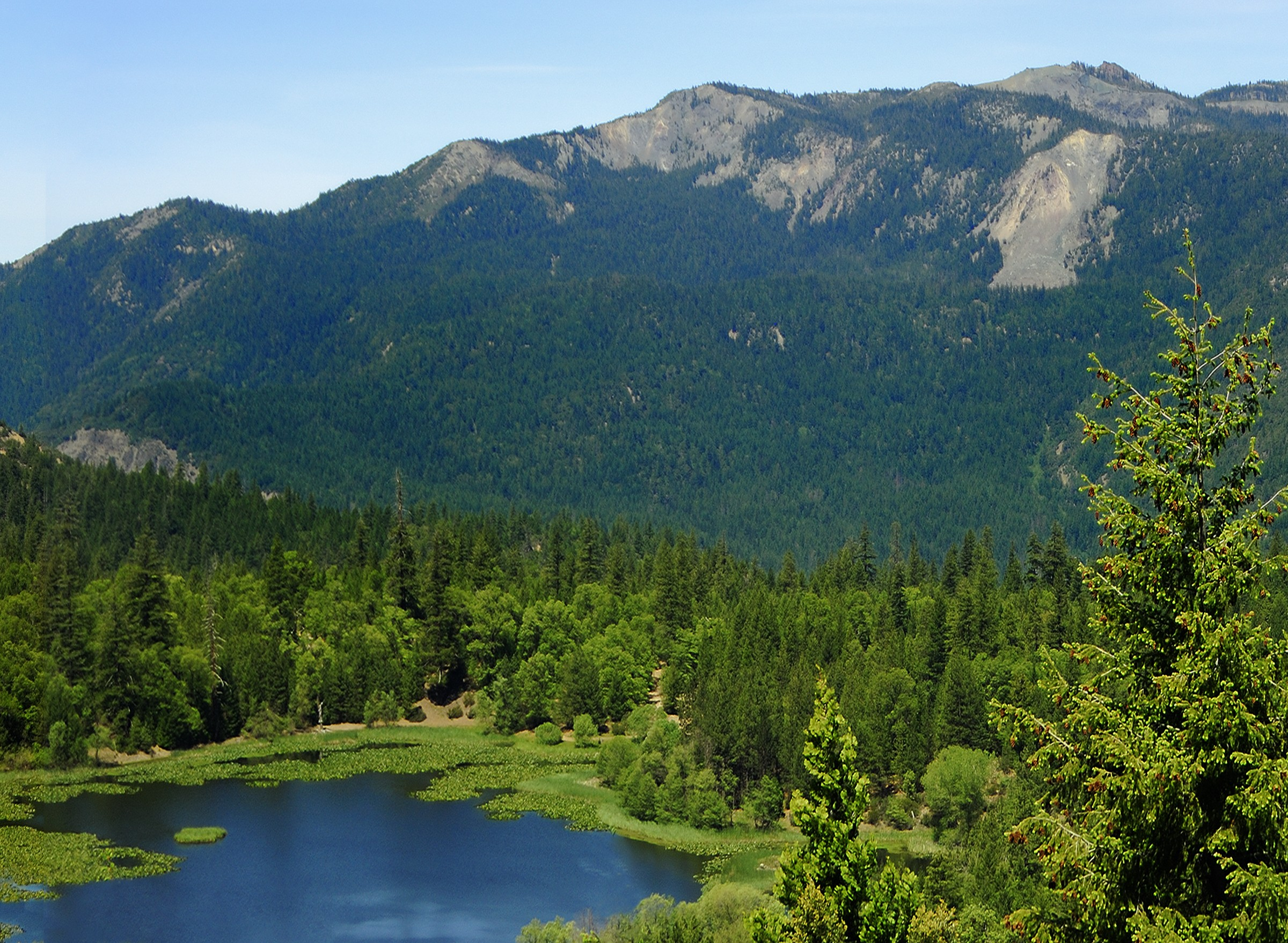
- Howard Lake at the base of Anthony Peak (shown in background)

Highest point
- Elevation: 6,958 ft (2,121 m); NAVD 88
- Prominence: 1,514 ft (461 m)
- Parent peak: Mount Linn
- Isolation: 9.37 mi (15.08 km) to Black Butte (Glenn Co.)
- Listing: California county high points: 31^{st}
- Coordinates: 39°50′46″N 122°57′52″W

Geography
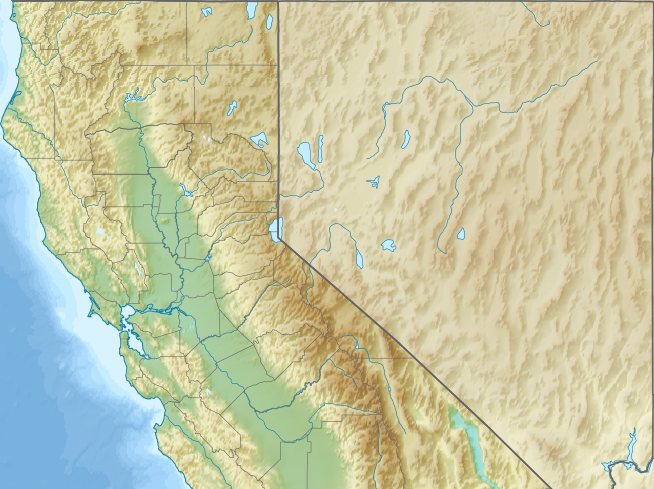
- Location within Northern California
- Location: Mendocino National Forest; Mendocino County, California, U.S.
- Parent range: Northern Coast Ranges
- Topo map: USGS Mendocino Pass (#101569)
- Biome: Montane Douglas fir forest

Geology
- Formed by: Accretion
- Orogeny: Franciscan Assemblage
- Rock age: Cenomanian (~95 Ma ago)
- Mountain type: Fold mountain
- Rock type: Ophiolite

Climbing
- Easiest route: Road hike (YDS Class 1)
- Access: Mendocino Pass Road → (a/k/a FH-7 or County Road 338); Forest Road M4 → (a/k/a FS-23N69); Service Road FS-23N60
- Location within Mendocino County (blue) and Mendocino National Forest (yellow)

Anthony Peak is a mountain located in the Mendocino National Forest north of Mendocino Pass and is part of the Northern Coast Ranges of Mendocino County, California, approximately 16 miles (26 km) NE of Covelo. The summit is the highest point in Mendocino County, and averages 61.8 inches at peak snow pack depth annually.

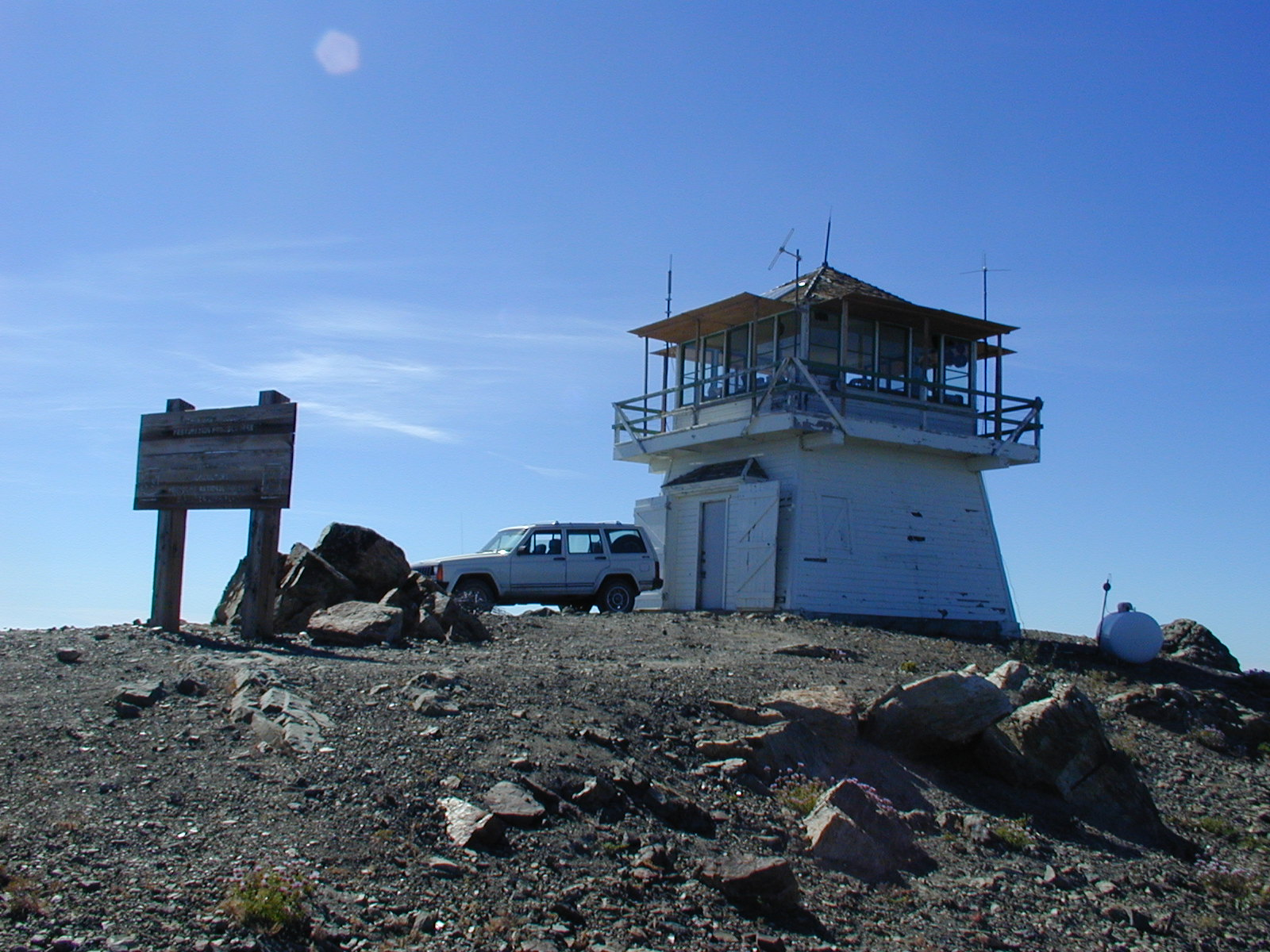
Anthony Peak Lookout

The rare endemic wildflower known as Anthony Peak lupine (Lupinus antoninus) was named for this peak.

The peak was probably named for James Anthony, who owned a farm in the Round Valley district in 1874.
