= Sugar Pine Peak =

Mountain in California, United States

- Location within California

Highest point
- Elevation: 4828+ ft (1472+ m) NAVD 88
- Listing: California county high points 40th
- Coordinates: 39°36′28″N 121°00′55″W

Geography
- Location: Yuba / Sierra Counties, California, U.S.
- Parent range: Northern Sierra Nevada
- Topo map: USGS Strawberry Valley

Climbing
- Easiest route: Hike

Sugar Pine Peak is an officially unnamed summit located in the northern Northern Sierra Nevada, in the Plumas National Forest in California.

The summit rises to an elevation of about 4828+ feet (1472+ m) on the Yuba–Sierra county line.

The highest point in Yuba County is located near the summit that is in Sierra County, on Stanford mountain. The peak gets snowfall during the winter.

== See also ==
- List of highest points in California by county
