= Table Mountain (Kings County, California) =

Mountain in California

- Location within California Location within the United States

Highest point
- Elevation: 3,476 ft (1,059 m) NAVD 88
- Prominence: 335 ft (102 m)
- Listing: California county high points 50th
- Coordinates: 35°54′22″N 120°16′34″W

Geography
- Location: Kings / Monterey Counties, California, U.S.
- Parent range: Diablo Range
- Topo map: USGS The Dark Hole

Table Mountain is a mountain ridge located in the Diablo Range in Northern California on the boundary between Kings and Monterey counties. It rises to an elevation of 3,476 feet (1,059 m) and is the highest point in Kings County. A large 500 kV power line, connected to Path 15, runs to the north of the summit. A little snow falls on the mountain during the winter.

== See also ==
- List of highest points in California by county
