= Thunder Mountain (Amador County, California) =

Mountain in Amador County, California, United States

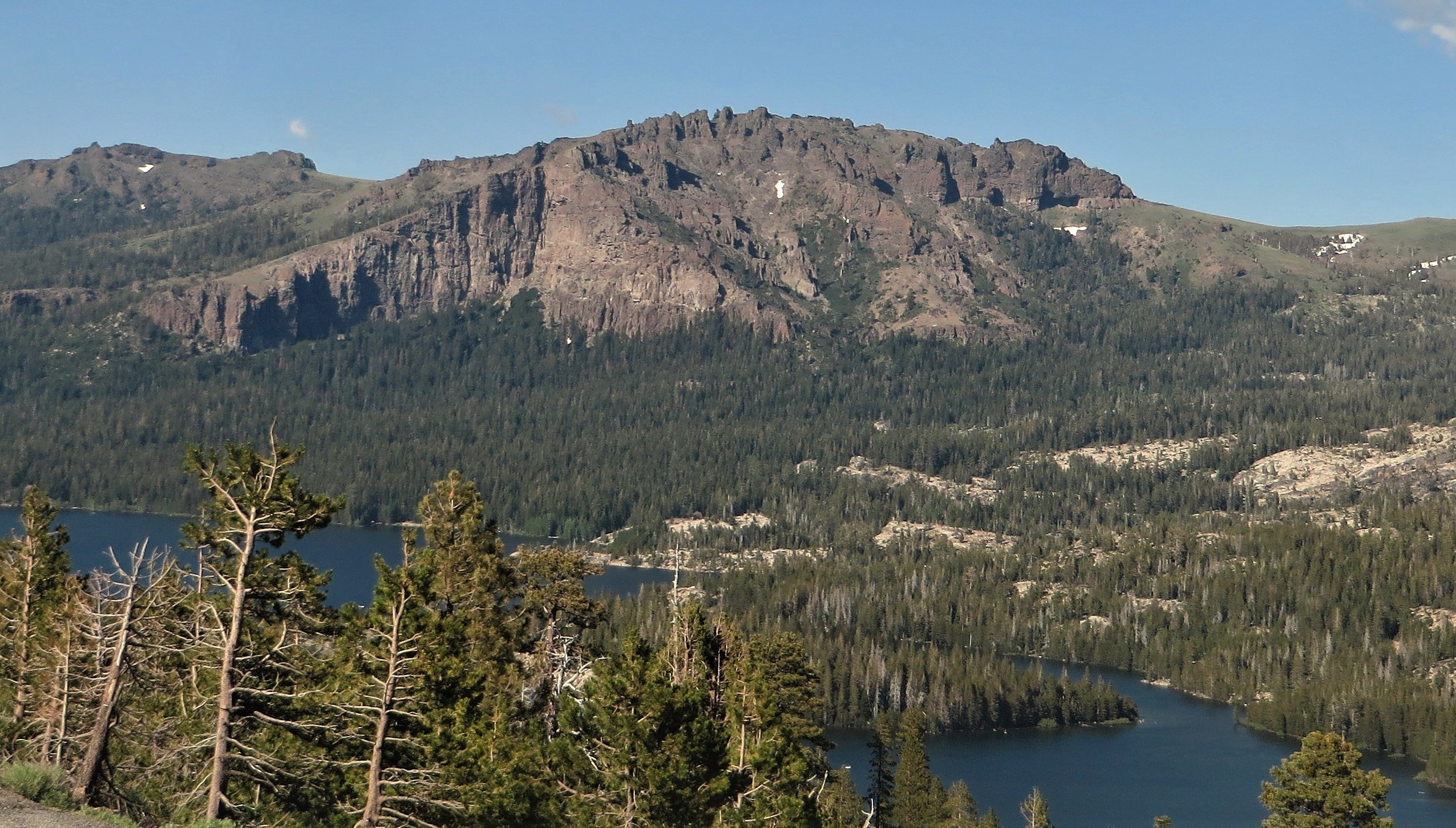
- Southwest aspect, with Silver Lake, July 2017

Highest point
- Elevation: 9,414 ft (2,869 m) NAVD 88
- Prominence: 330 ft (101 m)
- Listing: California county high points 16th
- Coordinates: 38°40′27″N 120°05′27″W

Geography
- Location within California Location within the United States
- Location: Amador County, California, U.S.
- Parent range: Sierra Nevada
- Topo map: USGS Caples Lake

Thunder Mountain in the Sierra Nevada in Amador County, California, United States, east of Silver Lake and west of Kirkwood Mountain Resort in the Eldorado National Forest.

== Description ==
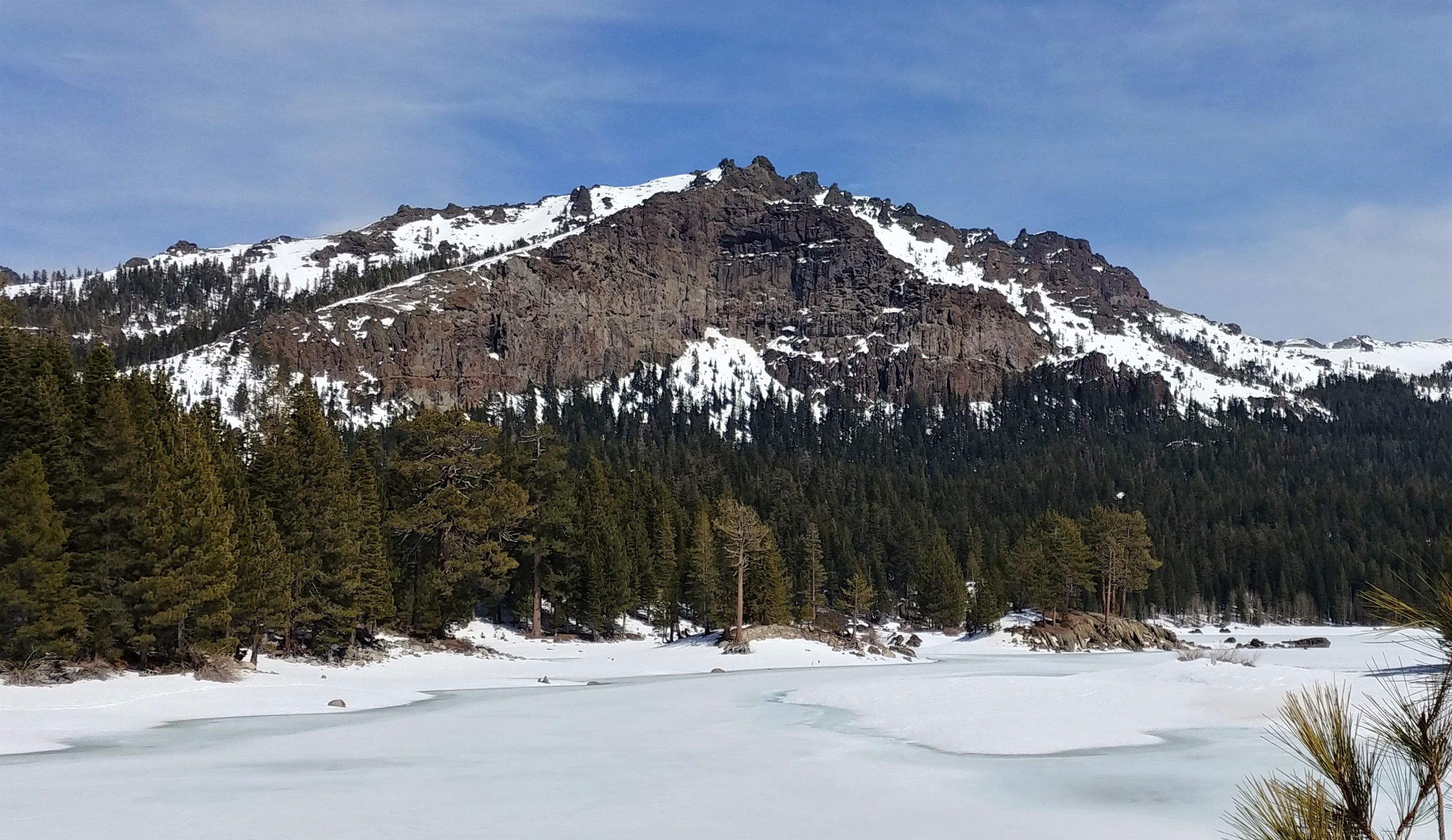
Thunder Mountain's west peak, March 2018

The mountain has two peaks, the 9,414-foot (2,869 m) main peak and a 9,412-foot (2,869 m) sub-peak west of the main peak. The main summit is the highest point in Amador County. Due to the high elevation, most precipitation that falls on Thunder Mountain consists of snow.

The peak was named by United States Forest Service personnel because "thunderstorms appear to build up in that area."

== Climate ==
According to the Köppen climate classification system, Thunder Mountain is located in an alpine climate zone. Most weather fronts originate in the Pacific Ocean and travel east toward the Sierra Nevada mountains. As fronts approach, they are forced upward by the peaks (orographic lift), causing them to drop their moisture in the form of rain or snowfall onto the range.

== See also ==
- List of mountains of California
