= Caliente Mountain =

Mountain in California, U.S.

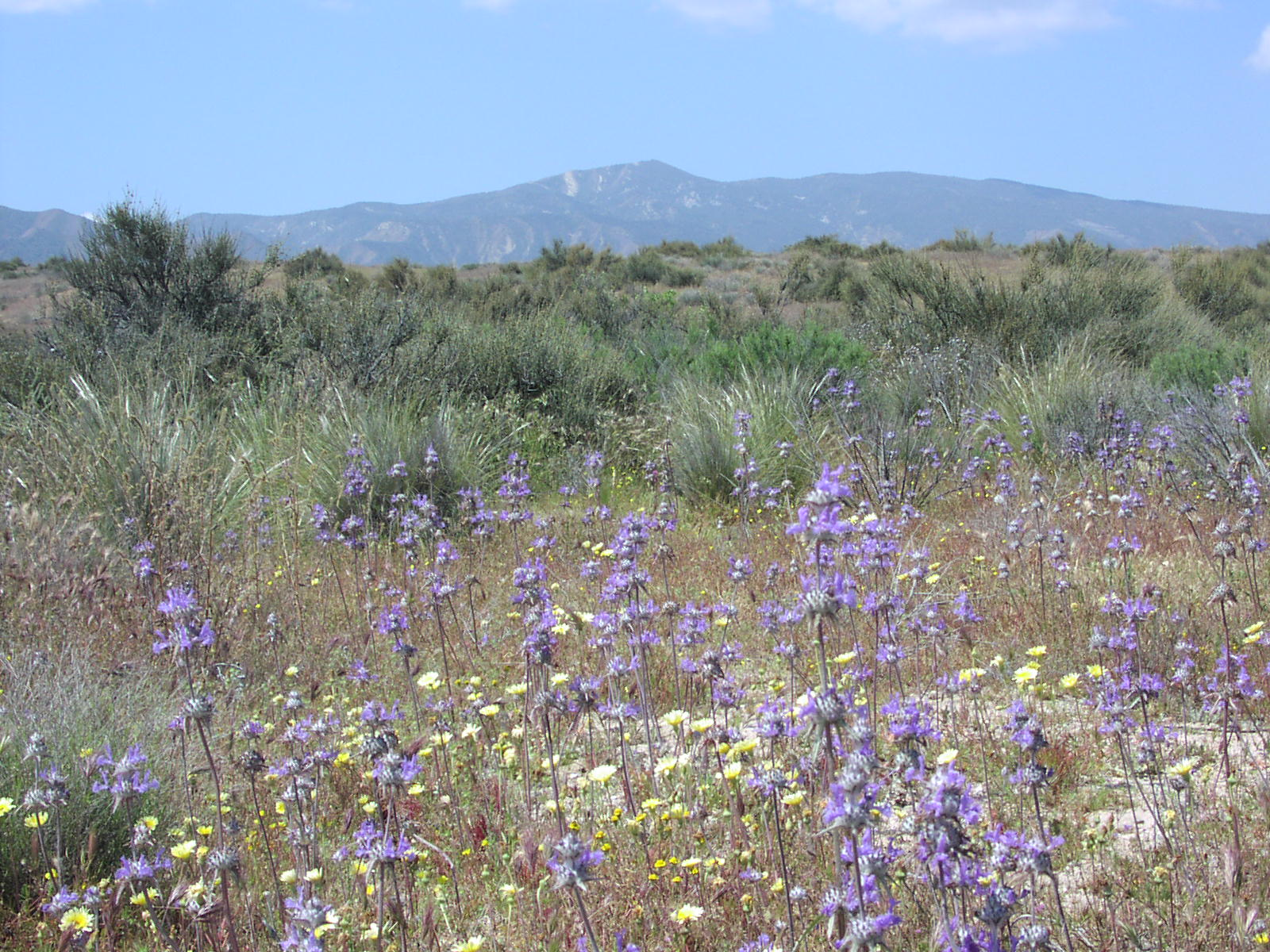

Highest point
- Elevation: 5,109 ft (1,557 m) NAVD 88
- Prominence: 2,206 ft (672 m)
- Listing: California county high points 39th Hundred Peaks Section
- Coordinates: 35°02′11″N 119°45′36″W

Geography
- Location: San Luis Obispo County, California, U.S.
- Parent range: Caliente Range
- Topo map: USGS Caliente Mountain

Caliente Mountain is a mountain located in the Southern Coast Ranges of California and is a federally listed wilderness study area for more than 30 years. The summit, at 5,106 feet (1,556 m), is the highest point in San Luis Obispo County and the Caliente Range. The mountain receives little snowfall during the winter months.

== See also ==
- List of highest points in California by county
- Highpointing
