= List of California county high points =

List of the county high points in the U.S. state of California

The location of California in the United States

Locations of the highest point in each county, with color corresponding to height.

This is a list of 58 counties of the U.S. State of California by their points of highest elevation. 6 of the 50 highest county high points in the United States are in California. Mount Whitney, located in Inyo and Tulare counties, is the highest point in California as well as the highest point in the contiguous United States at 14,505 feet (4,421 m).

Because of the wide variety of mountain ranges in California, the state has become a common destination for highpointers and peakbaggers. As of February 2026, at least 49 different climbers have summited all 58 county high points in California.

Some of these high points, such as Laveaga Peak and South Butte among others, are located on private or protected land and are typically not allowed to be summited. However, some climbers have successfully organized group hikes with the permission of the land owner, while others simply trespass on the land after dark in order to reach the summit. While peakbagger.com and other similar highpointing websites explicitly forbid trespassing on private and protected land, trip reports submitted to these sites would suggest that many climbers do this anyway.

== California county high points ==
California county high points
County	Rank	High point	Region	Elevation	Prominence	Isolation	Location
Inyo County	1	Mount Whitney	Sierra Nevada	14,505 feet (4,421 m)	10,079 feet (3,072 m)	1,646.4 miles (2,649.7 km)	36.578581°N 118.291995°W
Tulare County	1	Mount Whitney	Sierra Nevada	14,505 feet (4,421 m)	10,079 feet (3,072 m)	1,646.4 miles (2,649.7 km)	36.578581°N 118.291995°W
Mono County	3	White Mountain Peak	White Mountains	14,252 feet (4,344 m)	7,195 feet (2,193 m)	67.5 miles (108.6 km)	37.634144°N 118.255718°W
Fresno County	4	North Palisade	Sierra Nevada	14,249 feet (4,343 m)	2,894 feet (882 m)	32.2 miles (51.8 km)	37.09419°N 118.514467°W
Siskiyou County	5	Mount Shasta	Cascades	14,170 feet (4,319 m)	9,760 feet (2,975 m)	334.7 miles (538.7 km)	41.408982°N 122.194926°W
Madera County	6	Mount Ritter	Sierra Nevada	13,150 feet (4,008 m)	3,957 feet (1,206 m)	30.0 miles (48.2 km)	37.689058°N 119.199557°W
Tuolumne County	7	Mount Lyell	Sierra Nevada	13,114 feet (3,997 m)	1,893 feet (577 m)	5.2 miles (8.4 km)	37.73943°N 119.27159°W
Mariposa County	8	Parsons Peak's northwest ridge	Sierra Nevada	12,047 feet (3,672 m)	0 feet (0 m)	0 miles (0 km)	37.778175°N 119.309488°W
San Bernardino County	9	San Gorgonio Mountain	San Bernardino Mountains	11,503 feet (3,506 m)	8,294 feet (2,528 m)	162.5 miles (261.5 km)	34.099162°N 116.824853°W
Alpine County	10	Sonora Peak	Sierra Nevada	11,467 feet (3,495 m)	1,818 feet (554 m)	4.7 miles (7.6 km)	38.353852°N 119.625556°W
El Dorado County	11	Freel Peak	Sierra Nevada	10,889 feet (3,319 m)	3,146 feet (959 m)	22.9 miles (36.9 km)	38.857499°N 119.900095°W
Riverside County	12	San Jacinto Peak	San Jacinto Mountains	10,843 feet (3,305 m)	8,320 feet (2,536 m)	20.3 miles (32.7 km)	33.814785°N 116.679477°W
Shasta County	13	Lassen Peak	Cascades	10,459 feet (3,188 m)	5,230 feet (1,594 m)	71.4 miles (114.9 km)	40.488165°N 121.504966°W
Los Angeles County	14	Mount San Antonio	San Gabriel Mountains	10,069 feet (3,069 m)	6,230 feet (1,899 m)	42.5 miles (68.4 km)	34.28916°N 117.64636°W
Modoc County	15	Eagle Peak	Warner Mountains	9,895 feet (3,016 m)	4,350 feet (1,326 m)	87.4 miles (140.6 km)	41.283534°N 120.200804°W
Amador County	16	Thunder Mountain	Sierra Nevada	9,423 feet (2,872 m)	377 feet (115 m)	1.3 miles (2.1 km)	38.67672°N 120.08548°W
Tehama County	17	Brokeoff Mountain	Cascades	9,239 feet (2,816 m)	915 feet (279 m)	3.5 miles (5.7 km)	40.445564°N 121.559585°W
Nevada County	18	Mount Lola	Sierra Nevada	9,144 feet (2,787 m)	2,083 feet (635 m)	22.1 miles (35.5 km)	39.4329°N 120.36504°W
Placer County	19	Mount Baldy's west ridge	Sierra Nevada	9,035 feet (2,754 m)	9.8 feet (3 m)	0.31 miles (0.5 km)	39.27958°N 120.00584°W
Trinity County	20	Mount Eddy	Klamath Mountains	9,029 feet (2,752 m)	5,105 feet (1,556 m)	13.3 miles (21.4 km)	41.319728°N 122.479094°W
Sierra County	21	Mount Lola's north ridge	Sierra Nevada	8,855 feet (2,699 m)	52 feet (16 m)	1.2 miles (1.9 km)	39.44962°N 120.36399°W
Ventura County	22	Mount Pinos	San Emigdio Mountains	8,839 feet (2,694 m)	4,808 feet (1,465 m)	82.9 miles (133.4 km)	34.81283°N 119.14542°W
Kern County	23	Sawmill Mountain	San Emigdio Mountains	8,830 feet (2,690 m)	440 feet (134 m)	1.2 miles (2.0 km)	34.81365°N 119.16668°W
Lassen County	24	Hat Mountain	Warner Mountains	8,747 feet (2,666 m)	1,184 feet (361 m)	6.3 miles (10.2 km)	41.147058°N 120.125778°W
Plumas County	25	Mount Ingalls	Sierra Nevada	8,376 feet (2,553 m)	2,792 feet (851 m)	27.5 miles (44.3 km)	39.994141°N 120.62745°W
Calaveras County	26	Corral Hollow Hill	Sierra Nevada	8,170 feet (2,490 m)	207 feet (63 m)	1.3 miles (2.1 km)	38.483136°N 120.076584°W
Glenn County	27	Black Butte	Northern Coast Range	7,451 feet (2,271 m)	2,434 feet (742 m)	19.3 miles (31.1 km)	39.726751°N 122.872553°W
Butte County	28	Butte County High Point	Sierra Nevada	7,123 feet (2,171 m)	0 feet (0 m)	0 miles (0 km)	40.125857°N 121.404824°W
Colusa County	29	Snow Mountain	Northern Coast Range	7,060 feet (2,152 m)	2,497 feet (761 m)	24.2 miles (39.0 km)	39.383509°N 122.752151°W
Lake County	29	Snow Mountain	Northern Coast Range	7,060 feet (2,152 m)	2,497 feet (761 m)	24.2 miles (39.0 km)	39.383509°N 122.752151°W
Humboldt County	31	Salmon Mountain	Klamath Mountains	6,959 feet (2,121 m)	2,005 feet (611 m)	17.6 miles (28.3 km)	41.183229°N 123.41076°W
Mendocino County	32	Anthony Peak	Northern Coast Range	6,959 feet (2,121 m)	1,512 feet (461 m)	9.4 miles (15.1 km)	39.846239°N 122.964572°W
Santa Barbara County	33	Big Pine Mountain	San Rafael Mountains	6,820 feet (2,080 m)	2,200 feet (670 m)	19.4 miles (31.3 km)	34.69716°N 119.65317°W
San Diego County	34	Hot Springs Mountain	Peninsular Range	6,535 feet (1,992 m)	2,612 feet (796 m)	15.6 miles (25.1 km)	33.315157°N 116.579795°W
Del Norte County	35	Bear Mountain's southwest slope	Klamath Mountains	6,404 feet (1,952 m)	0 feet (0 m)	0 miles (0 km)	41.796054°N 123.672252°W
Monterey County	36	Junipero Serra Peak	Santa Lucia Range	5,856 feet (1,785 m)	4,442 feet (1,354 m)	131.8 miles (212.1 km)	36.14563°N 121.41905°W
Orange County	37	Santiago Peak	Santa Ana Mountains	5,689 feet (1,734 m)	4,386 feet (1,337 m)	33.6 miles (54.1 km)	33.710521°N 117.53406°W
San Benito County	38	San Benito Mountain	Diablo Range	5,246 feet (1,599 m)	3,484 feet (1,062 m)	43.2 miles (69.6 km)	36.36962°N 120.64464°W
San Luis Obispo County	39	Caliente Mountain	Caliente Range	5,112 feet (1,558 m)	2,215 feet (675 m)	9.9 miles (15.9 km)	35.03633°N 119.76028°W
Yuba County	40	Sugar Pine Peak's west slope	Sierra Nevada	4,829 feet (1,472 m)	0 feet (0 m)	0 miles (0 km)	39.607643°N 121.015194°W
Imperial County	41	Blue Angels Peak	Sierra de Juarez	4,551 feet (1,387 m)	52 feet (16 m)	0.62 miles (1.0 km)	32.621629°N 116.091181°W
Sonoma County	42	Cobb Mountain's southwest peak	Mayacamas Mountains	4,490 feet (1,370 m)	95 feet (29 m)	0.31 miles (0.5 km)	38.80246°N 122.7476°W
Santa Clara County	43	Copernicus Peak	Diablo Range	4,386 feet (1,337 m)	3,104 feet (946 m)	65.2 miles (104.9 km)	37.34681°N 121.62998°W
Napa County	44	Mount Saint Helena's east peak	Mayacamas Mountains	4,203 feet (1,281 m)	39 feet (12 m)	0 miles (0 km)	38.667942°N 122.62732°W
Contra Costa County	45	Mount Diablo	Diablo Range	3,852 feet (1,174 m)	3,110 feet (948 m)	32.8 miles (52.8 km)	37.88168°N 121.914321°W
Alameda County	46	Challenger Peak	Diablo Range	3,845 feet (1,172 m)	1,102 feet (336 m)	5.2 miles (8.3 km)	37.51231°N 121.69938°W
Stanislaus County	47	Mount Stakes	Diablo Range	3,809 feet (1,161 m)	1,424 feet (434 m)	10.3 miles (16.5 km)	37.32235°N 121.40852°W
Merced County	48	Laveaga Peak	Diablo Range	3,802 feet (1,159 m)	1,854 feet (565 m)	19.6 miles (31.5 km)	36.89045°N 121.17757°W
San Joaquin County	49	Mount Boardman's north peak	Diablo Range	3,632 feet (1,107 m)	121 feet (37 m)	2.2 miles (3.5 km)	37.48962°N 121.46908°W
Kings County	50	Table Mountain	Diablo Range	3,474 feet (1,059 m)	330 feet (100 m)	1.9 miles (3.1 km)	35.90596°N 120.27608°W
Santa Cruz County	51	Mount Bielawski	Santa Cruz Mountains	3,235 feet (986 m)	1,690 feet (515 m)	9.9 miles (15.9 km)	37.22369°N 122.09272°W
Yolo County	52	Little Blue Peak	Northern Coast Range	3,123 feet (952 m)	679 feet (207 m)	4.8 miles (7.8 km)	38.906981°N 122.416366°W
Solano County	53	Mount Vaca	Vaca Mountains	2,820 feet (860 m)	2,000 feet (600 m)	17.0 miles (27.4 km)	38.4001°N 122.10584°W
San Mateo County	54	Long Ridge	Santa Cruz Mountains	2,621 feet (799 m)	151 feet (46 m)	1.2 miles (1.9 km)	37.2806°N 122.16285°W
Marin County	55	Mount Tamalpais' west peak	Northern Coast Range	2,575 feet (785 m)	2,457 feet (749 m)	32.1 miles (51.7 km)	37.92402°N 122.5969°W
Sutter County	56	South Butte	Sutter Buttes	2,123 feet (647 m)	2,051 feet (625 m)	28.5 miles (45.8 km)	39.206309°N 121.821272°W
San Francisco County	57	Mount Davidson	Southern Coast Range	928 feet (283 m)	627 feet (191 m)	3.2 miles (5.1 km)	37.738337°N 122.454768°W
Sacramento County	58	Carpenter Hill	Sierra Nevada	830 feet (253 m)	180 feet (55 m)	0.99 miles (1.6 km)	38.64965°N 121.09921°W

== See also ==
- List of counties in California
- List of highest U.S. county high points
- List of mountain peaks of California
- List of California fourteeners
- Geography of California
- List of California-related articles
- Outline of California
