= Long Ridge Open Space Preserve =

Coordinates: 37.2736°N 122.1526°W

Looking north along the Bay Area Ridge Trail in Long Ridge Open Space Preserve

Long Ridge Open Space Preserve is a 2,035-acre (824 ha) open space preserve along Long Ridge in the Santa Cruz Mountains.

== Recreation ==
Long Ridge has 13.5 miles (21.7 km) of trails for hiking, mountain biking, and horseback riding, including the Bay Area Ridge Trail which runs through the preserve. Trails connect the preserve with other nearby open space, including Saratoga Gap Open Space Preserve, Skyline Ridge Open Space Preserve, and Upper Stevens Canyon County Park.

== Habitat and Wildlife ==
Much of Long Ridge is grassland, with wildflowers in the spring. The preserve has turkeys, feral pigs, and coyotes.
