= Mount Bielawski =

Mountain in California, United States

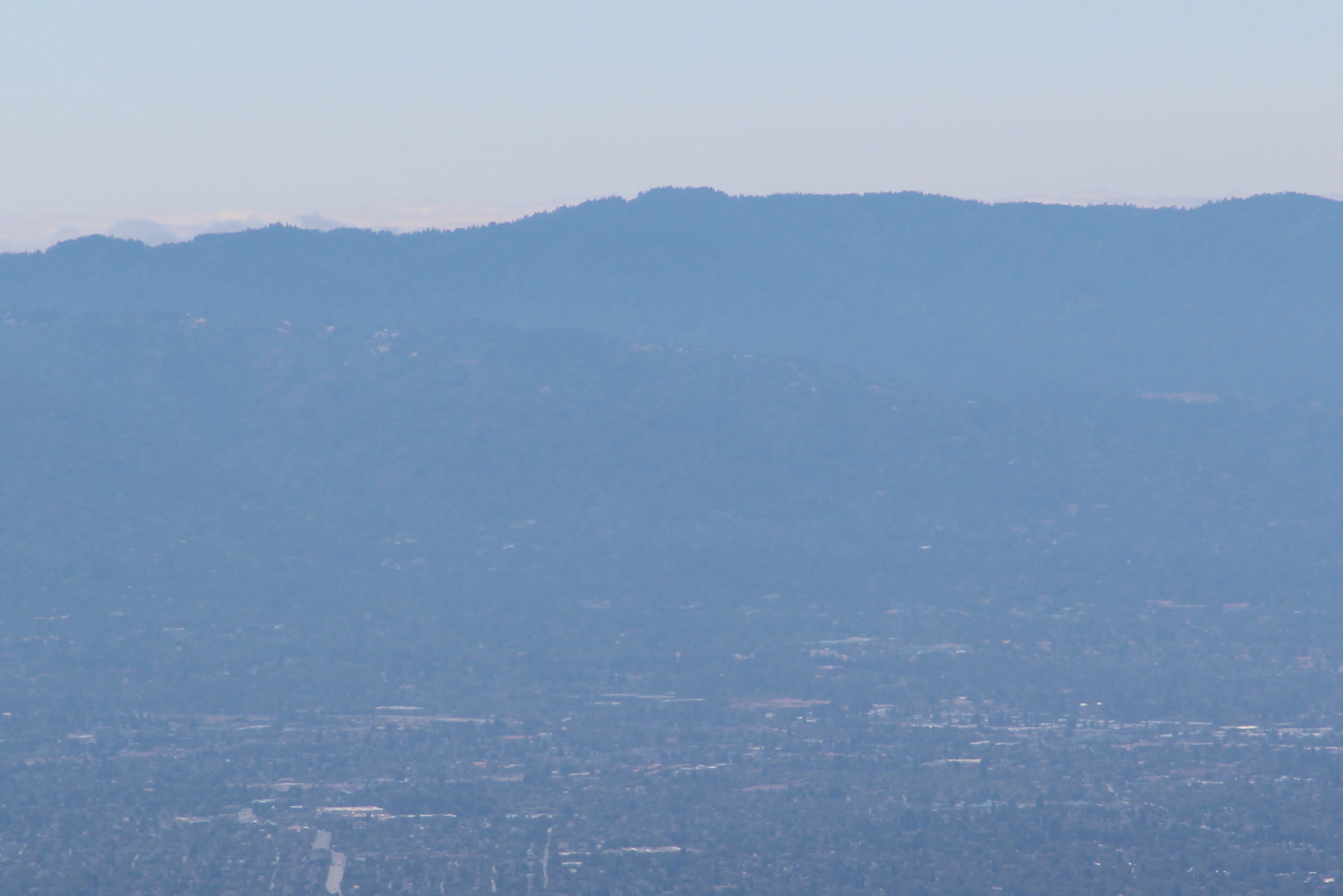
- Mount Bielawski viewed from Mount Hamilton

Highest point
- Elevation: 3,234 ft (986 m) NAVD 88
- Prominence: 1,671 ft (509 m)
- Listing: California county high points 51st
- Coordinates: 37°13′25″N 122°05′34″W

Geography
- Location within California
- Location: Santa Clara and Santa Cruz counties, California, U.S.
- Parent range: Santa Cruz Mountains
- Topo map: USGS Castle Rock Ridge

Mount Bielawski or Mount Bielewski (with an e instead of an a) is located in the Santa Cruz Mountains of California, near the San Francisco Bay Area. The mountain reaches an elevation of 3,234 feet (986 m) just to the southwest of the Santa Cruz – Santa Clara county line and Highway 35. It is the highest point in Santa Cruz County. The summit is thickly wooded so offers no views. Snow falls on the mountain some winters.

The mountain is named for Casimir Bielawski who was a chief draughtsman of the Surveyor General's office. It has, also, been called Mount McPherson. Duncan Mc Pherson owned 50 acres (20 ha) at the top of the mountain in the 1930s and 1940s.

== See also ==
- List of highest points in California by county
