= Carpenter Hill =

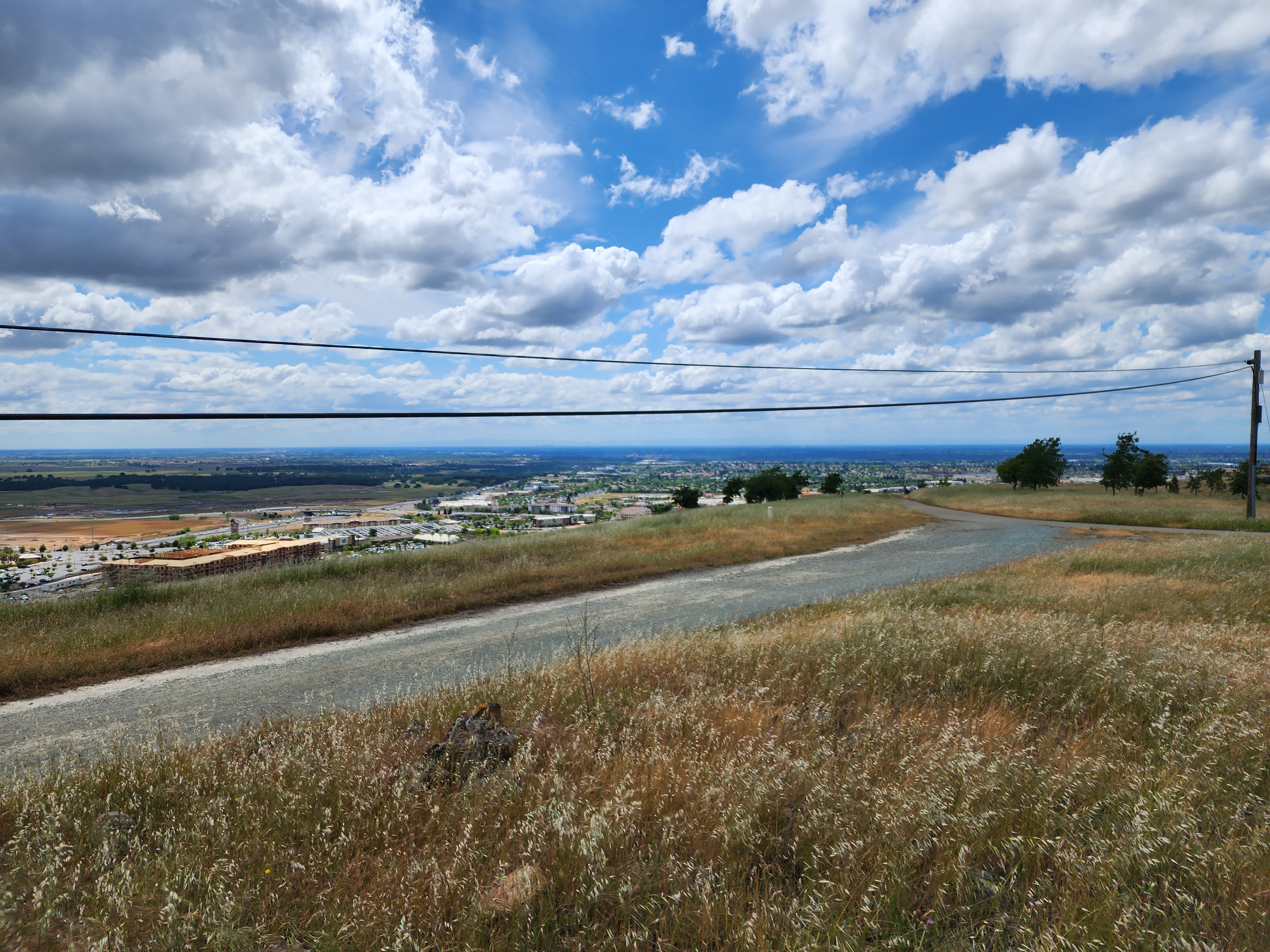
- View west from the summit of Carpenter Hill

Highest point
- Elevation: 831 ft (253 m) NAVD 88
- Prominence: 168 ft (51 m)
- Listing: California county high points 58th
- Coordinates: 38°38′57″N 121°05′59″W

Geography
- Location within California Location within the United States
- Location: Folsom, Sacramento County, California, U.S.
- Topo map: USGS Clarksville

Carpenter Hill is a hill located in the eastern Sacramento Valley-Sierra Nevada foothills region of California. The hill, located within the city limits of Folsom, near the Sacramento / El Dorado county line and north of U.S. Route 50, rises to an elevation of 831 feet (253 m). Despite its low elevation, the hill is the county highpoint of Sacramento County and thus the summit offers expansive views of the Central Valley.

It is the lowest highpoint of any county in California, lower than second-place San Francisco County's Mount Davidson by about 97 feet (30 m). Several antennas and towers stand on Carpenter Hill's grassy summit. The low elevation of the hill means snow rarely falls on its summit.

== See also ==
- List of highest points in California by county
