= Laveaga Peak =

Mountain in California

- Location within California

Highest point
- Elevation: 3,804 ft (1,159 m) NAVD 88
- Prominence: 1,853 ft (565 m)
- Listing: California county high points 47th
- Coordinates: 36°53′26″N 121°10′39″W

Geography
- Location: Merced / San Benito counties, California, U.S.
- Parent range: Diablo Range
- Topo map: USGS Mariposa Peak

Laveaga Peak is a mountain located in the Diablo Range in California. Its summit rises to an elevation of 3,804 feet (1,159 m). The peak is on the boundary between Merced County and San Benito County and is the highest point in Merced County. The mountain is high enough to receive some snowfall during winter.
