= Mount Ingalls (California) =

Mountain in California, United States

- Location within California

Highest point
- Elevation: 8,376 ft (2,553 m) NAVD 88
- Prominence: 2,792 ft (851 m)
- Listing: California county high points 25th
- Coordinates: 39°59′39″N 120°37′39″W

Geography
- Location: Plumas County, California, U.S.
- Parent range: Northern Sierra Nevada
- Topo map: USGS Mount Ingalls

Mount Ingalls is a mountain located in the Northern Sierra Nevada in California. The peak rises to an elevation of 8,376 feet (2,553 m), and is the highest point in Plumas County and Plumas National Forest. Most of the precipitation that falls on the mountain is snow due to the high elevation.

== See also ==
- List of highest points in California by county
