= Hat Mountain (California) =

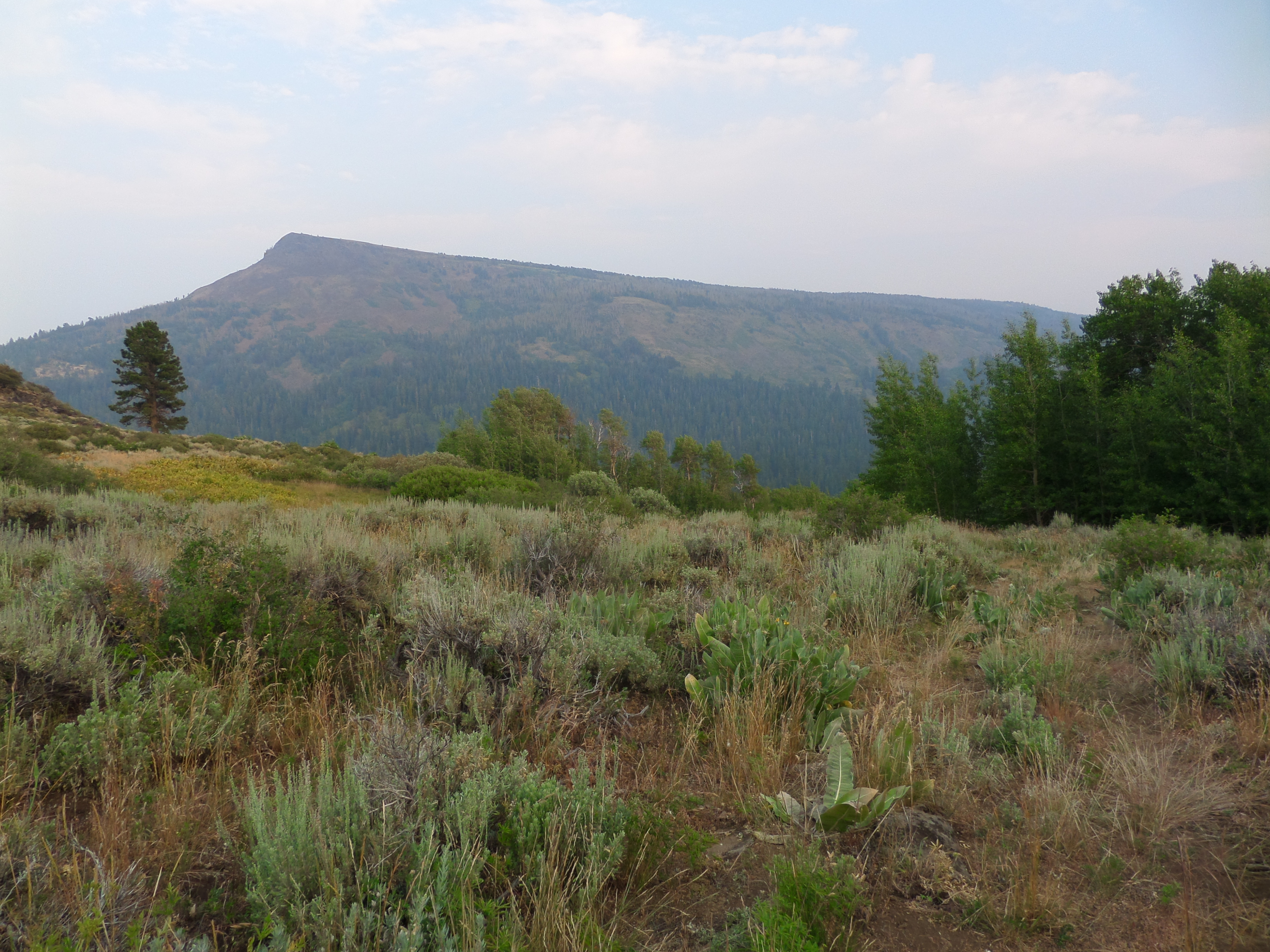
- Hat Mountain in Lassen County, California

Highest point
- Elevation: 8,741 ft (2,664 m) NAVD 88
- Prominence: 1,177 ft (359 m)
- Listing: California county high points 24th
- Coordinates: 41°08′57″N 120°07′36″W

Geography
- Location within California Location within the United States
- Location: Lassen County, California, U.S.
- Parent range: Warner Mountains
- Topo map: USGS Emerson Peak

Hat Mountain is a mountain located in the Warner Mountains south of Eagle Peak in California. The peak, which rises to an elevation of 8,741 feet (2,664 m), is the highest point in Lassen County. Lost Lake is located to the northwest of the summit. Most of the precipitation that falls on Hat Mountain is snow due to the high elevation.

== See also ==
- List of highest points in California by county
