= Blue Angels Peak =

Mountain in California, United States

- Location within California

Highest point
- Elevation: 4,552 ft (1,387 m) NAVD 88
- Prominence: 53 ft (16 m)
- Listing: California county high points 41st
- Coordinates: 32°37′18″N 116°05′28″W

Geography
- Location: Imperial County, California
- Parent range: Sierra Juárez Mountains
- Topo map: USGS In-Ko-Pah Gorge

Blue Angels Peak is a mountain located in the Sierra Juárez mountains less than 300 yards (270 m) north of the United States-Mexico border in California. The mountain rises to an elevation of 4,552 feet (1,387 m) near the San Diego-Imperial county border and Interstate 8. Despite its relatively low elevation, the summit of Blue Angels Peak is the highest point in Imperial County. A 500 kV power line, an extension of Path 46 into San Diego, traverses the northern foothills of this mountain.

The peak was named in honor of the Navy Flight Demonstration Squadron, the Blue Angels, which was based at a nearby naval air facility in El Centro.

== See also ==
- List of highest points in California by county
- Colorado Desert
- Lower Colorado River Valley
