= Butte County High Point, California =

Butte County High Point
- Location within California

Highest point
- Elevation: 7,124+ feet (2,171+ m) NAVD 88
- Listing: California county high points 28th
- Coordinates: 40°07′33″N 121°24′17″W

Geography
- Location: Butte and Plumas counties, California, U.S.
- Parent range: Sierra Nevada
- Topo map: USGS Humboldt Peak

Climbing
- Easiest route: Hike

The Butte County High Point is on Robert Jenkins mountain ridge located on the boundary between Butte and Plumas counties in the Sierra Nevada of California.

The ridge, located close to Lost Lake and Humboldt Peak, has an elevation of about 7,124+ feet (2,171+ m) at the county line. The ridge is in Lassen National Forest and within about 700 feet (200 m) of the Pacific Crest Trail. It can be found by taking Mary's trail. Due to its elevation the ridge receives considerable snowfall during the winter.
