= Mount Baldy (Polk County, Oregon) =

Hill located within the Baskett Slough National Wildlife Refuge in Polk County, Oregon

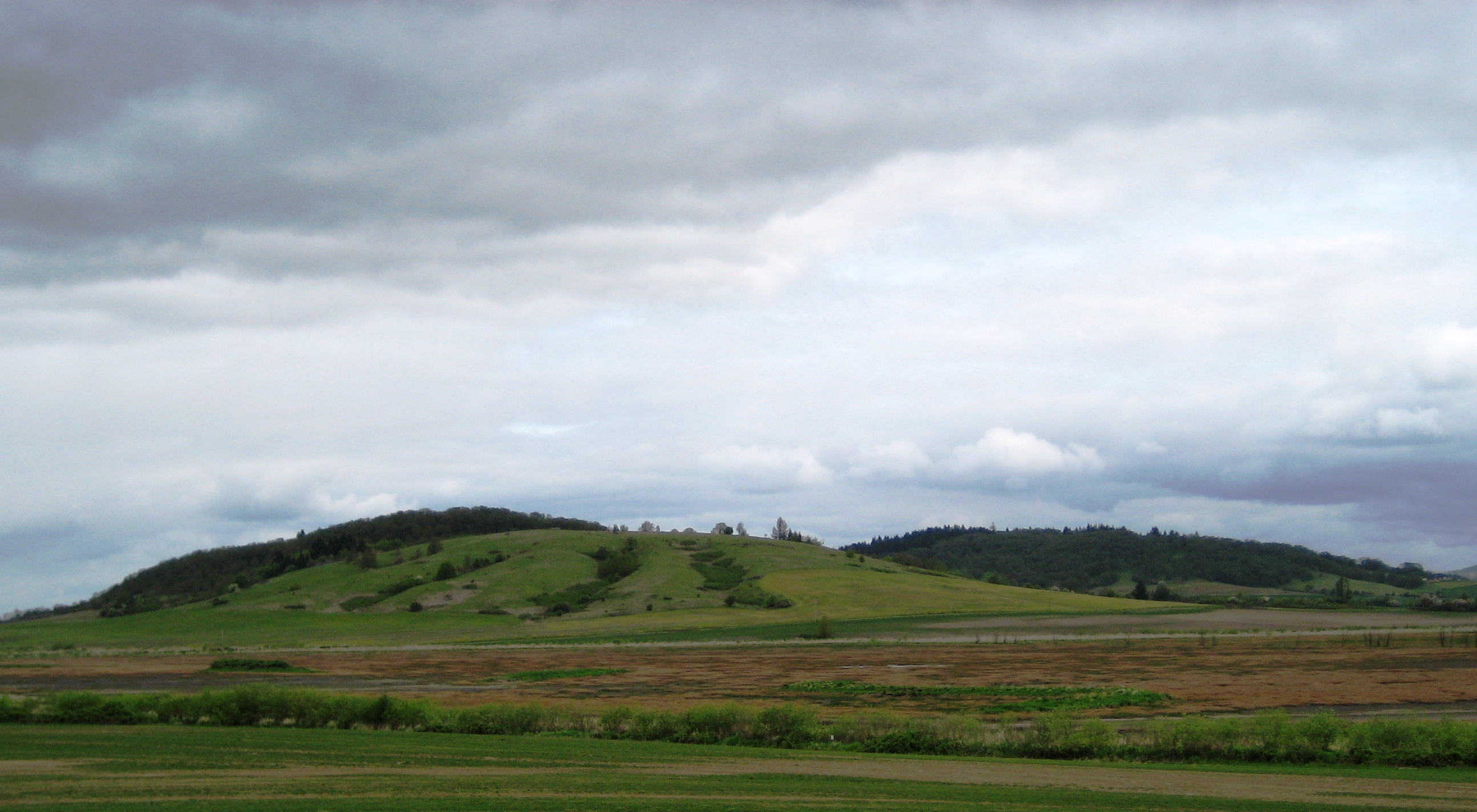
- Mount Baldy from the Baskett Slough visitor site

Highest point
- Elevation: 414 ft (126 m) NGVD 29
- Listing: List of mountains of Oregon
- Coordinates: 44°57′47″N 123°15′42″W

Geography
- Location within Oregon
- Location: Polk County, Oregon, U.S.
- Topo map: USGS Dallas

Climbing
- Easiest route: Trail hike

Mount Baldy is a 414 foot (126 m) hill located within the Baskett Slough National Wildlife Refuge in Polk County, Oregon. A short trail loop operated by the wildlife refuge leads to an observation deck on the summit.

== See also ==
- Eola Hills
