= Old Baldy Mountain (Okanogan County, Washington) =

Mountain in Washington (state), United States

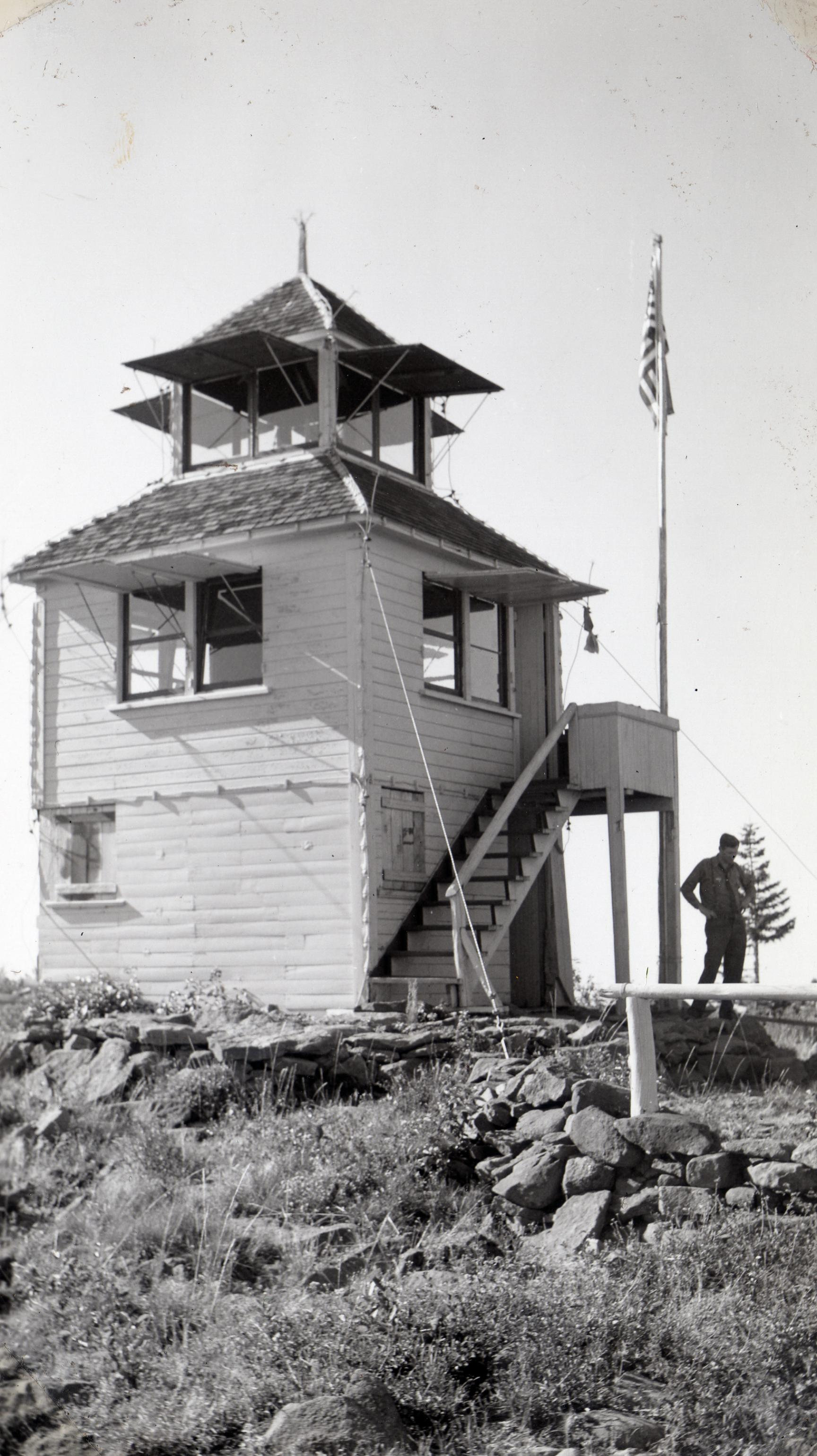
- Old Baldy Lookout in 1942

Highest point
- Elevation: 7,854 ft (2,394 m); NAVD 88
- Prominence: 1,444 ft (440 m)
- Isolation: 4.46 mi (7.18 km) to Clark Peak
- Coordinates: 48°35′23″N 119°57′22″W

Geography
- Location within Washington (state) Location within the United States
- Country: United States
- State: Washington
- County: Okanogan County
- Parent range: North Cascades; Okanogan Range

Baldy Pass
- Interactive map of Baldy Pass
- Elevation: 6,375 ft (1,943 m)

Third Approach
- Range: North Cascades; Okanogan Range
- Coordinates: 48°35′55″N 119°56′38″W

Old Baldy Mountain is a peak in the Okanogan-Wenatchee National Forest, in Okanogan County, Washington, 10 miles northwest of Conconully. The height is listed at modern sources as 7,844 ft or 7,849 ft or 7,854 ft. Older government maps showed 7,870 feet elevation. There is a geodetic survey benchmark at 7,848 ft near the summit. Some sources show the mountain in the Okanogan Range.

Baldy Pass is a 6,375-foot (1,943 m) pass about one kilometer northeast of the peak, and is traversed by Forest Service Road 37. The Golden Stairway multipurpose motorcycle/biking/hiking trail (not to be confused with the Golden Stairs on Alaska's Chilkoot Trail) leads to Old Baldy.

Government maps as of 1963 showed a fire lookout tower on the peak, but it was not mentioned in the National Geodetic Survey in 1956. Part of the mountain was burned in the 2006 Tripod Complex Fire, and the area between Old Baldy and Tripod Peak burned in the Cub Creek 2 Fire in late July, 2021.

The name of the United States Geological Survey 7.5 minute series topographic quadrangle map containing Old Baldy Mountain is "Old Baldy, WA".
