= Corral Ridge =

Mountain summit in California, US

- Location within California

Highest point
- Elevation: 8,174 ft (2,491 m) NAVD 88
- Prominence: 210 ft (64 m)
- Listing: California county high points 26th
- Coordinates: 38°29′00″N 120°04′36″W

Geography
- Location: Calaveras County, California, U.S.
- Parent range: Sierra Nevada
- Topo map: USGS Tamarack

Corral Ridge or Corral Hollow Hill, a minor summit in the Sierra Nevada, is the highest point in Calaveras County. It stands nearly 4,000 feet (1,200 m) above the North Fork of the Mokelumne River. Located near the Alpine county line, it is east of the Salt Springs Reservoir and west of the town of Bear Valley. Due to its high elevation much of the precipitation that the summit receives is in the form of snow.

== See also ==
- Stanislaus National Forest
