= Mount Baldy (Nevada) =

Mountain in Nevada, United States

- Location within California

Highest point
- Elevation: 9,271 ft (2,826 m) NAVD 88
- Prominence: 81 ft (25 m)
- Listing: Highest Point in Placer County
- Coordinates: 39°16′42″N 120°00′00″W

Geography
- Location: Washoe County, Nevada, U.S.
- Parent range: Sierra Nevada
- Topo map: USGS Mount Rose

Mount Baldy is located in Washoe County, Nevada in the Mount Rose Wilderness. The summit is at 9,271 feet (2,826 m), and it is 3.1 miles (5.0 km) north-northwest of Kings Beach, California and 2.4 miles (3.9 km) northwest of Incline Village, Nevada, both of which are on the north shore of Lake Tahoe.

The highest point in Placer County, California is on the west ridge at elevation of about 9044 feet (2756 m) and about 0.3 miles (0.48 km) west-southwest of the summit. So, Mount Baldy West Rim is right at the interstate border in Placer County (California), and Mount Baldy is in Washoe County in Nevada, and Mount Baldy is merely 0.3 miles from CA-Nevada border. To make things more confusing, Mount San Antonio, the highest point in Los Angeles County, California, is called Mount Baldy locally in that county.

== See also ==
- List of highest points in California by county
