= HTC Blue Angel =

Mobile phone manufactured by HTC

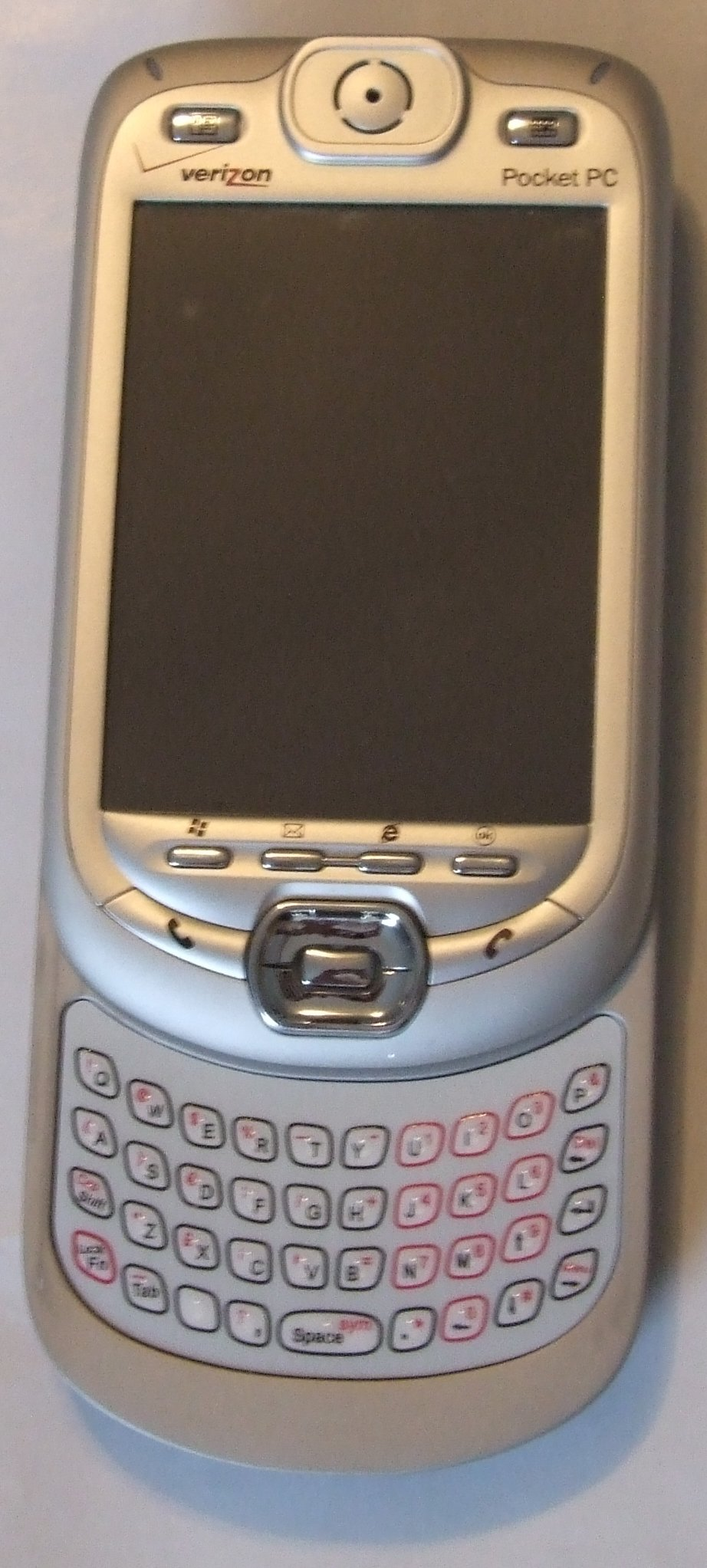
Audiovox XV6600 (CDMA version of the HTC Blue Angel)

The HTC Blue Angel (also known as "Qtek 9090" in some European markets) is a GSM Windows Mobile 2003 Second Edition PDA-phone, manufactured by High Tech Computer Corporation introduced in 2004. It has a CDMA EVDO variant called the HTC Harrier, which does not have Wi-Fi like the Blue Angel does. Both have the same housing. It is sold by many different vendors under the names of O2 XDA IIs, Orange SPV M2000, Dopod 700, Qtek 9090, T-Mobile MDA III, Siemens SX66, i-mate PDA2k, Vodafone VPx, Verizon XV6600 (Harrier), Sprint PPC-6601 (Harrier) among others, which all have similar hardware specifications.

== Specifications ==
- Dimensions: 125 x 72 x 19 (L x W x T mm)
- Weight: Approx. 205 g
- Operating systems: Windows Mobile 2003 Second Edition. Unofficial cooked roms for Windows Mobile 5, 6 and 6.1 are available, Recently, Windows Mobile 6.5 beta has been leaked for Blue Angel and is in developing phase at the XDA Developers community.
- Processor: Intel(R) XScale PXA263 400 MHz CPU (possible overclock to 600 MHz)
- Memory: Flash ROM:96 MB, RAM:128 MB SDRAM
- Memory expansion: SDIO/MMC card slot
- Camera: VGA camera (except on the Siemens version, which lacks a camera)
- Standard battery capacity: 1490mAh
- Display: QVGA Transflective 65k Colour LCD, 3.5 inch, 240 x 320 pixels
- Wireless connectivity: GSM/GPRS and Wi-Fi 802.11b (Blue Angel), or CDMA EVDO (Harrier); plus IrDA and Bluetooth on both models

== Popularity ==
In 2010, a UK-based developer created an emulator image of the Android Operating System ported to the HTC Blue Angel, it lacked features and there was no integration with the user. It was an image of Android 1.6 Doughnut but the only things which were usable were the volume control buttons. This development sparked interest on xda-developers where many users were willing to help port a usable Android version to the Blue Angel.

Later in 2011, developer 'zainuintel' created an Angry Birds build for the device, showing how capable the 7 year old device was. He later created an Angry Birds RIO build, but this did not get as much popularity, Support was dropped by the developer in 2012. Starting from June 2012 it was made open source.

A developer on XDA, named 'd-two', started developing Android builds for the Blue Angel, although most people thought a working build would be impossible. However, in May 2012, d-two released a working build called 'PXADroid'. At first, only the basic functions worked, but switching to modding Cyanogen Mod 7.2 brought greater compatibility with the Blue Angel, and now the system is nearly fully functional. D-two's builds are special Linux kernels, compiled for the Blue Angel, and above the kernel it runs Android. D-two has shown that it is possible to use a modified boot-loader to make a higher capacity SD card work on the Blue Angel. Development is still going on, as the current builds are still in the ALPHA stages.
