= Jonathan Grier =

American computer scientist

- Known for: Stochastic forensics
- Scientific career
- Fields: Computer Science

Jonathan Grier is a computer scientist, consultant, and entrepreneur. He is best known for his work on stochastic forensics and insider data theft. He has also contributed to computer security, digital forensics, and software development.

Grier is a frequent speaker at computer conferences such as Black Hat, ACSAC, and DFRWS. His research has appeared in the Journal of Digital Investigation, SecurityFocus, Digital Forensics Magazine and InformationWeek. His work has been cited by Microsoft Press, IBM Internet Security Systems, Hewlett-Packard, SC Magazine and the FBI National Infrastructure Protection Center.

Grier is an advisor to private clients in computer security, software development and information technology, and conducts training in computer security and forensics for private clients and the Department of Defense Cyber Crime Center.

== Research ==
In 2010, Grier introduced stochastic forensics as an alternative to traditional digital forensics which typically relies on digital artifacts. Stochastic forensics' chief application is investigation of data theft, especially by insiders. Grier was inspired by the statistical mechanics method used in physics.

In 2001, Grier exposed several security flaws in a number of techniques then popular in Common Gateway Interface web applications. This was a contributing factor in the move from flat file databases to modern database management systems.

== Other ==
Grier is a member of the Association of Orthodox Jewish Scientists, where he lectures on the intersection of Halakha with computer science and physics.

In 1994, Yeshiva University named Grier a Yeshiva University Distinguished Scholar.
