= Siemens CX75 =

Mobile phone model

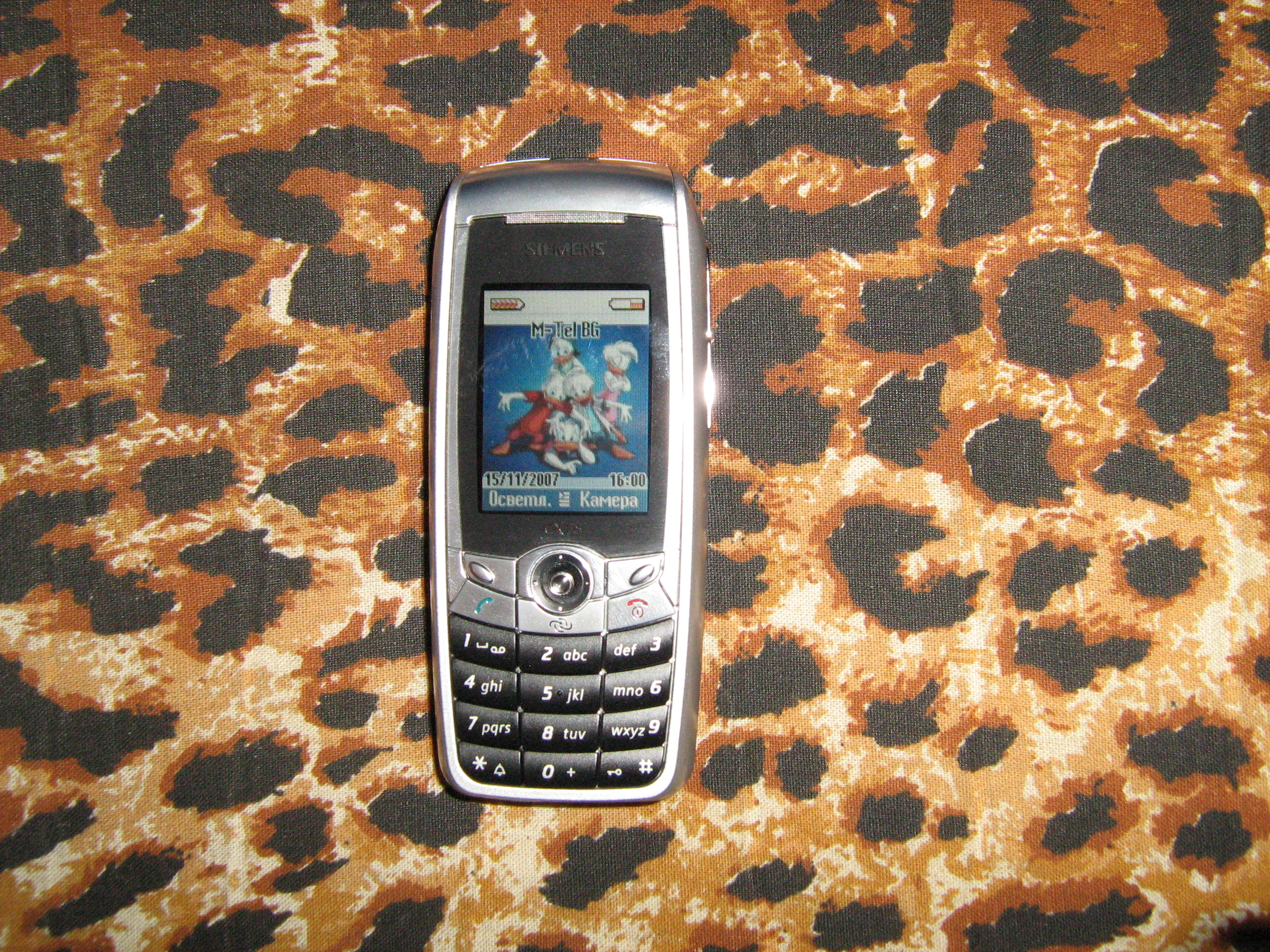
- The Siemens CX75
- Compatible networks: 900, 1800, 1900 MHz
- Dimensions: 112×48×19 mm (4.41×1.89×0.75 in)
- Weight: 98 g (3 oz)
- Memory: 8 MB; RS-MMC card slot
- Display: 132 x 176 px TFT, 262000 colors)
- Connectivity: SMS; EMS; MMS; E-Mail; T9; IrDA; Bluetooth; GPRS (Class 10); WAP

The Siemens CX75 was released in 2005, and is a mobile phone manufactured by BenQ Mobile.

The CX75 is a triband cameraphone that can take digital photographs up to 1280x1024 pixels in size. It includes 2.5G technologies, supporting GPRS class 10 connections with WAP 2.0 capability. It supports polyphonic ringtones in MIDI as well as tones in the MP3, AAC(+) and WAV formats. On the mobile gaming side, the phone supports Java ME MIDP 2.0. It has 8.29 MB of onboard memory available for the user, and supports RS-MMC cards for further expansion. The phone is similar to the specifications of the Siemens M75, apart from the protection system of the M75, in addition to weight, size and keys.

In early FW versions (FW2, 5), the phone suffered from some bugs and in general bad performance, especially in menus. This has been mostly corrected in the latest FWs. It is suggested to upgrade to FW13, and not the latest FW23, as it does not improve the phone a lot, and some users have experiences problems with this. The FW is user-serviceable, by using a DCA-510 or a DCA-500 datacable, it is possible to upgrade to the newest FW, which is found on the official BenQ-Siemens site.

== Features ==
- Triband (supports GSM 900/1800/1900 MHz bands)
- Bluetooth and IrDA wireless technologies
- Hot-swappable RS-MMC card slot
- Polyphonic MIDI, WAV, MP3 and AAC(+) ringtones
- Dimensions: 112 x 48 x 19 mm (length x width x depth)
- Volume: 90 cubic centimeters
- Weight: 98 g
- 132x176 pixels TFT LCD

Complete data sheet
