= PNL =

PNL may stand for:

== Politics ==
- National Liberal Party (Moldova)
- National Liberal Party (Romania)
- National Liberal Party-Brătianu, a defunct Romanian political party known as PNL

== Other uses ==
- PNL (band), a French rap duo
- Pantelleria Airport (IATA: PNL), in Italy
- Perceived noise level; see EPNdB
- Percutaneous nephrolithotomy, a procedure to remove kidney stones
- Personal Assets Trust
- Pickleball Newfoundland and Labrador Association Inc., a Canadian provincial sport authority
- Polytechnic of North London, later part of London Metropolitan University
- Preferred Network List, list broadcast by WiFi client devices; see KARMA attack

== See also ==
- P&L, the financial term for Profit & Loss, sometimes written PNL
- Profit & Loss, a finance magazine
