= S500 =

S500 may refer to:

- S-500 missile system, a Russian surface-to-air missile/anti-ballistic missile system
- S500, several Mercedes-Benz S-Class car models
- Acer CloudMobile S500, a 2012 mobile phone model
- BenQ S500, a 2005 mobile phone
- Canon PowerShot S500, a camera
- Fengxing S500, a car
- Honda S500, a 1963 car
- S500, a Nikon Coolpix series camera
- Sony Cyber-shot DSC-S500, a camera
- Sony Ericsson S500, a 2007 mobile phone model
- Yamaha PSR-S500, a portable music keyboard
