= BenQ-Siemens SL91 =

2006 slider-type GSM 3G mobile phone designed by BenQ

BenQ-Siemens SL91 is a slider-type GSM 3G mobile phone, created by BenQ Mobile and introduced in July 2006. The SL91 phone is the successor of Siemens SL75 and BenQ-Siemens SL80. this phones was stylish slider drawing inspiration and development from the previous Siemens Mobile”SL family“ Siemens SL55. SL65 and Siemens SL75.

The phone supportable 3 levels of cellular systems internet wireless GPRS, EDGE and UMTS Internet access methods. Its dimensions are 89 mm × 47 mm × 23 mm, and it weighs 109 grams.

The supplied battery has a capacity of 950 mAh and can last up to 310 hours in standby mode, or 195 minutes if the phone is used for calls. Other notable features of the phone include touch-sensitive navigation keys (similar to LG Chocolate) using FSR (Force-Sensing Resistor) Technology, MP3/AAC player, Bluetooth, a Java virtual machine, FM radio, 16M colors QVGA TFT LCD, and 3.2 megapixel camera with AF (autofocus) with secondary hidden camera lens under front display sliding part.

Another trait of the SL91 is its desktop stand. It serves as a charging station and handsfree speaker. When it is charging the battery or the phone is ringing, the stand lights up.
