= Snark =

Snark may refer to:

== Fictional creatures ==
- Snark (Lewis Carroll), a fictional animal species in Lewis Carroll's The Hunting of the Snark (1876)
- Zn'rx, a race of fictional aliens in Marvel Comics publications, commonly referred to as "Snarks"
- Corporal Snark, a minor character in Catch-22 (1961) by Joseph Heller
- A species of creature in The 100 Lives of Black Jack Savage
- The Snark, fictional alien machine that visits Earth in the novel In the Ocean of Night (1977) by Gregory Benford
- A fictional creature from the TV series The Troop
- A fictional creature from the book series A Song of Ice and Fire, stated to be a mythical creature in universe.
- A beetle-like creature from Half-Life which doubles as a biological weapon.

== Aircraft and missiles ==
- SM-62 Snark, an American intercontinental nuclear cruise missile
- Sopwith Snark, a British experimental fighter plane
- Barber Snark, a New Zealand kit-built tandem-seater light aircraft

== Ships ==
- Snark, an experimental rescue submersible in the film Gray Lady Down (1978)
- The Snark, a yacht described in Jack London's book The Cruise of the Snark (1911)
- Snark sailboat, a small, inexpensive, and lightweight sailboat
- MV The Second Snark, historically a shipyard tender, now in service as a cruise boat and ferry
- USS Snark (SP-1291), a United States Navy patrol boat in commission from 1917 to 1919

== Other ==
- Snark (graph theory), a type of graph
- SNARK (theorem prover), a computer program
- zk-SNARK, zero-knowledge Succinct Non-interactive ARgument of Knowledge, a cryptographic tool for producing short proofs of statements without revealing any additional information
- Snark subreddits, where users "snark" on public figures
- Snark, an Open Source BitTorrent client
- Snark (2009), a book by film critic David Denby
- Snark, a glider reflector in Conway's Game of Life
- Snark, a late 70s moped produced by F.I.V. Edoardo Bianchi
- Snark (linguistic), or snarky, or snarkiness, terms referring to Sarcasm

== See also ==
- Snork (disambiguation)
- Snarf (disambiguation)
