= Snarfing =

Cybercrime

Snarf is a term used by computer programmers and the UNIX community meaning to copy a file or data over a network, for any purpose, with additional specialist meanings to access data without appropriate permission. It also refers to using command line tools to transfer files through the HTTP, gopher, finger, and FTP protocols without user interaction, and to a method of achieving cache coherence in a multiprocessing computer architecture through observation of writes to cached data.

== Example ==
An example of a snarf is the Evil twin attack, using a simple shell script running software like AirSnarf to create a wireless hotspot complete with a captive portal. Wireless clients that associate to a snarf access point will receive an IP, DNS, and gateway and appear completely normal. Users will have all of their DNS queries resolve to the attacker's IP number, regardless of their DNS settings, so any website they attempt to visit will bring up a snarf "splash page", requesting a username and password. The username and password entered by unsuspecting users will be mailed to root@localhost. The reason this works is:

1. Legitimate access points can be impersonated and/or drowned out by rogue access points, and
2. Users without a means to validate the authenticity of access points will nevertheless give up their hotspot credentials when asked for them

== See also ==
- Bluejacking
- Bluesnarfing
- Pod slurping
