= Profit and Loss =

Profit and Loss or profit and loss may refer to:

- Profit and loss statement, a statement that indicates how net revenue is transformed into net income

== Media ==
- Profit & Loss, a business magazine
- "Profit and Loss" (Star Trek: Deep Space Nine), an episode of the television series
- Profit and the Loss, a British silent film

== See also ==
- Net income
- Profit (disambiguation)
- Loss (disambiguation)
