= P51 =

The North American P-51 Mustang is an American World War II fighter aircraft.

P51 or P-51 may also refer to:

== Vessels ==
- ARA Bouchard (P-51), a patrol vessel of the Argentine Navy
- HMS Unseen (P51), a submarine of the Royal Navy
- INS Subhadra (P51), a patrol vessel of the Indian Navy
- LÉ Róisín (P51), a patrol vessel of the Irish Naval Service
- Maltese patrol boat P51

== Other uses ==
- P51, short destination for the rifled musket Pattern 1851 Enfield
- BenQ-Siemens P51, a PDA smartphone
- P-51 can opener, a larger version of the P-38 can opener issued by the United States Armed Forces
- Papyrus 51, a biblical manuscript
- Parker 51, a fountain pen
- P51, a state regional road in Latvia
- ThinkPad P51, a laptop in the ThinkPad P Series
