= Snork =

Snork may refer to:

- Snorks, a comic book, and later a cartoon series that began in the mid 80's and ended by the late 80's.
- Snork Maiden, a member of the species known as Snorks and a character in the writings and illustrations of Tove Jansson
- Snork, a member of the species known as Snorks and a character in the writings and illustrations of Tove Jansson. Brother of Snork Maiden.
- Snork, an English/Belgian punk/prog rock band fronted by Elle Revel who played the 2013 GU1 festival in protest at the alleged "corporate takeover" of Guilfest

See also

- Snark (disambiguation)
