= Evil twin (wireless networks) =

Method used to facilitate phishing

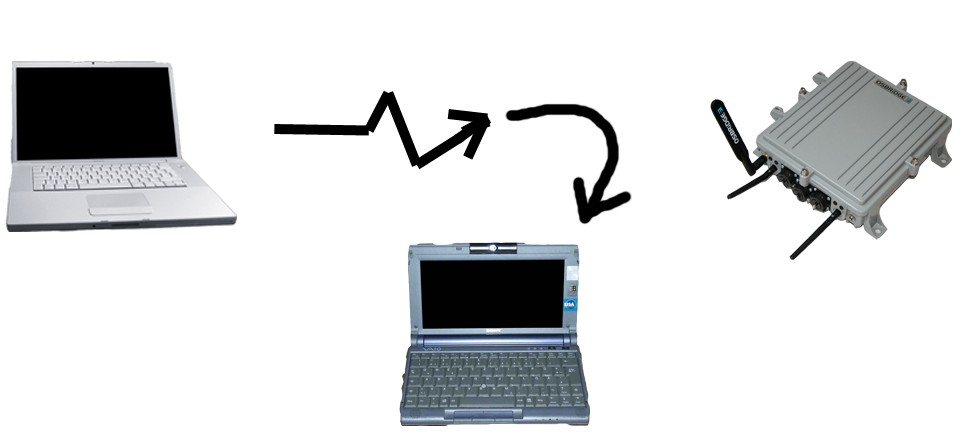

An evil twin is a fraudulent Wi-Fi access point that appears to be legitimate but is set up to eavesdrop on wireless communications.

This type of attack, a kind of man-in-the-middle attack, may be used to steal the passwords of unsuspecting users, either by monitoring their connections or by phishing, which involves setting up a fraudulent web site and luring people there.

== Method ==
The attacker snoops on Internet traffic using a bogus wireless access point. Unwitting web users may be invited to log into the attacker's server, prompting them to enter sensitive information such as usernames and passwords. Often, users are unaware they have been defrauded until well after the incident has occurred.

When users log into unsecured (non-HTTPS) bank or e-mail accounts, the attacker intercepts the transaction, since it is sent through their equipment. The attacker is also able to connect to other networks associated with the users' credentials.

Fake access points are set up by configuring a wireless card to act as an access point. They are hard to trace since they can be shut off instantly. The counterfeit access point may be given the same SSID and BSSID as a nearby Wi-Fi network. The evil twin can be configured to pass Internet traffic through to the legitimate access point while monitoring the victim's connection, or it can simply say the system is temporarily unavailable after obtaining a username and password.

== Using captive portals ==
One of the most commonly used attacks under evil twins is a captive portal. At first, the attacker would create a fake wireless access point that has a similar ESSID to the legitimate access point. The attacker then might execute a denial-of-service attack on the legitimate access point which will cause it to go offline. From then on, clients would connect to the fake access point automatically. The clients would then be led to a web portal that will be requesting them to enter their password, which can then be misused by the attackers.

== Example ==
In July 2024 a man was charged by Australian Federal Police with running a fake WiFi network to steal credentials of passengers on at least one commercial flight. An airline had reported that employees had concerns about a suspicious WiFi network identified during a domestic flight.

== See also ==
- KARMA attack, a variant on the evil twin attack
- Snarfing
- Wireless LAN Security
