= Snarf =

Snarf, SNARF, or their variants may refer to:

== Arts, entertainment, and media ==
- Snarf, an underground comic published in the early 1970s by Denis Kitchen
- Snarf (ThunderCats), one of several characters on the television show ThunderCats
- Snarf (Trollz), a character from the animated television series Trollz
- Snarf, the main character from SnarfQuest, a comic that ran from 1985 to 1989 in Dragon magazine
- Snarf's Sandwiches a chain of sandwich restaurants headquartered in Denver, Colorado.

== Other uses ==
- Snarfing, a term used in computing to copy files over a network for any purpose, and in some contexts may mean illegal copying
- SNARF-1, or Seminaphtharhodafluor, a fluorescent dye that changes colour with pH

== See also ==
- Smarf
- Smurf
