= BenQ-Siemens P51 =

Smartphone model

BenQ-Siemens P51 is a Windows Mobile 5.0 PDA smartphone developed by BenQ Mobile. It comes with an array of wireless connectivity including a built-in GPS receiver, Bluetooth and Wi-Fi. Like the BenQ P50 before it, the P51 took long to market - it was announced in March 2006 but was only first available in November 2006 in China, and March 2007 in Singapore and Turkey.

The next BenQ Windows Mobile device platform would be the BenQ E72 is the bar form factor without touch screen, had run on Windows Mobile 6.1 Standards (Smartphone Edition). It was released in 2010.

== Specification sheet ==
Feature	Specification
Form factor	Candybar
Operating System	Windows Mobile Version 5.0
Screen	TFT touchscreen, 256K colors, QVGA, diagonal 2.8"
Size	122 x 60 x 20 mm, 130 cc
CPU	ARM920T PXA27x 400 MHz
Internal Dynamic Memory (RAM)	64 MB
Internal Flash Memory (ROM)	128 MB
Camera	1.3-megapixel
Video recording	yes, QVGA (320x240)
Memory card slot	Yes, SDIO/MMC
GPS	Yes
Bluetooth	Yes
Wi-Fi	Yes
Infrared	No
Data cable support	Yes, mini USB port
Email	Yes (ActiveSync, POP3, IMAP4 and SMTP, with SSL/TLS)
Music player	Yes
Radio	No
Video Player	Yes
Polyphonic tones	Yes, 64 chords
Ringtones	Yes, MP3/WMA
HF speakerphone	Yes, with 2.5 mm audio jack
Offline mode	Yes
Battery	1370 mAh)
Talk time	up to 4 h
Standby time	up to 150 hours
