= Insider threat =

Perceived risk originating from within an organization

An insider threat is a perceived threat to an organization that comes from people within the organization, such as employees, former employees, contractors or business associates, who have inside information concerning the organization's security practices, data and computer systems. The threat may involve fraud, the theft of confidential or commercially valuable information, the theft of intellectual property, or the sabotage of computer systems.

== Overview ==
Insiders have legitimate access to computer systems and are often familiar with the organization's data and intellectual property. Thus Insider threats are harder to defend against than attacks from outsiders.

== Research ==
The CERT Coordination Center at Carnegie-Mellon University maintains the CERT Insider Threat Center, which includes a database of more than 850 cases of insider threats, including instances of fraud, theft and sabotage; the database is used for research and analysis.

=== Findings ===
In the 2022 Data Breach Investigations Report (DBIR), Verizon found that 82% of breaches involved the human element, noting that employees continue to play a leading role in cybersecurity incidents and breaches.

According to the UK Information Commissioners Office, 90% of all breaches reported to them in 2019 were the result of mistakes made by end users. This was up from 61% and 87% over the previous two years.

A 2018 whitepaper reported that 53% of companies surveyed had confirmed insider attacks against their organization in the previous 12 months, with 27% saying insider attacks have become more frequent.

A report published in July 2012 on the insider threat in the U.S. financial sector gives some statistics on insider threat incidents: 80% of the malicious acts were committed at work during working hours; 81% of the perpetrators planned their actions beforehand; 33% of the perpetrators were described as "difficult" and 17% as being "disgruntled". The insider was identified in 74% of cases. Financial gain was a motive in 81% of cases, revenge in 23% of cases, and 27% of the people carrying out malicious acts were in financial difficulties at the time.

The US Department of Defense Personnel Security Research Center published a report that describes approaches for detecting insider threats. Earlier it published ten case studies of insider attacks by information technology professionals.

== Typologies and ontologies ==
Multiple classification systems and ontologies have been proposed to classify insider threats.

Traditional models of insider threat identify three broad categories:

- Malicious insiders, which are people who take advantage of their access to inflict harm on an organization;
- Negligent insiders, which are people who make errors and disregard policies, which place their organizations at risk; and
- Infiltrators, who are external actors that obtain legitimate access credentials without authorization.

== Criticisms ==
Insider threat research has been criticized.

- Critics have argued that insider threat is a poorly defined concept.
- Forensically investigating insider data theft is notoriously difficult, and requires novel techniques such as stochastic forensics.
- Data supporting insider threat is generally proprietary (i.e., encrypted data).
- Theoretical/conceptual models of insider threat are often based on loose interpretations of research in the behavioral and social sciences, using "deductive principles and intuitions of subject matter expert."

Adopting sociotechnical approaches, researchers have also argued for the need to consider insider threat from the perspective of social systems. Jordan Schoenherr said that "surveillance requires an understanding of how sanctioning systems are framed, how employees will respond to surveillance, what workplace norms are deemed relevant, and what ‘deviance’ means, e.g., deviation for a justified organization norm or failure to conform to an organizational norm that conflicts with general social values." By treating all employees as potential insider threats, organizations might create conditions that lead to insider threats.

== See also ==
- Computer security
- Mole (espionage)
- Naval Criminal Investigative Service
- Threat (computer security)
- Confidence trick
- Graft (politics)
- Shrinkage (accounting)
- Return fraud
