= Siemens SL55 =

2003 mobile phone by Siemens Mobile

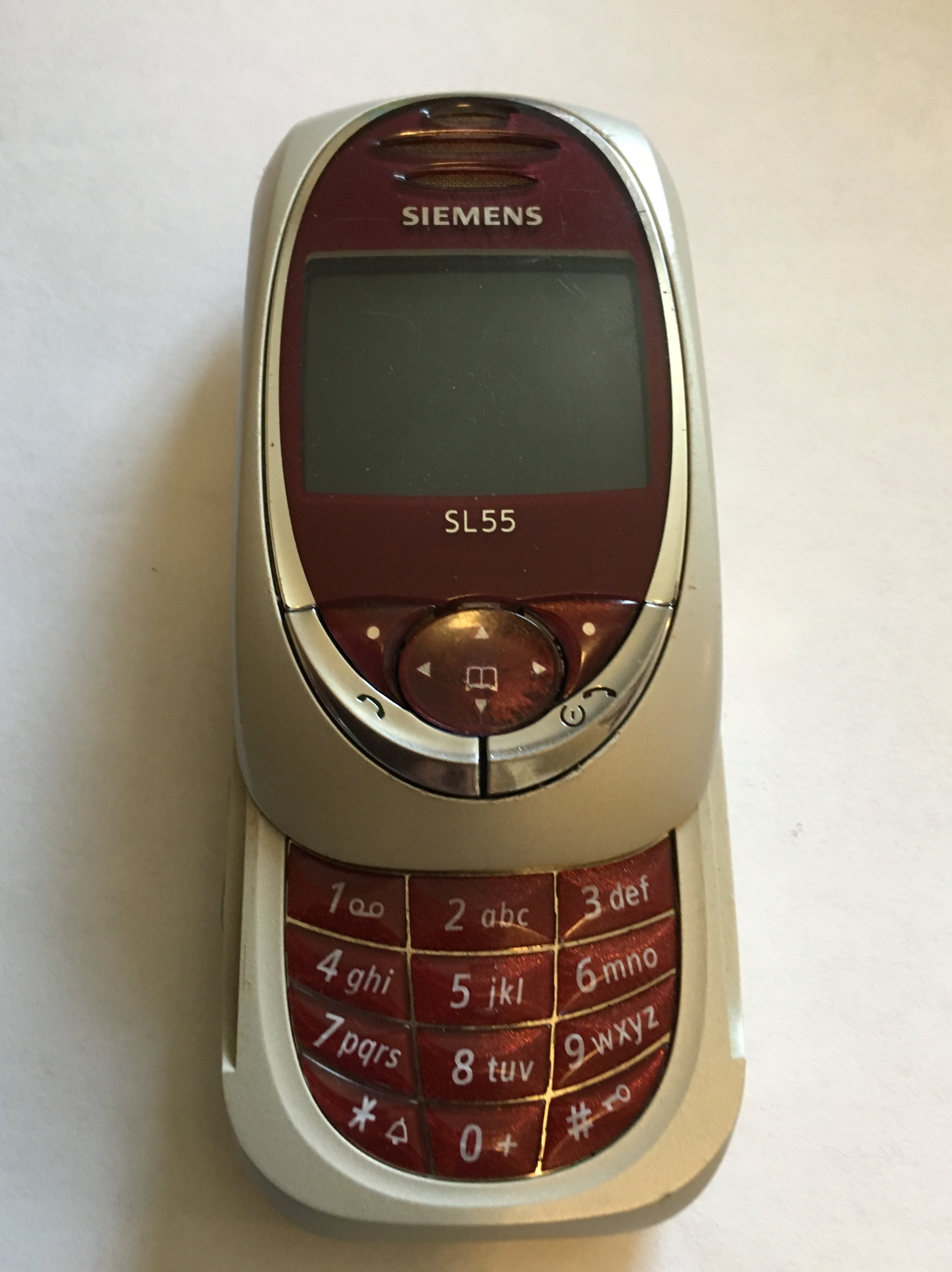
- Manufacturer: Siemens
- Availability by region: Q2 2003
- Compatible networks: GSM tri-band
- Form factor: Slider
- Dimensions: 82×45×22 mm (3.23×1.77×0.87 in)
- Weight: 79 g (3 oz)
- Storage: 1.6 MB
- Battery: 500 mAh LiPo
- Display: 101x80 px
- Connectivity: IrDA

The Siemens SL55 is a slider mobile phone released by Siemens in 2003. The phone has a sliding design, and features a WAP browser, Java support and T9 predictive typing. Camera functionality can be added by connecting the clip-on cam. The colours it was available in were ruby and titan. The Siemens SL56, is a variant of the SL55 designed for the American market. Unlike the SL55, the SL56 is a dualband phone.

== Features ==
- Display
  - 101x80 px resolution
  - Colour, 12-bit colour depth
  - Can display up to 7 lines of text
  - Customizable colour scheme, wallpaper, screensavers
- Battery
  - 500 mAh lithium polymer battery
  - Up to 3.5 hours of talk time, 200 hours standby time
- Connectivity
  - Infrared sensor
  - WAP 1.2.1 mobile web browser
  - EMS, SMS, MMS, e-mail (POP3, IMAP)
  - Triband EGSM 900, GSM 1800/1900
  - GPRS class 8 data technology
  - PC synchronization software
- Storage
  - 1.6 MB of storage
  - Call records: 10 dialed, 10 received, 10 missed calls
  - Up to 500 phonebook entries
- Camera
  - Can be used via the clip-on camera
  - 640x480 resolution
- Sound
  - Polyphonic ringtones
  - Ringtone composer
  - Voice memos, 20 voice commands, 20 voice dial numbers
- Other features
  - User profiles
  - Call records and address book
  - 2 pre-installed games (Rayman Golf and Mobile Tennis), more can be downloaded
  - Calendar, alarm, clock, stopwatch, timer, notes, to-do list, reminders
  - Unit and currency converter, calculator
  - Java MIDP 1.0 support
  - SMS templates
  - SyncML support
  - Conference calling, loudspeaker

== Reception ==
Reviewers praised its compact size and considered the rounded form of the device to be interesting. The quality of the screen was considered to be average, and its keyboard to be comfortable to type on. The reviewers liked the features and ease of use of the device, the fashion design, and that it had many features for its compact size, but didn't like the slow application loading speeds, the storage, and the clip-on camera, saying that the viewfinder of the camera is inaccurate, and the photo processing speed is slow.

== Gallery ==
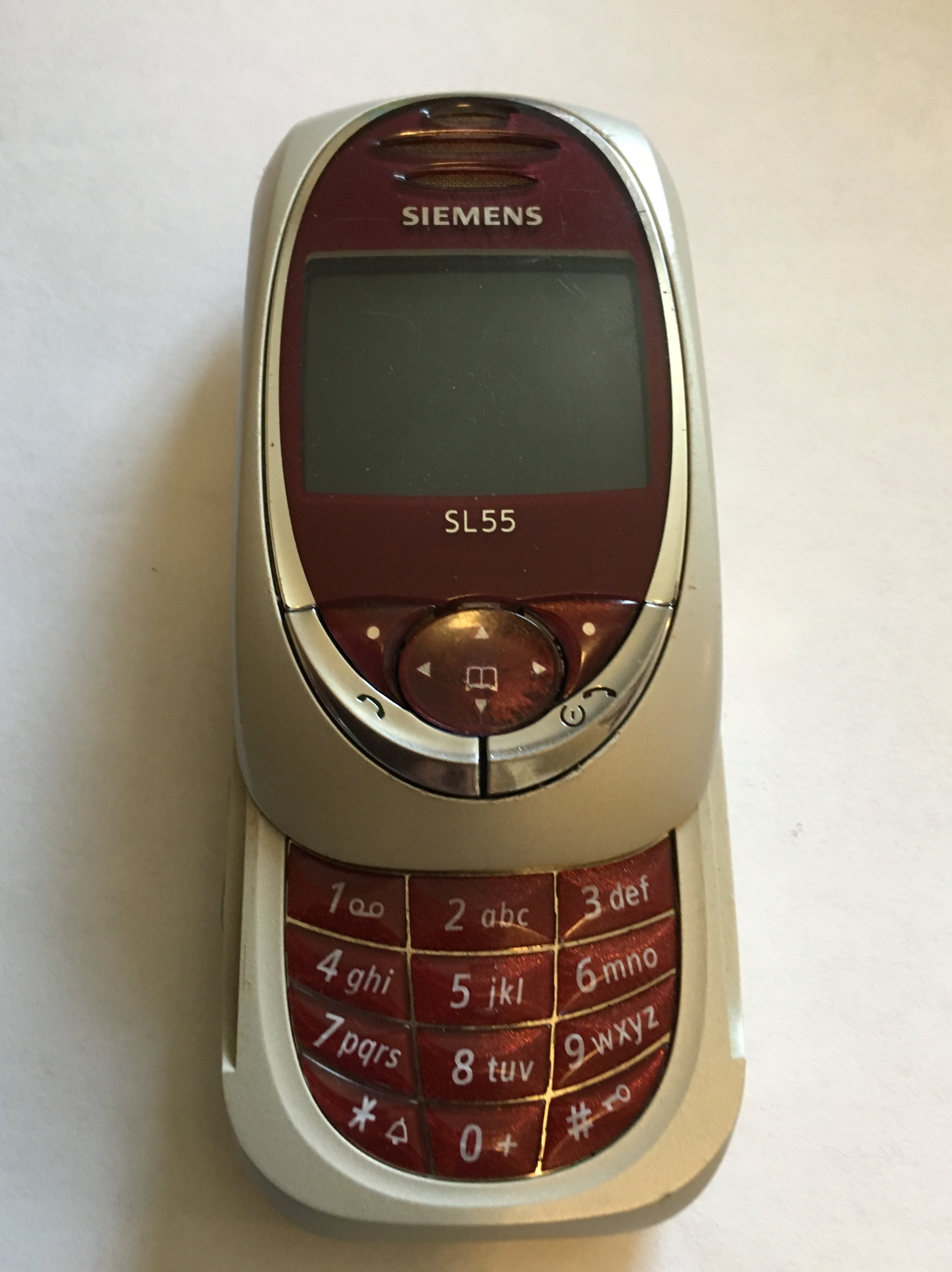
The Siemens SL55 in open position.

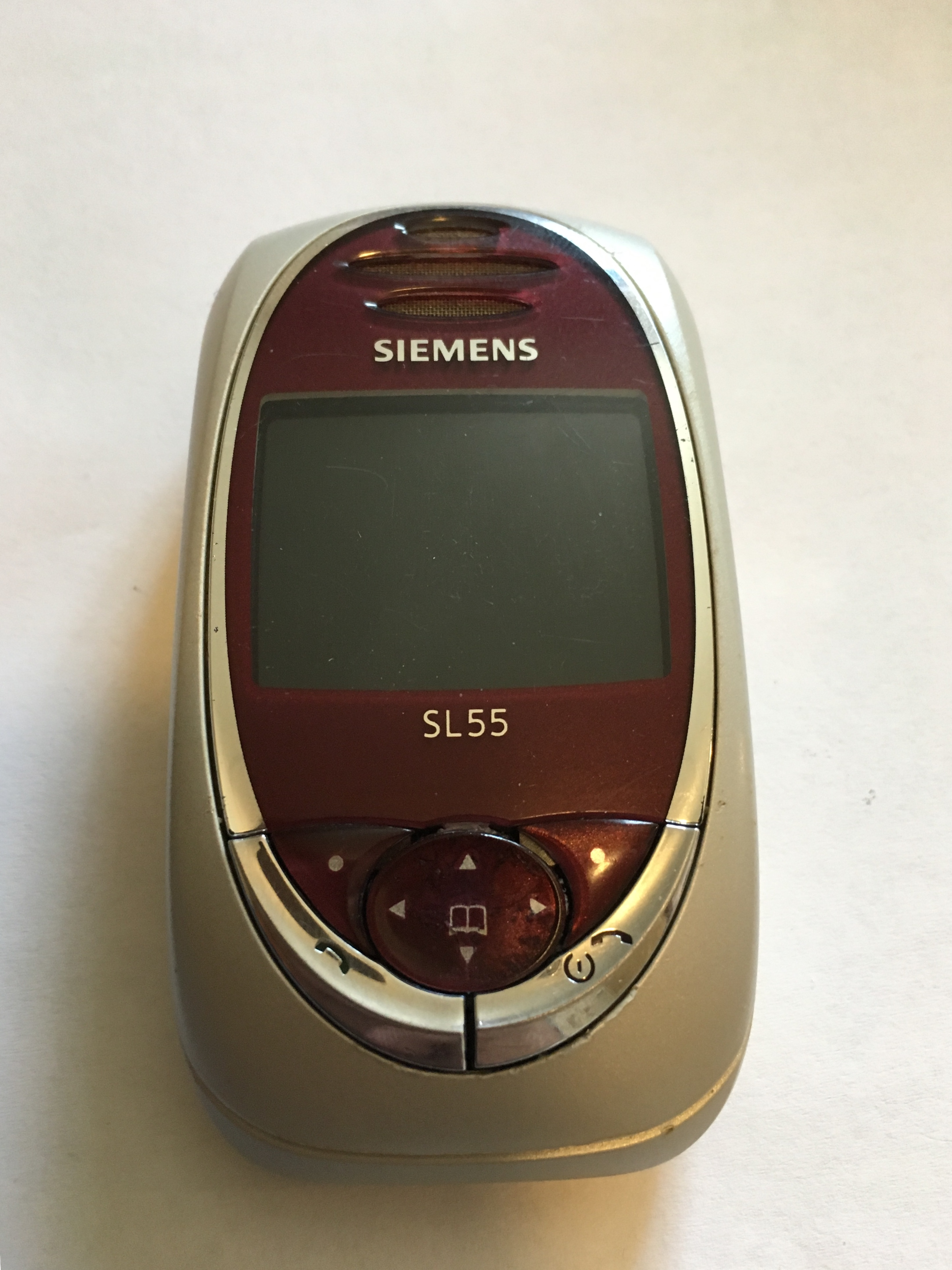
The Siemens SL55 in closed position.
