= BenQ S500 =

Mobile phone model

- Manufacturer: BenQ Corporation
- Availability by region: 2006
- Compatible networks: GSM Tri-band
- Form factor: Clamshell
- Battery: 3.7V 840 mAh Li-Ion
- Rear camera: 1.3 Megapixels
- Display: 176 x 224 TFT LCD
- External display: 96 x 96 LCD
- Connectivity: IrDA, USB
- Data inputs: Keypad, Navigation key (up, down, left, right)

The BenQ S500 is a mobile phone announced by BenQ in 2005. It has a SXGA (1.3 Megapixels) camera with flash (50/60 Hz). It also has an MP3 player that can be launched by pressing and holding the 'play' button, which is located at the side of the phone. The user can also see which song is being played and the elapsed time even when the phone is not flipped open.
