= BenQ Mobile =

Taiwanese mobile phone company

- Type: Subsidiary
- Industry: Communications
- Predecessor: Siemens Mobile
- Founded: 1 October 2005
- Defunct: 30 January 2007 (BenQ-branded mobile handsets have been produced again since 2008 by BenQ Corporation in Taiwan and Asian markets)
- Fate: Bankruptcy
- Headquarters: Munich, Germany, Taipei, Taiwan
- Key people: Clemens Joos, CEO; Jerry Wang, EVP and CMO; Alex Liou, Head of Corporate Finance; Irwin Chen, Member of the Board
- Products: Mobile phones, PDA, Smartphone
- Brands: Siemens (until 2006); BenQ Mobile (until 2006); BenQ-Siemens (2006-2007); BenQ (2008-present)
- Total assets: US$775 million
- Number of employees: ~3,000
- Parent: BenQ Corporation
- Website: www.benqmobile.com

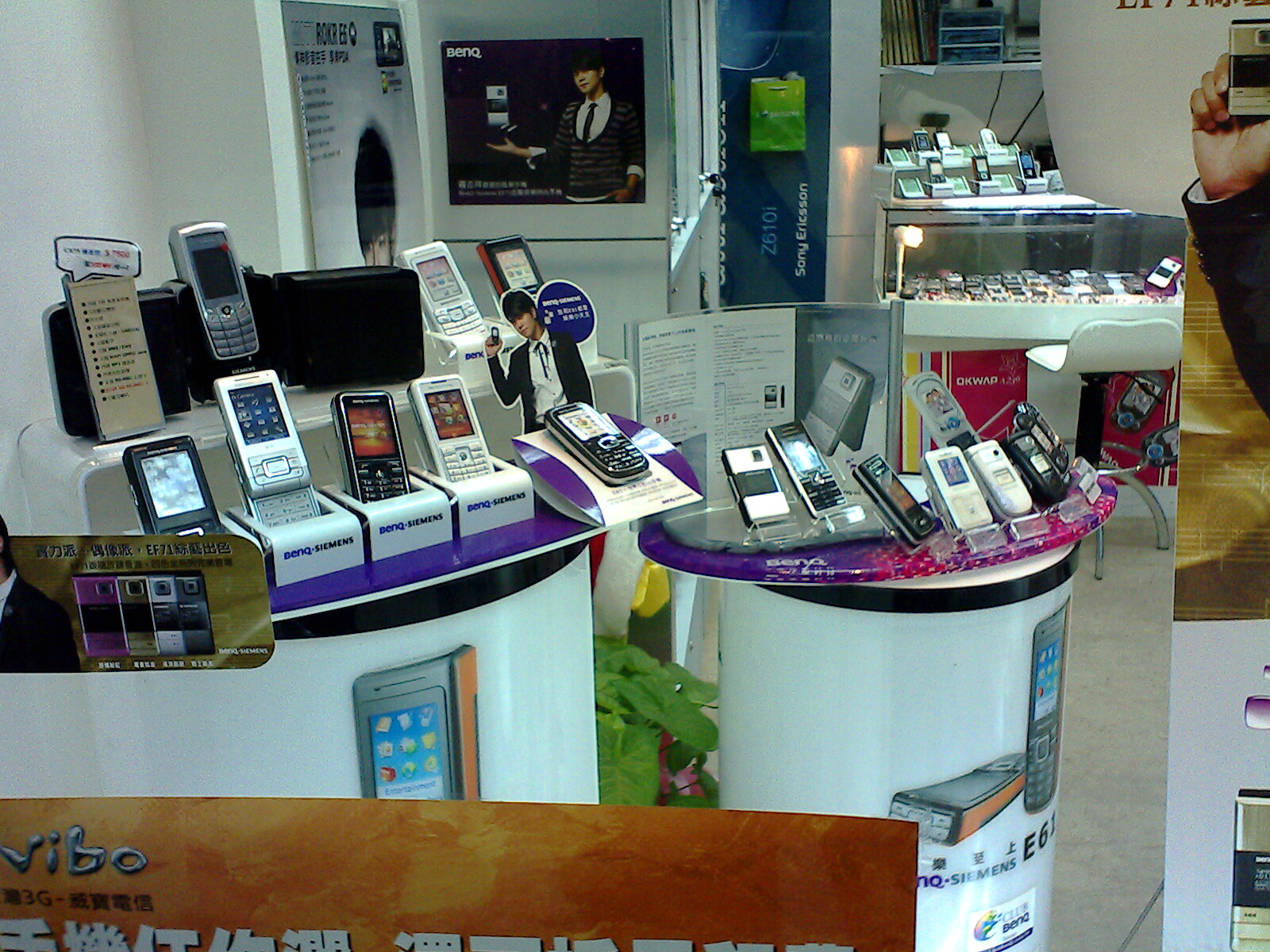
BenQ-Siemens store

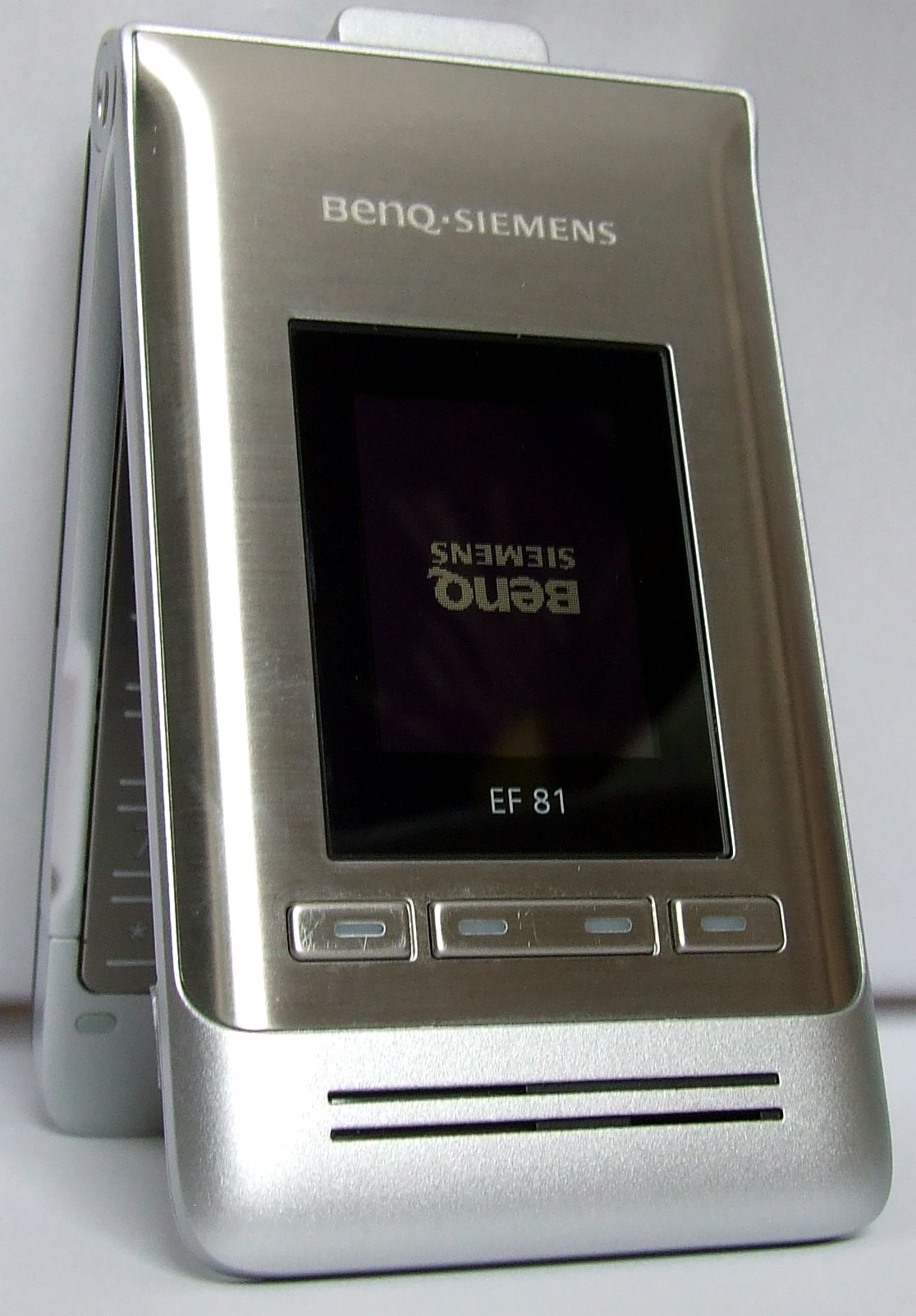
BenQ-Siemens EF81

BenQ Mobile GmbH & Co. OHG was the mobile communications subsidiary of Taiwanese BenQ Corporation, selling products under the BenQ-Siemens brand. The group, based in Munich, Germany, was formed out of BenQ's acquisition of the then struggling Siemens Mobile group in 2005. The newly formed company won the most iF product design awards in 2006 and also won many design awards in Germany's Red Dot competition. BenQ Mobile failed later that year.

== History ==
Siemens Mobile was loss-making and struggling in the market, and the division was then sold to BenQ Corporation in June 2005 to try to turn the business around. As part of the deal, Siemens would pay BenQ at least 250 million euros to get the new venture to a solid start, in return of a 2.5% stake in BenQ. The acquisition was completed on 1 October 2005, with the formation of BenQ Mobile, led by a German CEO, Clemens Joos, and a Taiwanese chairman, Jerry Wang. Joos had already been president of Siemens Mobile since 2004.

Part of the reason why BenQ was chosen by Siemens was the Taiwanese company's interest to keep German locations open - the headquarters in Munich and the manufacturing plants in Kamp-Lintfort and in Bocholt. Other research and development and manufacturing plants were located in Aalborg, Beijing, Suzhou, Ulm (also in Germany), Manaus, Mexicali, Taipei and Wrocław. Before the acquisition BenQ was already making mobile phones – including two Symbian UIQ smartphone models and one Windows Mobile smartphone model.

BenQ's first mobile phone was the M775C, which was released in 2003. During Q1 2004, eight new phones were announced, ranging from bar and clamshell phones to Windows Mobile smartphones. A further seven phones, mainly clamshells, such as the BenQ S500, came in 2005.

Logo of BenQ-Siemens

On 17 January 2006, the first handsets under the new BenQ-Siemens brand were launched: the EF81, a slim clamshell phone similar to the Motorola RAZR; the S68, a premium light and compact candybar phone targeting business users, being the successor of the SP65, and S88, a multimedia device with a 2-megapixel camera.

In February 2006, the EF51 model was launched featuring music buttons on the front with a flip-down design that reveals a keypad. BenQ Mobile introduced the BenQ-Siemens P51 in March, a Windows Mobile 5.0 device and the only smartphone the company would release.

=== BenQ Siemens ===
On 1 October 2005, BenQ Corp. acquired the mobile devices division of Germany's Siemens AG, becoming the sixth-largest company in the mobile phone industry by accumulated market share. The acquisition results in a new business group, BenQ Mobile, of BenQ Corporation entirely dedicated to wireless communications. Mobile phones of the new group are marketed under a new brand, BenQ-Siemens.

In late September 2006, the mobile devices division of BenQ, BenQ Mobile (Germany), announced bankruptcy when BenQ Corp. discontinued its funding. As a result, BenQ Mobile was placed under the supervision of a state-appointed bankruptcy administrator. In February 2007, BenQ Mobile was finally disbanded as a suitable buyer could not be found. An estimated 2000 BenQ Mobile employees lost their jobs. On 24 August 2006 BenQ announced plans to spin off its manufacturing operations in early 2007, separating contract manufacturing and own-brand divisions.

=== After Siemens ===
After BenQ-Siemens, BenQ continued to make phones, primarily aimed at the Asian market (although one was also released in Europe).

This is a list of BenQ phones during the post-BenQ-Siemens brands period between 2009 and 2012:

- BenQ T33
- BenQ T51
- BenQ C30 (BenQ-Siemens C31)
- BenQ E72 (Windows Mobile smartphone; also released in Europe) (not an E71 successor)
- BenQ M7 (BenQ-Siemens M81 spirituality success's)
- BenQ T60
- BenQ E53
- BenQ C36 (BenQ-Siemens C31 successor)
- BenQ E55
- BenQ MOMODESIGN MD300H (HSDPA) (This is a co-brands in exclusively project of gadgets for MOMODESIGN, the most rarest model of BenQ Mobile because the phone was made available in limited quantities volumes not over 5,000 units.)

After a hiatus, BenQ resumed production of smartphones under its own brand in 2013.

Smartphones

Dell Venue Pro

Qisda Corporation, the parent company of BenQ, manufactured smartphones for Dell, which were marketed under the Venue Pro name, and which ran Windows Phone 7. The phone was made available in limited quantities on 8 November 2010 with the launch of Windows Phone. Delivery of the phone met severe setbacks, it was rife with numerous hardware issues, and the device was discontinued as of 8 March 2012.

Android

List of Android devices made by BenQ:

- BenQ A3 — made for the Asian market, runs Android 4.1 Jelly Bean
- BenQ T3
- BenQ F5 RAM 2GB, runs Android 4.4.2 KitKat

EE (UK)

Starting in 2015 BenQ manufactured the Harrier and Harrier Mini Android Smartphones for the UK mobile telecoms provider EE.

=== Collapse ===
The company ended up making huge losses, with parent BenQ losing $1 billion (€840 million) from the acquisition to September 2006, and its share price dropping by 45 percent. BenQ Mobile only had a global 2.4% market share as of Q3 2006, demonstrating its failure to turn the business around in its first year. In September, it was announced that its factories in Mexico and Taiwan would halt production.

BenQ Mobile filed for bankruptcy in a Munich court on 29 September 2006, a day after its parent BenQ decided to stop funding the unit. This sparked a debate in Germany over whether BenQ only acquired the Siemens mobile division for its patents and intellectual property, and that it did not intend to continue manufacturing mobile phones in Germany. The bankruptcy caused outrage in Germany over the possible thousands of job losses, with chancellor Angela Merkel having said that Siemens is responsible for the BenQ Mobile (i.e. former Siemens Mobile) employees who are at risk. Siemens set up a 35 million euros fund for the employees. Siemens stopped payment still owed to BenQ related to the original acquisition on 5 October and considered taking legal action against BenQ about the future use of the brand and patents, although no claim would be made. Siemens was heavily criticised by some German politicians and labour unions for mismanagement that led to the bankruptcy under subsequent BenQ ownership. A BenQ executive said that stopping funds for the Mobile subsidiary and forcing it into insolvency protection was a "really tough decision" and not as easy as "just walking away" as was reported by some media outlets.

2,000 employees were laid off in late October 2006.

A scandal investigation was launched into Siemens's and BenQ's roles in the bankruptcy of BenQ Mobile amid allegations that financial offences were committed. As of March 2007, 13 executives, including Eric Yu, were detained in Taiwan accused of selling their shares in BenQ before the announcement knowing about the bankruptcy filing. Shares in BenQ fell 7% to its lowest level in ten years. BenQ CEO K.Y. Lee was also detained a month later. At the same time Siemens was facing wide allegations in Germany of internal corruption and bribery not necessarily related to BenQ Mobile.

After no suitable investors or buyers were found for the business, BenQ Mobile's insolvency administrator, Martin Prager, said on 2 January 2007 that the company would have to shut down. On 30 January the BenQ Mobile factory in Kamp-Lintfort closed. Representatives of the labour union IG Metall bid farewell to the last 165 workers with flowers. The demise of BenQ Mobile caused 3,000 employees to lose their jobs. The company's assets were auctioned off in Hamburg and at eBay in March 2007 and in June.

The losses of 2005 and 2006, wiped out all profits BenQ had made since 1999.

=== Aftermath ===
Martin Prager launched a 26-million-euro lawsuit against its former parent BenQ in August 2007 on top of 80 million euros already claimed. The lawsuit was partly for BenQ bonus payments promised to BenQ Mobile employees in Germany that were paid by the BenQ Mobile subsidiary. In July 2008, Prager threatened a multi-million euro lawsuit against Siemens after claiming irregularities were found in the acquisition and that BenQ Mobile was already insolvent as early as May 2006 - a claim first reported by German newspaper Die Welt. A settlement between Prager and Siemens was reached in November 2008.

Former BenQ CEO K. Y. Lee, along with several executives including Eric Yu and Sheaffer Lee, were cleared of their insider trading, embezzlement and forgery charges in August 2009, after a two-year trial.

After the company closed, its former parent company, BenQ, launched five new phones (produced in Asia) under the BenQ-Siemens brand during 2007 (the license still ran for another four years). These include the A53 (Taiwan only), E52, C31, C32 and SF71 – briefly continuing the lifespan of the BenQ-Siemens brand. In August 2007, BenQ announced that it would resume production of mobile devices using its own "BenQ" brand, coming with the announcements of the BenQ E72, M7 and T51 models that would initially launch in Taiwan. BenQ started making Android devices from 2013.

== List of mobile phones ==
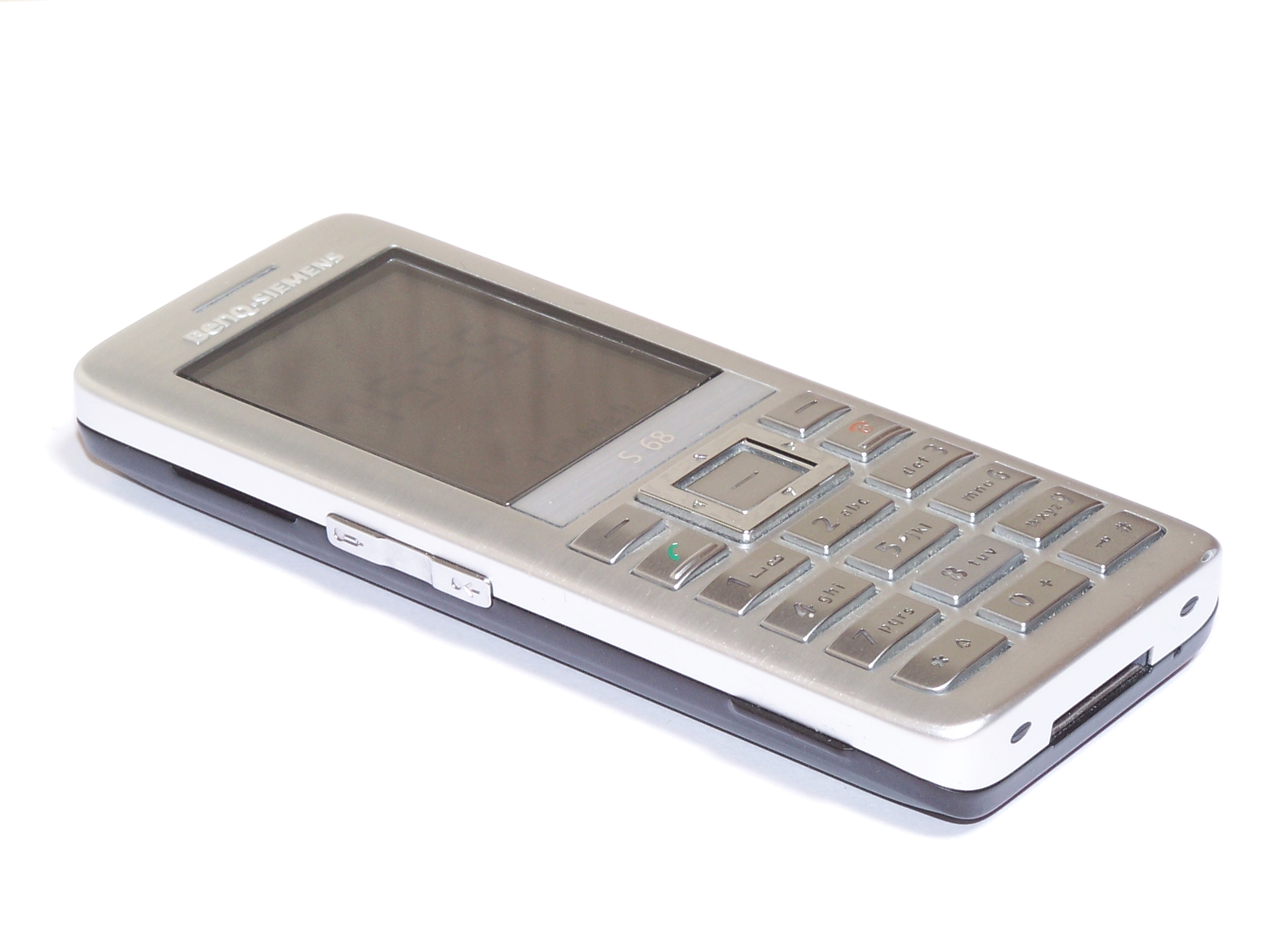
BenQ-Siemens S68

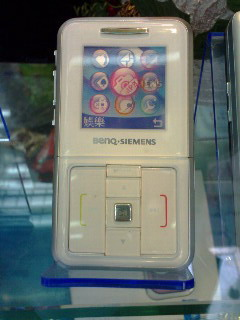
BenQ-Siemens EF51

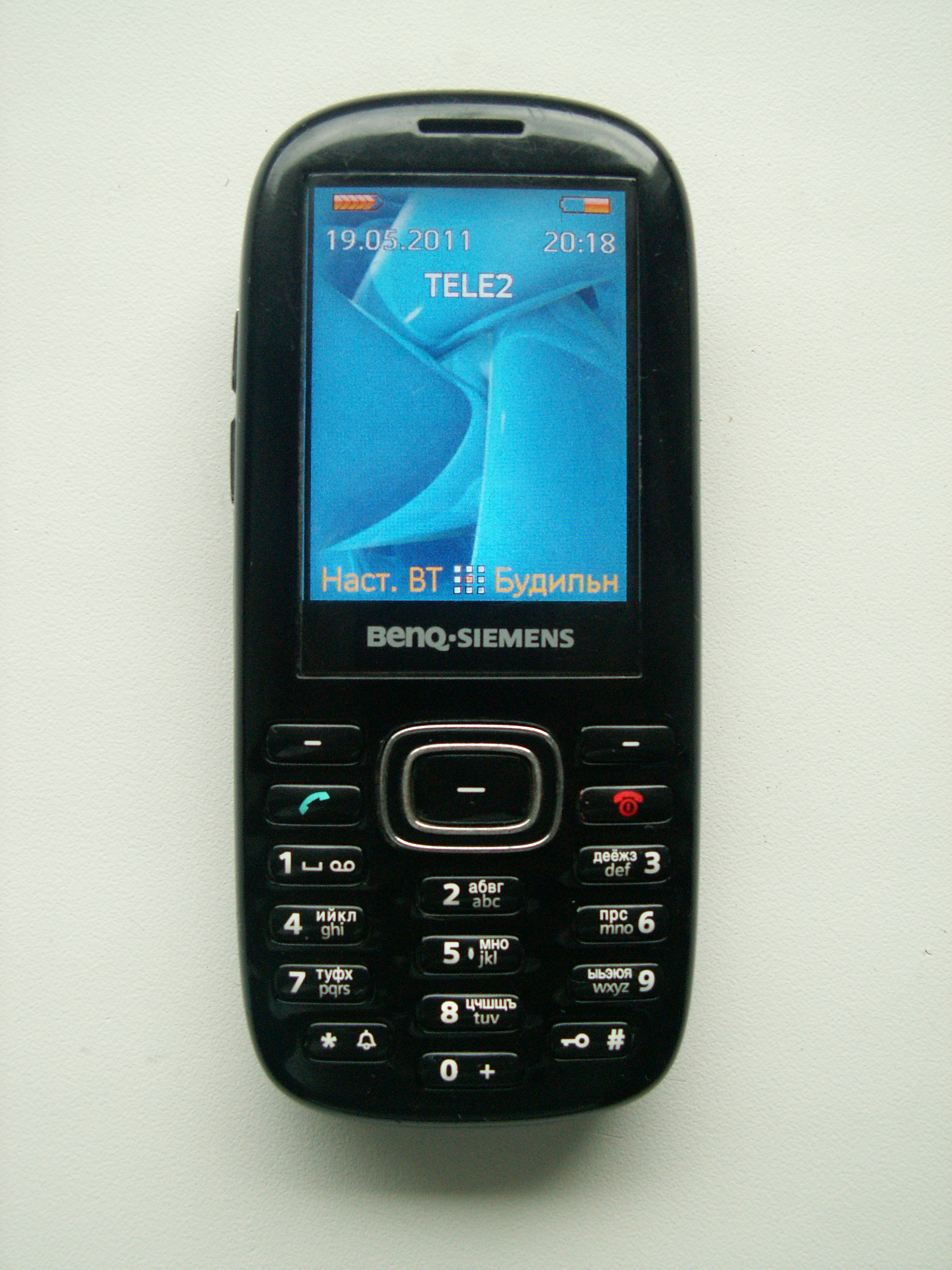
BenQ-Siemens E71

- BenQ-Siemens A38
- BenQ-Siemens A58 (cancelled)
- BenQ-Siemens AL26/AL26 Hello Kitty!
- BenQ-Siemens C26 (not presented)
- BenQ-Siemens C31 (Low-Entry version of BenQ-Siemens E81)
- BenQ-Siemens C52 (not presented)
- BenQ-Siemens C81 (Siemens C75 Successors)
- BenQ-Siemens CF61 (MIA Special Edition called EF61)
- BenQ-Siemens CL61 (not presented)
- BenQ-Siemens CL71 Slides
- BenQ-Siemens E52 (Siemens ST55/60 Successors)
- BenQ-Siemens E61 Q-Fi
- BenQ-Siemens E71 (Siemens ME75 Successors, others called BenQ-Siemens E80)
- BenQ-Siemens EL71
- BenQ-Siemens EF71
- BenQ-Siemens EF51 Q-Fi (BenQ Z2 Successors)
- BenQ-Siemens EF61 MIA Special Edition, Blue Whisper Color (regular version is called BenQ-Siemens CF61)
- BenQ-Siemens E80 (prototype, public model in BenQ-Siemens E71)
- BenQ-Siemens E81 (Asia market's only)
- BenQ-Siemens EF81 (Siemens SLV140)
- BenQ-Siemens EF82 (not presented, BenQ-Siemens EF81 Successors)
- BenQ-Siemens EF91 (BenQ-Siemens EF81/82 Successors)
- BenQ-Siemens M81 (Siemens M75 Successors)
- BenQ-Siemens P51(BenQ P50 Successors)
- BenQ-Siemens S65-DVBH/ SXX65-DVBH (not presented)
- BenQ-Siemens S68 (Siemens SP65 Successors, The best-selling of BenQ-Siemens phone)
- BenQ-Siemens S81 (pictured) (Siemens S65 Successors)
- BenQ-Siemens S88 (New lineup developed by BenQ)
- BenQ-Siemens SF71 (not presented in Europe, Siemens SF65 Successors)
- BenQ-Siemens SL80 (Siemens SL75/SL7C)
- BenQ-Siemens SL91 (cancelled, Siemens SL80 Successors)
- BenQ-Siemens SL98 (not presented)

== Sponsorships ==
BenQ sponsored the Real Madrid CF football club following the signing of a four-year deal. The BenQ-Siemens name appeared on the shirts of Real Madrid in the 2006-2007 season, but the company's collapse meant that the sponsorship only lasted one season.
