= Data theft =

Theft of electronic information

Data theft is the unauthorized duplication or deletion of an organization's electronic information.

Data theft is a growing phenomenon primarily caused by system administrators and office workers with access to technology such as database servers, desktop computers and a growing list of hand-held devices capable of storing digital information, such as USB flash drives, iPods and even digital cameras. Since employees often spend a considerable amount of time developing contacts, confidential, and copyrighted information for the company they work for, they may feel they have some right to the information and are inclined to copy or delete part of it when they leave the company, or misuse it while they are still in employment. Information can be sold and bought and then used by criminals and criminal organizations. Alternatively, an employee may choose to deliberately abuse trusted access to information for the purpose of exposing misconduct by the employer. From the perspective of the society, such an act of whistleblowing can be seen as positive and is protected by law in certain situations in some jurisdictions, such as the United States.

A common scenario is where a sales person makes a copy of the contact database for use in their next job. Typically, this is a clear violation of their terms of employment.

Notable acts of data theft include those by leaker Chelsea Manning and self-proclaimed whistleblowers Edward Snowden and Hervé Falciani.

== Data theft methods ==
=== Thumbsucking ===
Thumbsucking, similar to podslurping, is the intentional use of a portable USB mass storage device, such as a USB flash drive (or "thumbdrive"), to illicitly download confidential data from a network endpoint.

A USB flash drive was allegedly used to remove highly classified documents about the design of U.S. nuclear weapons from a vault at Los Alamos without authorization.

The threat of thumbsucking has been amplified for a number of reasons, including the following:

- The storage capacity of portable USB storage devices has increased.
- The cost of high-capacity portable USB storage devices has decreased.
- Networks have grown more dispersed, the number of remote network access points has increased and methods of network connection have expanded, increasing the number of vectors for network infiltration.

== Investigating data theft ==
Techniques to investigate data theft include stochastic forensics, digital artifact analysis (especially of USB drive artifacts), and other computer forensics techniques.

== See also ==
- Pod slurping
- Bluesnarfing
- Sneakernet
- Data breach
