= Siemens M75 =

Mobile phone model

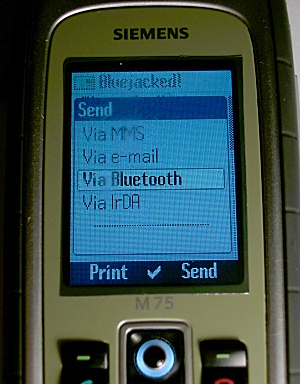
The Siemens M75 (in the safari green color variant) showing the connection via Bluetooth functionality features.

The Siemens M75, this is the successor of Siemens M65. The phone released in 2005, is manufactured by BenQ Mobile. It is one of the few mobile phones to be weather and shock resistant (tested to comply with the IP54 standard), while not skimping on other features like a 1.3MP digital camera, 262k color screen and a digital music player supporting the MP3 and AAC formats. It comes in 2 color variants, safari green and black.

The M75 is a triband cameraphone that can take digital photographs up to 1280x1024 pixels in size. It includes 2.5G technologies, supporting GPRS class 10 connections with WAP 2.0 capability. It supports polyphonic ringtones in MIDI as well as tones in the MP3, AAC(+) and WAV formats. On the mobile gaming side, the phone supports Java ME MIDP 2.0. It has 8.29 MB of onboard memory available for the user, and supports RS-MMC cards for further expansion.

== Features ==
- Triband (supports GSM 900/1800/1900 MHz bands) with GPRS and CSD connects.
- IP54 with Military grade approved
- Dust, Shocks and Water resistance
- Bluetooth and IrDA wireless technologies in the phone.
- Hot-swappable RS-MMC card slot support the maximum capacity 1GB, slotting swaps near Siemens chargers port at the bottom.
- Polyphonic MIDI, WAV, MP3 and AAC(+) ringtones within the Media player menu.
- Dimensions: 110.5 x 51.5 x 20.8 mm (length x width x depth)
- Weight: 110 g
- 132x176 pixels TFT LCD
