= Profit & Loss =

Profit & Loss: In the Currency & Derivative Markets is a monthly business magazine founded by Julie Ros in July 1999 specializing in coverage of foreign exchange and derivative markets. Julie Ros was also the founding editor-in-chief.

Each month, Profit & Loss looks at the changes taking place in the industry - the strategic shifts into new markets and products and the technological advances that are changing the way the FX and derivatives markets function.

The magazine's publisher is P&L Services Ltd, a privately held publishing company based in London.
