= BenQ =

Taiwanese multinational company

BenQ Corporation
- Type: Subsidiary
- Industry: Electronics
- Predecessor: Acer Communication & Multimedia
- Founded: 1984; 42 years ago
- Headquarters: Taipei, Taiwan
- Area served: Worldwide
- Key people: Michael Tseng (曾文祺), Chairman; Peter Huang (黃原福), President
- Revenue: US$25B
- Total assets: US$188M
- Number of employees: 1,700
- Parent: Qisda Corporation

Chinese name
- Traditional Chinese: 明基電通
- Simplified Chinese: 明基电通
Transcriptions
Standard Mandarin
- Hanyu Pinyin: Míngjī Diàntōng

Qisda
- Traditional Chinese: 佳世達科技
- Simplified Chinese: 佳世达科技
Transcriptions
Standard Mandarin
- Hanyu Pinyin: Jiāshìdá kējì
- Website: benq.com <!— Use Wikidata —>

BenQ Corporation (/ˌbɛnˈkjuː/; Chinese: 明基電通股份有限公司) is a Taiwanese multinational company that sells and markets technology products, consumer electronics, computing and communications devices under the brand name BenQ. BenQ's principal product areas include monitors, projectors, interactive displays, lighting, esports equipment, remote work and learning, wireless presentation, and other peripherals.

BenQ's head office is in Taipei, Taiwan, and the company has branch offices worldwide: including in the Asia-Pacific region, Europe, China, Latin America, and North America. Globally, BenQ employs over 1700 individuals. The BenQ brand is commonly seen in retail channels worldwide.

== History ==
BenQ began as a sub-brand within Taiwan's Acer Group in 1984, but has since become independent.

In 2001, BenQ was spun off from Acer to become an independent organization, and by 2006, the two companies were effectively legally separated. The brand name represents the slogan "Bringing Enjoyment 'N' Quality to life".

In 2005, BenQ entered the mobile phone market, in cooperation with Germany's Siemens, as BenQ-Siemens, and later, independently, as BenQ Mobile. However, BenQ left this market by 2015.

BenQ has gradually increased its reputation for products that are affordable, but perform well, with more emphasis on higher-end products, which have won numerous awards.

BenQ today is a subsidiary of a publicly-listed company, Qisda Corporation, a relationship which was established in 2007.

BenQ Corporate logo

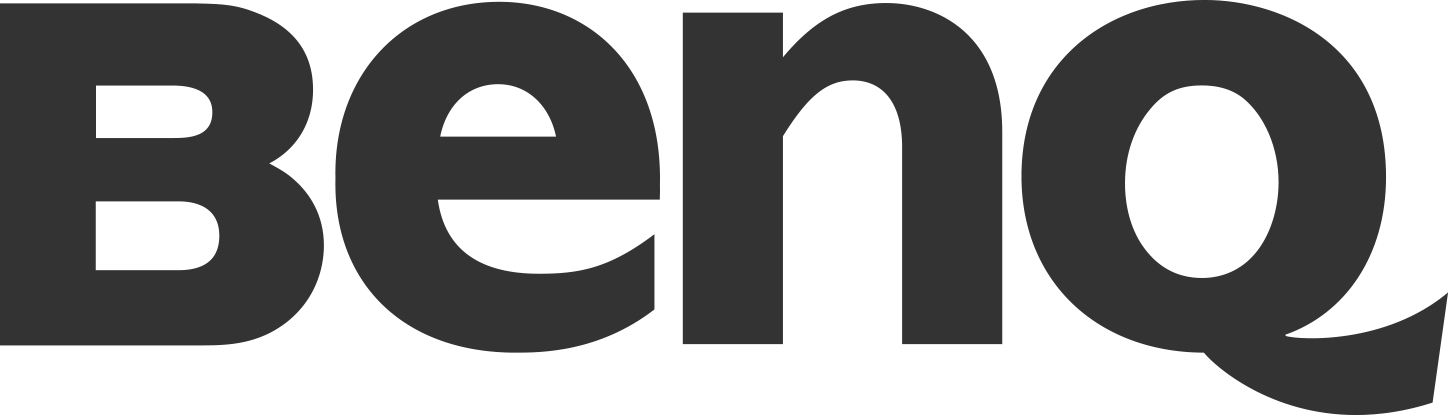
BenQ B2B logo

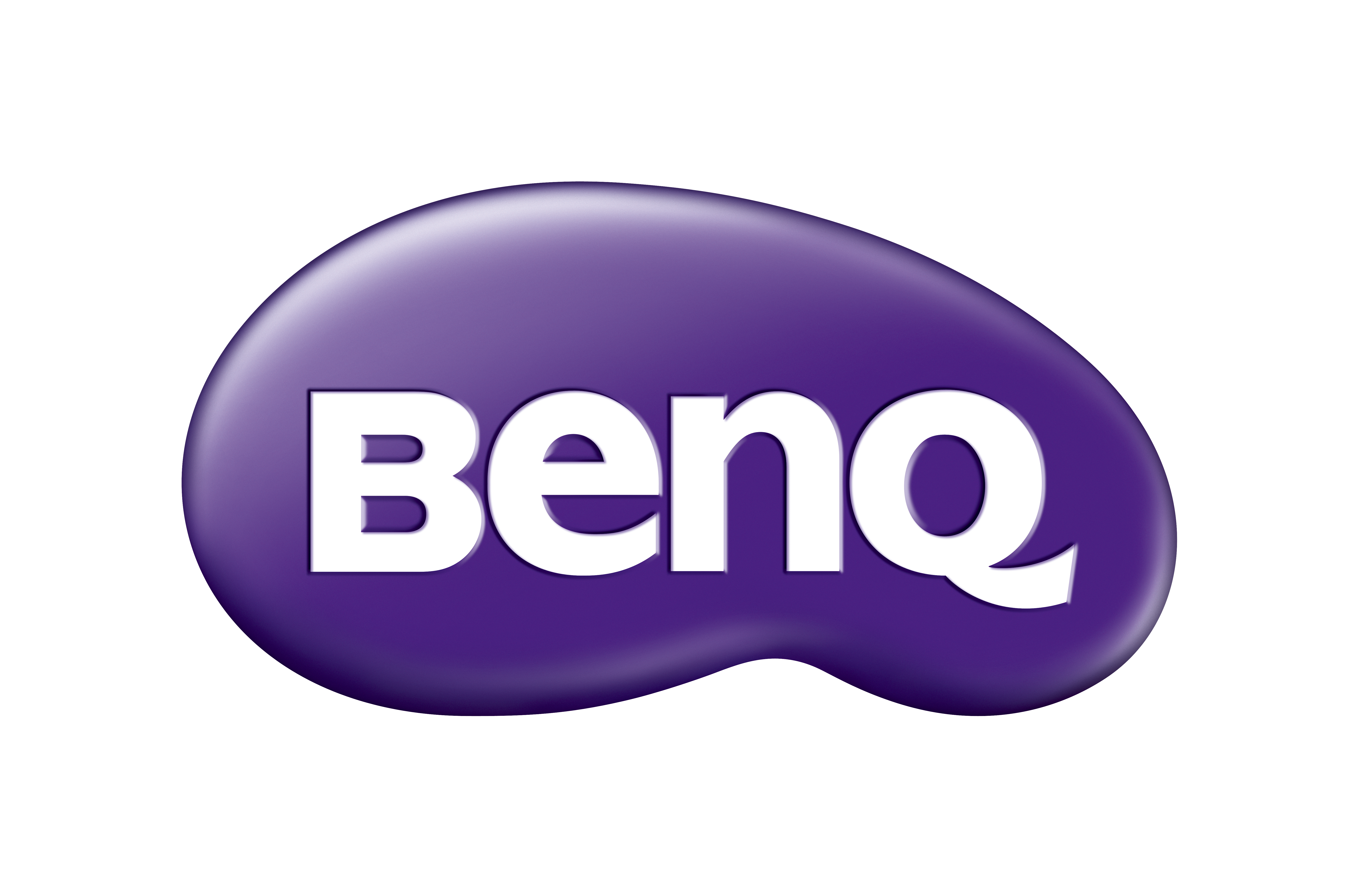
BenQ B2C Jellybean logo

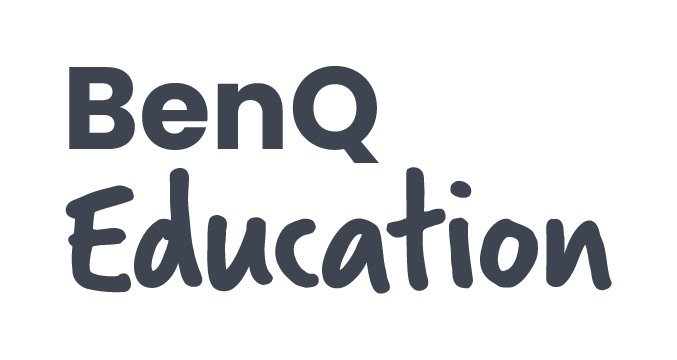
BenQ Education logo

=== History and key events ===
- 1984: Founded as Acer Peripherals, subsequently Acer Communication & Multimedia
- 2000: Acer reorganizes and increases separation of business units
- 2001: Formally renamed as BenQ
- 2007: Restructuring of BenQ under Qisda
- 2013–2015: BenQ returns temporarily to mobile phone market
- 2015: BenQ invested in ZOWIE, making ZOWIE a specialized esports brand under BenQ
- 2020: BenQ launches Mobiuz gaming monitors
- 2023: Launches BenQ Education

== Current products ==
The best-known products under the BenQ brand include display devices, particularly monitors and projectors, and peripherals. BenQ also produces related devices, such as digital signage, interactive displays, lighting, and other accessories.

The company today has an increasing emphasis on high-end, high-quality devices, such as professional gaming peripherals. BenQ is noted for its interest in the professional eSports area, including sponsorship, research, and working closely with professional gamers and esports organizations.

=== Monitors and accessories ===
BenQ's monitors have won numerous awards from international organizations such as iF Product Design Awards. Among recent award winners, in 2024 and 2025, were the MA series, RD Series, PD series and XL Series of monitors, and BenQ's color calibration software.

In 2025, BenQ's PD2730S 5K Designer Monitor and BenQ GW2486TC USB-C BenQ Home Office Monitor were among several products noted by reviewers for affordability and performance.

BenQ's MOBIUZ series of specialized gaming monitors are noted for features such as very high refresh rates. MOBIUZ monitors have been praised by reviewers for features such as a bright, colorful image, low input lag, and attractive styling.

The current range of BenQ accessories includes the Ergo Monitor Arm to support and position monitors, USB and HDMI docking units, and award-winning attachable cameras such as the IdeaCam range.

=== Projectors ===
BenQ took the largest market share for 4K and Full HD projectors in Q1 2022. According to Futuresource Consulting, BenQ reached the leading position as a vendor by sales volume in Europe, achieving a market share of 23.42% for 4K, and of 24.5% for Full HD.

In May 2023, BenQ announced three new models in their 1K home cinema range including W4000i, W2710i and TK860i.

In September 2023, BenQ released the Gaming Projector X Series - X3100i, X500i and X300G, which are compatible with all major consoles including Xbox, PlayStation and Nintendo Switch.

In 2024, BenQ launched several new projectors, including the TK710STi, W5800, W2720i, LH850ST, AH500ST, V5010i, AH700ST, EH700, GV50, and TK710. These models are designed to deliver exceptional performance for both home and professional use.

In 2025, The New York Times named BenQ's TK710 laser projector the year's 'The best budget 4K projector'. BenQ's projectors have won other praise and awards. For example, the W2720i 4K Home Cinema Projector was a winner in the iF Product Design Awards.

=== Esports and gaming: ZOWIE ===
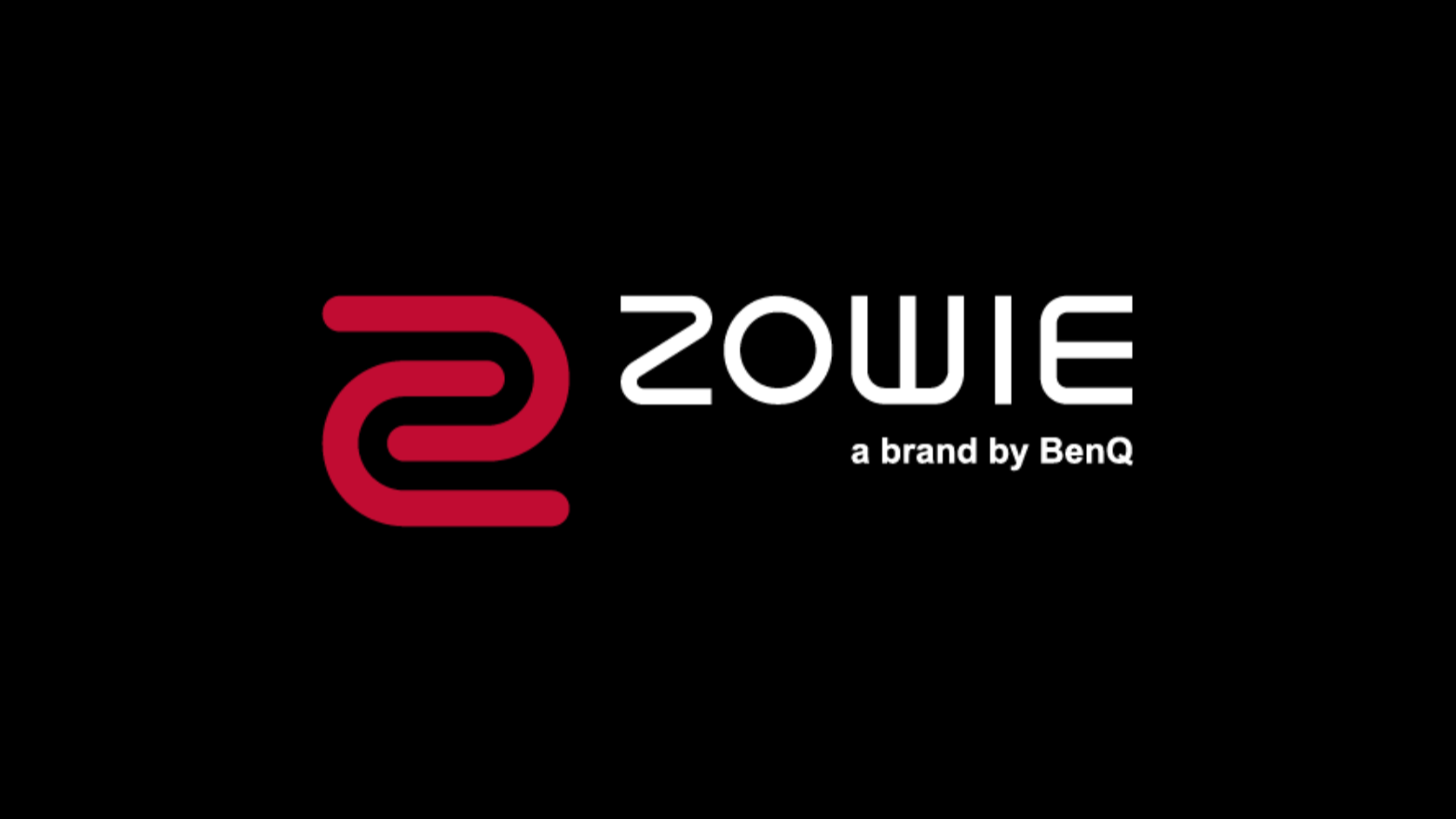
ZOWIE esports logo

BenQ's esport's brand, ZOWIE, is focused more strongly on professional-level esports equipment, offering monitors, mice, and other gaming accessories. The products are notable for unusual features such as ultra-high refresh rates of up to 600Hz and general technical excellence.

A survey in late 2024 placed ZOWIE in the top position of monitors used by pro gamers. ZOWIE mice have also been recognized as among the most commonly used by pro gamers. The ZOWIE G-SR mousepad was named as the 'Best for Control' by Eurogamer in 2025.

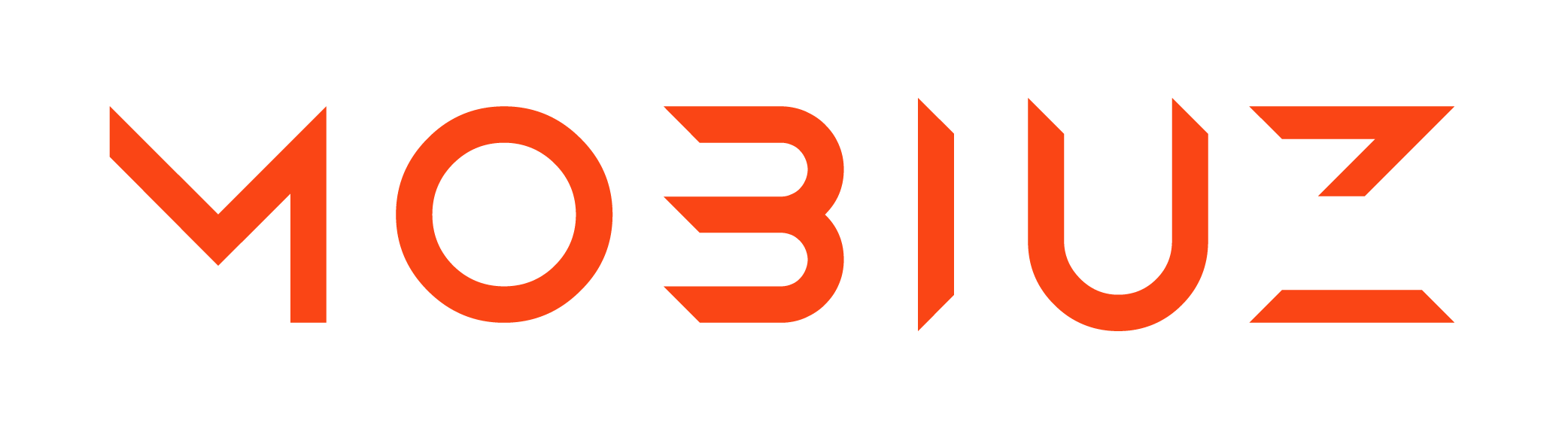
MOBIUZ Gaming logo

BenQ cooperates with professional esports teams and organizations such as Astralis, Sentinels, Talon, and BLEED, providing equipment and other assistance. The company also sponsors and supports gaming events.

Under the ZOWIE brand, BenQ has set up three sports science labs to work with professional gamers to develop better mice and other peripherals for them – focusing on optimizing shape, comfort and performance.

=== Lighting ===
The company markets various lighting products, some designed as backlights for use with monitors, and some for independent illumination, for purposes such as reading and working. These lighting products include the award-winning ScreenBar Halo 2 monitor light and MindDuo Max Floor Lamp. BenQ is recognized as being the first company to introduce a monitor light bar, in 2017, with the ScreenBar series.

=== Digital signage and interactive displays ===
BenQ's digital signage and interactive display products are designed primarily for business and education users. They include several recent award-winning products.

=== BenQ Education ===
In 2023, BenQ launched its subbrand, BenQ Education with a new logo, colour scheme and website to showcase its interactive displays for the education market. BenQ launched the first education interactive displays with official Google Mobile services at the BETT show in the UK.

== See also ==
- Siemens cellular telephones
- List of companies of Taiwan
- Acer Inc.
