= Digital artifact =

Computer graphic effect

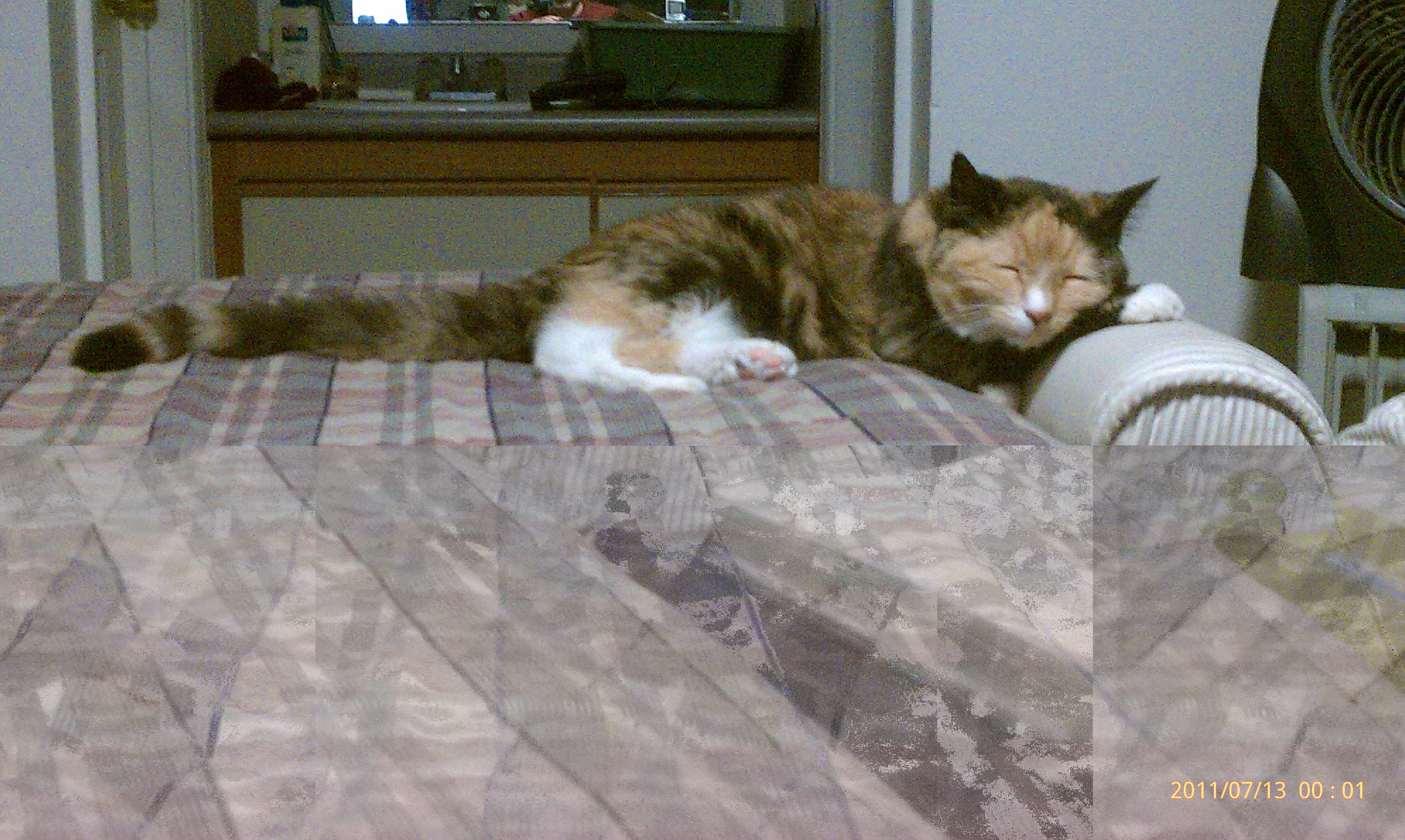
A complicated grid pattern is insufficiently processed by a smartphone camera.

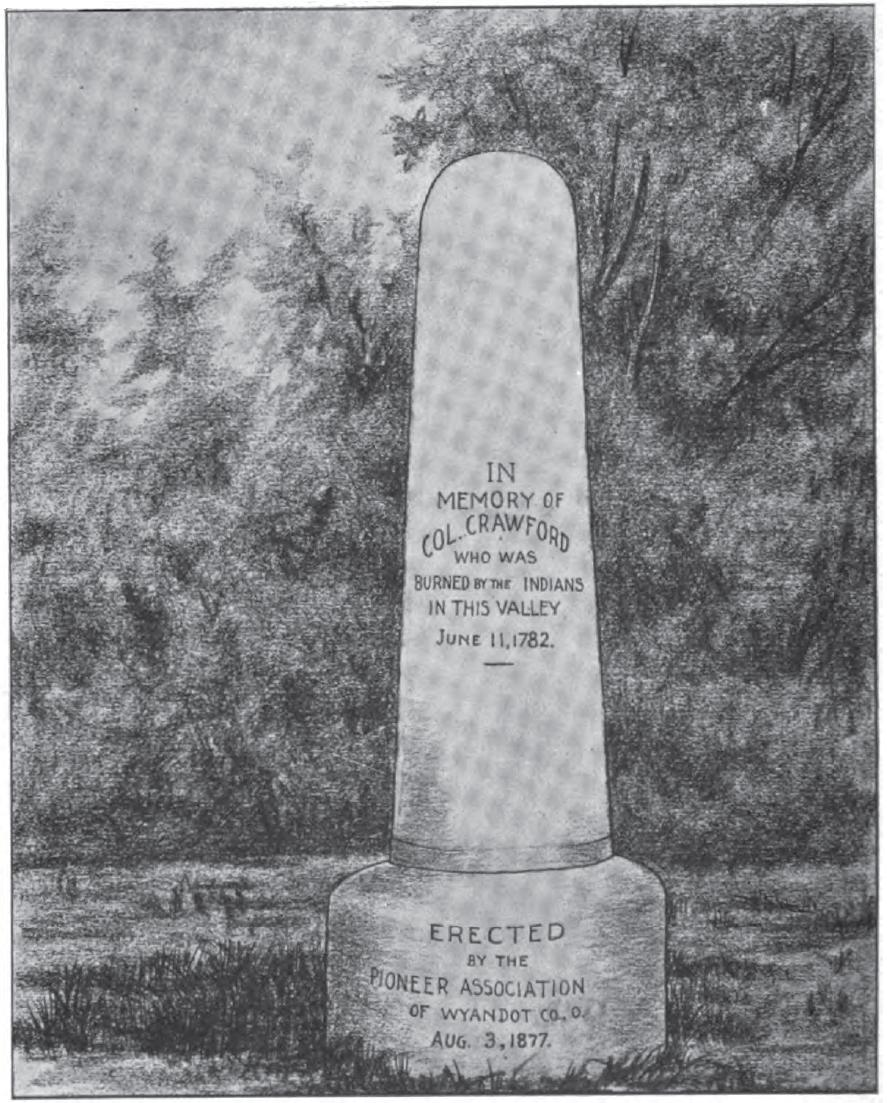
A scan of a drawing with large areas of whitespace; the diamond moiré pattern is a scanning artifact.

Digital artifact in information science, is any undesired or unintended alteration in data introduced in a digital process by an involved technique and/or technology.

Digital artifacts can be of any content type including text, audio, video, image, animation or a combination.

== Information science ==
In information science, digital artifacts result from:

- Hardware malfunction: In computer graphics, visual artifacts may be generated whenever a hardware component such as the processor, memory chip, cabling malfunctions, etc., corrupts data. Examples of malfunctions include physical damage, overheating, insufficient voltage and GPU overclocking. Common types of hardware artifacts are texture corruption and T-vertices in 3D graphics, and pixelization in MPEG compressed video.
- Software malfunction: Artifacts may be caused by algorithm flaws such as decoding/encoding audio or video, or a poor pseudo-random number generator that would introduce artifacts distinguishable from the desired noise into statistical models.
- Compression: Controlled amounts of unwanted information may be generated as a result of the use of lossy compression techniques. One example is the artifacts seen in JPEG and MPEG compression algorithms that produce compression artifacts.
- Quantization: Digital imprecision generated in the process of converting analog information into digital space, is due to the limited granularity of digital numbering space. In computer graphics, quantization is seen as pixelation.
- Aliasing: As a consequence of sampling or sample-rate conversion, energy from frequencies outside of the signal frequency band of interest are folded across multiples of the Nyquist frequency. This is typically mitigated by using an anti-aliasing filter.
- Filtering: The process of filtering a signal, such as using an anti-aliasing filter, causes undesired alterations to the signal due to imperfections in the frequency response magnitude and phase, and due to the time domain impulse response.
- Rolling shutter, the line scanning of an object that is moving too fast for the image sensor to capture a unitary image.
- Error diffusion: poorly-weighted kernel coefficients result in undesirable visual artifacts.
