= Crazy Chicken =

Video game franchise

- Genre: Shooting gallery game
- Publishers: Phenomedia AG (1999–2002); Phenomedia publishing GmbH (2002–2017) ak tronic Software & Services GmbH (2017–present)
- Creators: Ingo Mesche; Frank Ziemlinski
- Composer: Nils Fritze (2001–2006)
- Platform: List: Android Browser Game Boy Advance Game Boy Color iOS Java ME Nintendo 3DS Nintendo DS Nintendo Switch Nintendo Wii PC PlayStation PlayStation 2 PlayStation 4 PlayStation 5 S60 Steam Windows 8.1/RT
- First release: The Original Crazy Chicken Hunt; December 23, 1999; 26 years ago
- Latest release: Moorhuhn Kart 4 March 13, 2025; 20 months ago
- Spin-offs: Crazy Chicken Kart series Crazy Chicken Adventure series Crazy Chicken Jump'n Run series Crazy Chicken Sports series

Crazy Chicken (originally released in Germany as Moorhuhn), sometimes known as Chicken Hunter or Moorhen, is a shooting gallery video game franchise. While originally intended to merely serve as a small-scale advertising game, the first game's unintended online release and subsequent distribution as shareware were followed by an unexpected and widely unprecedented surge in popularity, making it Germany's most popular computer game in the early 2000s and enabling Crazy Chicken to develop into a multi-platform franchise with a variety of spin-offs and merchandise.

== History ==
The original Crazy Chicken game (now distributed as The Original Crazy Chicken Hunt) was commissioned by Bochum-based Art Department advertising agency - known for their advergames - and developed by Dutch Witan Studios as an advertisement for Johnnie Walker whisky in 1998. The concept of using a video game to promote the Johnnie Walker brand was originally thought up by another advertising agency, Hamburg-based Vorwerk & Buchholz, in 1997. A prototype of the game that would later be turned into The Original Crazy Chicken Hunt was shown off by Witan Studios at the Bizarre 98 demo party in summer of 1998 as KippenSchieten.

It was originally made available in October 1998 to play on laptops in select bars, with promoters dressed up as fowlers. While never intended for sale or further distribution, it seems to have been illicitly copied, and became widely available for download on private websites. The publisher's initial irritation at this subsided after the game received favorable mentions in popular media and demand for it grew. From the beginning of 1999 onwards, the game was officially made available for download by Art Department. It became wildly popular in German-speaking Europe, to the point of being described by various media outlets as a threat to the bottom line of businesses, on account of the number of hours wasted by employees playing the game due its ease of accessibility and shareability (the original game only had a file size of approximately 2 MB, meaning it could be sent via email).

The development studio and IP owner of the franchise went public in late 1999 at the height of the dot-com bubble and attained a market value of up to one billion Euro.

In 2002, their stock value rapidly collapsed after it became known that the company's leaders were under investigation for falsifying balance sheets. Chairman of the Vorstand Markus Scheer and CFO Björn Denhard, who confessed to the falsifications, were fired. In 2009, they were sentenced by a German court to 46 and 36 months' imprisonment, respectively, for securities fraud and other infractions. Scheer would subsequently leave the video game industry and turn to politics instead, allegedly becoming a puppet master of the far-right AfD party in North Rhine-Westphalia, until founding Bündnis Deutschland in 2022.

Phenomedia AG underwent insolvency proceedings. Its assets, including the Crazy Chicken series, were bought by a successor company, Phenomedia publishing GmbH, which continued to develop and publish games until its dissolution in 2017, from whereon out the company's assets - including the rights to the Crazy Chicken franchise - became property of its long-time publishing partner, ak tronic Software & Services GmbH.

== Gameplay ==
Screenshot from Crazy Chicken X

Within the mainline series, the concept of which is derived from the Glorious Twelfth, the main objective of the game usually is to attain a high score by shooting the titular Crazy Chickens within the framework of the single-screen shooting gallery genre. Players usually have 90 seconds and infinite ammunition to do so. Starting with Crazy Chicken 2, each game also contained a variety of puzzles and hidden secrets activated by shooting certain objects on screen in a particular order and/or with certain timing (netting a far higher score than the regular Crazy Chickens), which encouraged more competition and discussion concerning the games. Later entries would also go on to add elements such as a wider variety of enemies, bonus games after a successful round, multiple levels, etc...

Prominent spin-off series include the Mario Kart-inspired Crazy Chicken Kart series, the point-and-click Crazy Chicken Adventure series, the 2D-platforming Crazy Chicken Jump'n Run series, the Crazy Chicken Sports series, as well as several genre outliers making use of the franchise's settings and characters.

== Characters ==
The franchise features a variety of fictional returning characters:

- Crazy Chicken (Moorhuhn in German): The titular species of the series. Originally designed by Ingo Mesche (with the redesign used from Crazy Chicken X onwards created by 3D graphic artist Ernst Weber) for the cancelled Commodore Amiga game Duckling in 1992, these chickens would go on to be considered "Germany's most popular video game character". Throughout their appearances, they have displayed signs of intelligence, such as making use of objects, interacting with each other like an organized society, as well as wearing costumes and showing different character traits between individuals.
- Moorhuhn Indy: A Crazy Chicken parody of Indiana Jones. Serving as the main character of the Crazy Chicken Adventure and Crazy Chicken Jump'n Run subseries, as well as making minor appearances in various other games in the franchise, Moorhuhn Indy has received a noticeable number of characterisation. This includes traits such as a mix of adventurousness and childish naiveté, paired with a general clumsiness expressed both in his dialogue and actions. Furthermore, a comprehensive backstory involving his residence (a castle in the Scottish highlands) and extended family, such as his ghost-hunting grandfather, has been established.
- Moorfrog (Moorfrosch in German): Serving as the introduction to the secrets and puzzle mechanics which became a mainstay of the series from Crazy Chicken 2 onwards, this frog was supposed to attract players' attention by either sitting in plain sight and croaking, but dodging bullets unless certain other conditions are met, or serving as the gateway to other puzzles. He went on to make several appearances in the Crazy Chicken Kart series, appear as a mount in Crazy Chicken Tales, as well as receiving his own video game. In a press release, he was officially characterised as "the small green nuisance from Crazy Chicken 2 and the online game for the second championship".
- Hank: A mole introduced in Crazy Chicken Winter Edition. While his original purpose was to serve as a tutorial character to the player, later games had him become more involved in regular gameplay, such as in Crazy Chicken Wanted, where Hank has to be lured out in order to shoot the key to the next stage out from his hands. Aside from his appearances in the Crazy Chicken Kart series, he would later become playable in his own game, where his mission was to steal treasure from the Uru, a fictional race of earth spirits.
- Kroet (Kröt in German): This anthropomorphic turtle made his first appearance in Crazy Chicken 3 under the name of "Marzipan", guarding the same baby turtles which would eventually become the main focus of his own game, where alien octopuses have taken over several bays, abducting and freezing Kroet's fellow sea creatures in the process. Whereas previous appearances, such as the ones in the Crazy Chicken Kart series, depicted him without many distinguishing features, his own spin-off equipped him with goggles, a jet pack and a laser gun.
- Lesshuhn: A close relative of the Crazy Chicken introduced in Crazy Chicken 3. They are described as a dim-witted species, whose stupidity has brought them to the brink of extinction, providing an in-universe explanation as to why shooting them is usually penalised by deducting points from the player's score. Their name is a pun based on the fact that the "Moor" in the original German name of the Crazy Chicken (Moorhuhn) sounds similar to the English word "more", to which "less" would be the natural opposite. In addition, their name is similar to "Blässhuhn", the German name of the common coot.

== List of video games ==
=== Mainline series ===
Title	Details	Short description
The Original Crazy Chicken Hunt / Moorhen - Chicken Chase / The Original Moorhuhn Hunt Original release date(s): 1998 - Advertisement release December 23, 1999 - Commercial release	Original System(s): PC - 1999; Game Boy Color - 2000; PalmOS - 2001; Java – 2002; Remake: PC – 2005; Browser – 2005; iOS, Android – 2017; Nintendo Switch – 2018; PlayStation 4, PlayStation 5 – 2021; Remastered: iOS, Android – 2025; Nintendo Switch – 2025; Steam – 2025; PlayStation 4, PlayStation 5 – 2025	Originally conceived as a small-scale advergame (all branding was removed in subsequent rereleases), this shooting gallery game gives the player 90 seconds and infinite ammunition to get as high of a score as possible by shooting different elements (mainly the titular Crazy Chickens, which award more points the further they are in the distance) on a single screen, set at the Scottish countryside. The 2005 version of the Remake merely contains visual updates to the game, whereas subsequent rereleases include some stage elements from Crazy Chicken 3. A remaster version was released in 2025 for console, PC and mobile to celebrate 25th anniversary of the franchise. For the console version, if you score 800 points, the remake version of the game will be unlocked as a bonus.
The Original Crazy Chicken Hunt / Moorhen - Chicken Chase / The Original Moorhuhn Hunt Original release date(s): 1998 - Advertisement release December 23, 1999 - Commercial release	Notes: First shown off in 1998 as KippenSchieten; Original release title: Crazy Chicken (Moorhuhn in German); Original versions published by Ravensburger Interactive Media; PC version of the remake published by ak tronic Software & Services GmbH; Later versions of the remake and remastered published by Higgs Games; PS4 and PS5 version of the remake and remastered published by Markt+Technik; The Java version is called Moorhen (Moorhuhn Classic in German); A special version designated for the 1st German Crazy Chicken Championship was released for browsers, with the only major difference being a shared online leaderboard	
Crazy Chicken 2 Original release date: September 20, 2000	System(s): PC – 2000; PlayStation – 2000; Game Boy Color – 2001; Apple PowerPC – 2001	Playing much like the original, this sequel added many more objects to be shot, many of which interact with each other, serving as puzzles for the player to solve. These puzzles would become a mainstay of the series. Secrets such as a hidden version of Snake have also been implemented. Set near a Scottish village.
Crazy Chicken 2 Original release date: September 20, 2000	Notes: Known as Moorhuhn 2 - Die Jagd geht weiter in German; Published by Ravensburger Interactive Media; The Snake mini game received a standalone Adobe Flash release; A special version designated for the second Crazy Chicken German Online Championship (which, despite its name, was also used for the Austrian championship) was released for browsers	Playing much like the original, this sequel added many more objects to be shot, many of which interact with each other, serving as puzzles for the player to solve. These puzzles would become a mainstay of the series. Secrets such as a hidden version of Snake have also been implemented. Set near a Scottish village.
Crazy Chicken Swiss Online Championship Original release date: March 1, 2001	System(s): Browser – 2001	A training game for the titular Crazy Chicken Swiss championship, making use of the same mechanics as Crazy Chicken 2, while using an Alpine setting, complete with original puzzles involving elements such as a wooden cabin or the bus introduced in the second German Online Championship driving by.
Crazy Chicken Swiss Online Championship Original release date: March 1, 2001	Notes: Known as Moorhuhn Schweizer Meisterschaft in German; Published by Bluewin	A training game for the titular Crazy Chicken Swiss championship, making use of the same mechanics as Crazy Chicken 2, while using an Alpine setting, complete with original puzzles involving elements such as a wooden cabin or the bus introduced in the second German Online Championship driving by.
Crazy Chicken Winter Edition Original release date: March 18, 2001	System(s): PC – 2001	A standalone add-on for Crazy Chicken 2, this game is the exact same as the former, with only the Scottish village setting being changed to take place during winter and some of the puzzles being changed in the process. Includes Haribo advertising.
Crazy Chicken Winter Edition Original release date: March 18, 2001	Notes: Known as Moorhuhn Winter-Edition in German; Published by Ravensburger Interactive Media	A standalone add-on for Crazy Chicken 2, this game is the exact same as the former, with only the Scottish village setting being changed to take place during winter and some of the puzzles being changed in the process. Includes Haribo advertising.
Crazy Chicken Pottmasters Original release date: March 17, 2001	Original System(s): Browser – 2001; 2003 version: Browser – 2003	Serving as the qualifying round for the 2001 Crazy Chicken Championship in North Rhine-Westphalia, this game, which reuses the setting of Crazy Chicken 2, only at night, aimed to forego all puzzles and gimmicks introduced in previous entries and focus on the main aiming and shooting aspects of the franchise. The 2003 version introduced many quality-of-life improvements as well as new puzzles and secrets.
Crazy Chicken Pottmasters Original release date: March 17, 2001	Notes: Known as Moorhuhn Pottmasters in German; Published by Phenomedia AG; A remake titled Moorhuhn Pottmasters 2003 replaced the original on January 9, 2003	Serving as the qualifying round for the 2001 Crazy Chicken Championship in North Rhine-Westphalia, this game, which reuses the setting of Crazy Chicken 2, only at night, aimed to forego all puzzles and gimmicks introduced in previous entries and focus on the main aiming and shooting aspects of the franchise. The 2003 version introduced many quality-of-life improvements as well as new puzzles and secrets.
Crazy Chicken Good Ol' Times Original release date: July 6, 2001	System(s): Browser – 2001	A classic Crazy Chicken game taking place in a rural setting with graphical effects reminiscent of old movies. It features new enemies, such as a bunny, and secrets, such as hidden balloons or the "Speed Chicken" event. The game was subject to a fictional development story claiming that Good Ol' Times was the lost first game in the series and rediscovered only shortly before release in the basement of Phenomedia.
Crazy Chicken Good Ol' Times Original release date: July 6, 2001	Notes: Known as Moorhuhn Good Ol' Times in German; Published by Phenomedia AG	A classic Crazy Chicken game taking place in a rural setting with graphical effects reminiscent of old movies. It features new enemies, such as a bunny, and secrets, such as hidden balloons or the "Speed Chicken" event. The game was subject to a fictional development story claiming that Good Ol' Times was the lost first game in the series and rediscovered only shortly before release in the basement of Phenomedia.
Crazy Chicken 3 / Country Varmint Hunter Original release date: October 4, 2001	System(s): PC - 2001; Game Boy Color - 2002; Game Boy Advance - 2002; PlayStation - 2002	While the core 90-second, single-screen gameplay remained the same, this entry takes place at a beach with its own puzzles and enemies, such as the Lesshuhn, which deducts points when shot, or a CPU-controlled rival hunter that tries to score more points than the player. Includes a hidden version of Tetris named Moortris. The US-American version, Country Varmint Hunter, replaces the Crazy Chickens with generic birds.
Crazy Chicken 3 / Country Varmint Hunter Original release date: October 4, 2001	Notes: Known as Moorhuhn 3 - Es gibt Huhn! in German; PC version published by Phenomedia AG; GBC, GBA and PS1 versions published by Ubisoft; The Moortris mini game received a standalone Adobe Flash release	While the core 90-second, single-screen gameplay remained the same, this entry takes place at a beach with its own puzzles and enemies, such as the Lesshuhn, which deducts points when shot, or a CPU-controlled rival hunter that tries to score more points than the player. Includes a hidden version of Tetris named Moortris. The US-American version, Country Varmint Hunter, replaces the Crazy Chickens with generic birds.
Crazy Chicken X / Chicken Hunter Original release date: May 15, 2003	Original System(s): PC – 2003; Java – 2004; PlayStation – 2005; PlayStation 2 – 2006; DeluXe/HD: iOS – 2009; Android – 2012; Windows RT – 2012; Windows 8.1 – 2013; Remake: iOS – 2022; Android – 2022; Nintendo Switch – 2022; Steam – 2022; PlayStation 4, PlayStation 5 – 2023	Taking place at a farm in autumn, this game is the first in the series to introduce the modern character designs used for the rest of the franchise. While this entry removed the new features from its predecessor, it was the first to introduce shorter bonus games after the end of a round. Later releases play similarly, but allow for more control, language and aspect ratio options. The remake version for iOS, Android, Nintendo Switch, Steam, PlayStation 4 and PlayStation 5 releases additionally include four new mini games.
Crazy Chicken X / Chicken Hunter Original release date: May 15, 2003	Notes: Known as Moorhuhn X in German; PC version published by ak tronic Software & Services GmbH; Java phone version published by Mobile Scope AG; PS2 version published by Play It Ltd.; All other versions published by Phenomedia publishing GmbH; The original smartphone version is either called Crazy Chicken DeluXe or Crazy Chicken HD and was published by Doyodo.; Later, a remake version for Android, iOS, Nintendo Switch and Steam, called Moorhuhn X - Crazy Chicken X was published by Higgs Games GmbH. The remake was later released a year later for PlayStation 4 and PlayStation 5 by Markt+Technik.; Available in XS (free demo), XL (5€) and XXL (full game) versions	
Moorhuhn Camera X Original release date: May 4, 2004	System(s): Nokia 3650, 3660, 6600 - 2004; Siemens SX1 - 2004	The first motion-controlled game in the series, Camera X makes use of the mobile phone's camera as a motion sensor. Moving the phone will move the aiming reticle, with Crazy Chickens hiding behind different virtual objects.
Moorhuhn Camera X Original release date: May 4, 2004	Notes: Published by Jamba	The first motion-controlled game in the series, Camera X makes use of the mobile phone's camera as a motion sensor. Moving the phone will move the aiming reticle, with Crazy Chickens hiding behind different virtual objects.
Crazy Chicken Wanted / Chicken Hunter Wantedl Original release date: August 12, 2004	System(s): PC - 2004; Browser - 2004; Nintendo Switch - 2018; PlayStation 4, PlayStation 5 - 2022	The first game in the series to incorporate multiple levels (three normal and one bonus level), progression through which requires solving different puzzles. Set in the Wild West, Wanted also introduced "Desperado Chickens", which will shoot towards the screen, hurting the player and bringing a Health system to the series.
Crazy Chicken Wanted / Chicken Hunter Wantedl Original release date: August 12, 2004	Notes: Known as Moorhuhn Wanted in German; Published by ak tronic Software & Services GmbH; Available in XS (free demo), XL (5€) and XXL (full game) versions; The High Hun bonus level and Los Dosos mini game received standalone Adobe Flash releases	The first game in the series to incorporate multiple levels (three normal and one bonus level), progression through which requires solving different puzzles. Set in the Wild West, Wanted also introduced "Desperado Chickens", which will shoot towards the screen, hurting the player and bringing a Health system to the series.
Ancient Crazy Chicken Game Original release date: November 3, 2004	System(s): Browser - 2004	While the core gameplay and style is similar to the first entries in the Crazy Chicken series, but set in Ancient Egypt, this game follows a new monetisation scheme by allowing players to either a train in a free single-player mode or a compete for real-life money by wagering a stake for the high score.
Ancient Crazy Chicken Game Original release date: November 3, 2004	Notes: Known as Moorhuhn Ancient in German; Published by Phenomedia publishing GmbH	While the core gameplay and style is similar to the first entries in the Crazy Chicken series, but set in Ancient Egypt, this game follows a new monetisation scheme by allowing players to either a train in a free single-player mode or a compete for real-life money by wagering a stake for the high score.
Crazy Chicken Invasion Original release date: August 15, 2005	System(s): PC - 2005; Browser - 2005; Java - 2005; Android - 2014, 2023 (re-released); Steam - 2015; Nintendo Switch - 2023; iOS - 2023; PlayStation 4, PlayStation 5 - 2024	Going back to the format of Crazy Chicken X, this game only consists of one 90-second main and one unlockable 45-second bonus level. They are set during an alien invasion, enabling the inclusion of many new stage elements and puzzles. It also includes a mini game called Crazy Chicken 1984, which aims to replicate the look and feel of 80's Arcade games.
Crazy Chicken Invasion Original release date: August 15, 2005	Notes: Known as Moorhuhn Invasion in German; PC and Java versions published by ak tronic Software & Services GmbH; Android version published by Doyodo; Steam version published by Retroism; Nintendo Switch, IOS and Android (re-released version) published by Higgs Games GmbH; PlayStation 4 and PlayStation 5 published by Markt+Technik.	Going back to the format of Crazy Chicken X, this game only consists of one 90-second main and one unlockable 45-second bonus level. They are set during an alien invasion, enabling the inclusion of many new stage elements and puzzles. It also includes a mini game called Crazy Chicken 1984, which aims to replicate the look and feel of 80's Arcade games.
Crazy Chicken Pirates Original release date: July 15, 2006	System(s): PC - 2006; Browser - 2009; DSiWare - 2012; Nintendo 3DS - 2012; iOS - 2013; Android - 2015; Nintendo Switch - 2022; Steam - 2023; PlayStation 4, PlayStation 5 - 2024	Plays similarly to its predecessor, but with a setting and puzzles based on Caribbean islands. This is the first game in the series to completely forego Crazy Chickens, replacing them with Pirate Chickens instead. The hidden bonus game this time, Repel the boarders, has the player shoot down enemy pirates before they reach the ship. The iOS/Android versions add a Time Attack and Tower Defense mode.
Crazy Chicken Pirates Original release date: July 15, 2006	Notes: Known as Moorhuhn Piraten in German; Published by Phenomedia publishing GmbH; The Browser version is called Crazy Chicken Pirate Isle; The Repel the boarders bonus game received a standalone Adobe Flash release	Plays similarly to its predecessor, but with a setting and puzzles based on Caribbean islands. This is the first game in the series to completely forego Crazy Chickens, replacing them with Pirate Chickens instead. The hidden bonus game this time, Repel the boarders, has the player shoot down enemy pirates before they reach the ship. The iOS/Android versions add a Time Attack and Tower Defense mode.
Crazy Chicken X-Mas Original release date: November 28, 2007	System(s): Browser - 2007	A browser version of Crazy Chicken Remake that is set during winter, introducing season-appropriate puzzles and giving all Crazy Chickens Santa Claus hats.
Crazy Chicken X-Mas Original release date: November 28, 2007	Notes: Known as Moorhuhn X-Mas in German; Published by Phenomedia publishing GmbH	A browser version of Crazy Chicken Remake that is set during winter, introducing season-appropriate puzzles and giving all Crazy Chickens Santa Claus hats.
Crazy Chicken Director's Cut Original release date: December 15, 2007	System(s): PC - 2007; DSiWare - 2013; Nintendo 3DS - 2013; iOS, Android - 2014	While retaining the basic shooting and pointing mechanics the series is known for, Director's Cut completely changes the progression system. Instead of taking place in a singular level with the primary objective being to score as many points as possible in 90 seconds, this game features two different levels inspired by film sets, with certain conditions having to be met (like reaching a point limit or solving a puzzle) in order to progress to the next "take", with each one switching between the different sets. This continues until players run out of ammunition, with refills becoming increasingly rare.
Crazy Chicken Director's Cut Original release date: December 15, 2007	Notes: Known as Moorhuhn Director's Cut in German; PC version published by Phenomedia publishing GmbH; All other versions published by Teyon	
10 Jahre Moorhuhn Original release date: January 12, 2010	System(s): Browser - 2010	A single-screen shooting gallery game reusing the setting from Crazy Chicken X to celebrate the 10th anniversary of the franchise by including a one-armed bandit in the background that can be shot to display a random number from 1999 to 2010. Depending on the number, any event representing one of the main Crazy Chicken games from that respective year might occur.
10 Jahre Moorhuhn Original release date: January 12, 2010	Notes: Published by Phenomedia publishing GmbH	A single-screen shooting gallery game reusing the setting from Crazy Chicken X to celebrate the 10th anniversary of the franchise by including a one-armed bandit in the background that can be shot to display a random number from 1999 to 2010. Depending on the number, any event representing one of the main Crazy Chicken games from that respective year might occur.
Crazy Chicken Halloween Original release date: October 31, 2010	System(s): Browser - 2010	A completely original Crazy Chicken game set in an ancient temple underground, with mummies, skeletons, chicken bats and other enemies based on Horror movies. Played completely in black and white.
Crazy Chicken Halloween Original release date: October 31, 2010	Notes: Known as Moorhuhn Halloween in German; Published by Phenomedia publishing GmbH	A completely original Crazy Chicken game set in an ancient temple underground, with mummies, skeletons, chicken bats and other enemies based on Horror movies. Played completely in black and white.
Moorhuhn 360° Original release date: September 1, 2017	System(s): Browser - 2017	A version of The Original Crazy Chicken Hunt that reimagines the game in a fully-three-dimensional environment, with the player being able to turn the camera in a first-person perspective. Part of an initiative to publish HTML5-based Crazy Chicken browser games on Gamesdistribution.com (all other results of that initiative were ports of older browser games).
Moorhuhn 360° Original release date: September 1, 2017	Notes: Published by OrangeGames	A version of The Original Crazy Chicken Hunt that reimagines the game in a fully-three-dimensional environment, with the player being able to turn the camera in a first-person perspective. Part of an initiative to publish HTML5-based Crazy Chicken browser games on Gamesdistribution.com (all other results of that initiative were ports of older browser games).
Moorhuhn VR Original release date: December 25, 2017	System(s): iOS, Android - 2017	Following the groundwork laid by Moorhuhn 360°, this game similarly adapts the setting and gameplay of a preexisting title (Crazy Chicken X) into a 360° environment. VR is primarily controlled via motion, with players having to slide their smartphone into a papercraft stereoscope and then move their head to move the aiming reticle in the game.
Moorhuhn VR Original release date: December 25, 2017	Notes: Published by Moorhuhn GmbH; Released in three versions: Fun Edition (includes access key for the game and papercraft that has to be folded into a stereoscope), Gold Edition (pre-folded stereoscope with better lenses) and Limited Edition (signed by Frank Ziemlinski, part of a giveaway)	Following the groundwork laid by Moorhuhn 360°, this game similarly adapts the setting and gameplay of a preexisting title (Crazy Chicken X) into a 360° environment. VR is primarily controlled via motion, with players having to slide their smartphone into a papercraft stereoscope and then move their head to move the aiming reticle in the game.
Crazy Chicken Xtreme Original release date: May 15, 2022	System(s): Nintendo Switch - 2022; PlayStation 4 - 2022; PlayStation 5 - 2022; PC - 2022; Steam - 2022	Going back to the 3-level-setup from Wanted, this game features classic high score-based gameplay, with players once again having 90 seconds to shoot down as many Crazy Chickens and solve as many puzzles on the forest campsite, haunted castle and medieval village stages as possible. The game is also the first in the series to feature simultaneous multiplayer.
Crazy Chicken Xtreme Original release date: May 15, 2022	Notes: Known as Moorhuhn Xtreme in German; Published by Markt+Technik	Going back to the 3-level-setup from Wanted, this game features classic high score-based gameplay, with players once again having 90 seconds to shoot down as many Crazy Chickens and solve as many puzzles on the forest campsite, haunted castle and medieval village stages as possible. The game is also the first in the series to feature simultaneous multiplayer.

=== Spin-Offs ===
==== Kart series ====
Title	Details	Short description
Crazy Chicken Kart Classic Original release date: November 18, 2002	Original System(s): PC - 2002; PlayStation - 2002; Racer: Java - 2002	A Mario Kart-inspired kart racer, this game includes Grand Prix, Time Trial, 2-player-splitscreen and Ghost Racing modes. It features five race tracks, ten items and five playable drivers from previous entries in the franchise. Moorhen Kart Racer is the same, except without items and demade to play like an isometric sprite-based game.
Crazy Chicken Kart Classic Original release date: November 18, 2002	Notes: Original release title: Crazy Chicken Kart (Moorhuhn Kart in German); PC and PS1 versions published by ak tronic Software & Services GmbH; The Java phone version was published by Mobile Scope AG; The Java phone version is called Moorhen Kart Racer; Available in XS (free demo), XL (5€) and XXL (full game) versions	A Mario Kart-inspired kart racer, this game includes Grand Prix, Time Trial, 2-player-splitscreen and Ghost Racing modes. It features five race tracks, ten items and five playable drivers from previous entries in the franchise. Moorhen Kart Racer is the same, except without items and demade to play like an isometric sprite-based game.
Moorhen Kart 2004 Original release date: September 15, 2003	System(s): Java - 2003	While retaining the five drivers and items from its predecessor, this game is somewhat of an outlier in the series, playing more like Pole Position than Mario Kart. Thus, it features four new, unique race tracks.
Moorhen Kart 2004 Original release date: September 15, 2003	Notes: Known as Moorhuhn Kart 2004 in German; Published by Mobile Scope AG	While retaining the five drivers and items from its predecessor, this game is somewhat of an outlier in the series, playing more like Pole Position than Mario Kart. Thus, it features four new, unique race tracks.
Crazy Chicken Kart Extra Original release date: September 15, 2003	System(s): PC - 2003	An expanded version of Crazy Chicken Kart Classic, this version introduces five new tracks, a remixed main theme and different physics for the different playable drivers.
Crazy Chicken Kart Extra Original release date: September 15, 2003	Notes: Known as Moorhuhn Kart Extra in German; Published by ak tronic Software & Services GmbH; Available in XS (free demo), XL (5€) and XXL (full game) versions	An expanded version of Crazy Chicken Kart Classic, this version introduces five new tracks, a remixed main theme and different physics for the different playable drivers.
Crazy Chicken Kart 2 / Chicken Hunter: License to Grill Original release date(s): April 15, 2004	Original System(s): PC - 2004; Fun Kart 2008: PlayStation 2 - 2008; Remastered: iOS, Android - 2019; Steam - 2020; Nintendo Switch - 2021; PlayStation 4, PlayStation 5 - 2022	While featuring the same cast as Kart Extra, plus two new drivers, this game makes use of a completely new engine, includes eight new tracks and items, and completely revamps the mode selection. Fun Kart 2008 features a multitude of aesthetic and a few minor gameplay changes. The remastered version is based on the 2004 release, but runs in Unity.
Crazy Chicken Kart 2 / Chicken Hunter: License to Grill Original release date(s): April 15, 2004	Notes: Known as Moorhuhn Kart 2 in German; Published by ak tronic Software & Services GmbH; Available in XS (free demo), XL (5€) and XXL (full game) versions; The game received two remasters: One known as Crazy Chicken Fun Kart 2008 and the other simply as Crazy Chicken Kart 2 Remastered (or sometimes as Crazy Chicken Kart Multiplayer Racing)	While featuring the same cast as Kart Extra, plus two new drivers, this game makes use of a completely new engine, includes eight new tracks and items, and completely revamps the mode selection. Fun Kart 2008 features a multitude of aesthetic and a few minor gameplay changes. The remastered version is based on the 2004 release, but runs in Unity.
Crazy Chicken Kart 3 Original release date: March 15, 2007	System(s): PC - 2007	This entry in the series not only adds eight new tracks following a time travel theme, but also features major reworks to the character roster and karts, as well as adding new modes (including online multiplayer) and track obstacles. The number of racers per match has been decreased from six to five.
Crazy Chicken Kart 3 Original release date: March 15, 2007	Notes: Known as Moorhuhn Kart 3 in German; Published by Phenomedia publishing GmbH	This entry in the series not only adds eight new tracks following a time travel theme, but also features major reworks to the character roster and karts, as well as adding new modes (including online multiplayer) and track obstacles. The number of racers per match has been decreased from six to five.
Crazy Chicken Kart Thunder Original release date: March 3, 2008	System(s): PC - 2008	Introducing not only nine new tracks based on major cities around the globe, the fourth mainline entry in the Crazy Chicken Kart series also makes changes to the characters – of which now six can race at the same time again – by not only changing the roster, but giving each one an exclusive item to use. Additionally, off-road terrain has unique physics for the first time in the series, exclusive arenas for battle mode have been introduced and karts are now fully customisable.
Crazy Chicken Kart Thunder Original release date: March 3, 2008	Notes: Known as Moorhuhn Kart Thunder in German; Published by Phenomedia publishing GmbH	Introducing not only nine new tracks based on major cities around the globe, the fourth mainline entry in the Crazy Chicken Kart series also makes changes to the characters – of which now six can race at the same time again – by not only changing the roster, but giving each one an exclusive item to use. Additionally, off-road terrain has unique physics for the first time in the series, exclusive arenas for battle mode have been introduced and karts are now fully customisable.
Crazy Chicken Star Karts Original release date: December 25, 2008	System(s): Nintendo DS - 2008	Directly following up the story of Atlantis, Moorhuhn Indy discovers plans to create a "Sun Sphere", an object able to harness the power of an entire sun. A mistake by his assistant ends up warping him through time and space, which leads to the setting of this game: An intergalactic space race with the Sun Sphere as the prize. The highly customisable Karts, tracks and UI elements parody the Star Wars and Star Trek franchises.
Crazy Chicken Star Karts Original release date: December 25, 2008	Notes: Known as Moorhuhn Star Karts in German; Published by Phenomedia publishing GmbH	Directly following up the story of Atlantis, Moorhuhn Indy discovers plans to create a "Sun Sphere", an object able to harness the power of an entire sun. A mistake by his assistant ends up warping him through time and space, which leads to the setting of this game: An intergalactic space race with the Sun Sphere as the prize. The highly customisable Karts, tracks and UI elements parody the Star Wars and Star Trek franchises.
Moorhuhn Kart 4 Original release date: March 13, 2025	System(s): Nintendo Switch - 2025; PlayStation 4, PlayStation 5 - 2025; Steam - 2025	The fourth main entry in the Crazy Chicken Kart series expands on the formular by introducing a new art style, new items, a new racer and online multiplayer. The track selection has been fully updated as well, now featuring new tracks with each representing an entry in the mainline series as well as Moorhuhn-adjacent franchises.
Moorhuhn Kart 4 Original release date: March 13, 2025	Notes: Developed by Korion Interactive; Published by Markt+Technik	The fourth main entry in the Crazy Chicken Kart series expands on the formular by introducing a new art style, new items, a new racer and online multiplayer. The track selection has been fully updated as well, now featuring new tracks with each representing an entry in the mainline series as well as Moorhuhn-adjacent franchises.

==== Adventure series ====
Title	Details	Short description
Crazy Chicken Adventure - The Pharao's Treasure Original release date(s): December 15, 2003	Original System(s): PC - 2003; Mini game-focused version(s): Nintendo DS - 2008; Browser (Facebook) - 2013; Browser (standalone) - 2014	A point-and-click adventure, this game introduces the character of Moorhuhn Indy (a Crazy Chicken inspired by Indiana Jones). The player has to issue commands to Moorhuhn Indy in order to solve the puzzles encountered during his quest to discover an ancient Egyptian treasure. Points are awarded for correct combinations and picking up objects, but deducted for incorrect interactions. The DS version and subsequent rereleases put more emphasis on individual mini games and thus introduce more of them. The Browser versions are based on the DS version, but make use of avatars and a 'bullet' feature that requires the player to either wait for or be gifted bullets by players registered as friends to continue playing.
Crazy Chicken Adventure - The Pharao's Treasure Original release date(s): December 15, 2003	Notes: Known as Moorhuhn Adventure - Der Schatz des Pharao in German; PC version published by ak tronic Software & Services GmbH; DS version published by Phenomedia publishing GmbH; Available in XS (free demo) and XXL (full game) versions	
Crazy Chicken Adventure - Cursed Gold Original release date(s): January 15, 2005	System(s): PC - 2005	This game plays very similarly to its predecessor, making use of the same point-and-click mechanics. Storywise, Indy's treasure acquired at the end of the first game has been seized by tax authorities, leaving only a cursed statue behind, which he sets out to return to Egypt.
Crazy Chicken Adventure - Cursed Gold Original release date(s): January 15, 2005	Notes: Known as Moorhuhn Adventure - Der Fluch des Goldes in German; Published by ak tronic Software & Services GmbH	This game plays very similarly to its predecessor, making use of the same point-and-click mechanics. Storywise, Indy's treasure acquired at the end of the first game has been seized by tax authorities, leaving only a cursed statue behind, which he sets out to return to Egypt.

==== Jump'n Run series ====
Title	Details	Short description
Moorhen Seasons Original release date(s): July 2003	System(s): Java - 2002	Set on an island containing 13 levels based on the four seasons, this game takes the form of an odyssey as a chicken named Morre searches for his friends, who were kidnapped by a mad scientist. Seasons greatly varies from subsequent releases in the series in its themes, characters and focus on puzzles and power-ups.
Moorhen Seasons Original release date(s): July 2003	Notes: Known as Moorhuhn Seasons in German; Published by Mobile Scope AG	Set on an island containing 13 levels based on the four seasons, this game takes the form of an odyssey as a chicken named Morre searches for his friends, who were kidnapped by a mad scientist. Seasons greatly varies from subsequent releases in the series in its themes, characters and focus on puzzles and power-ups.
Crazy Chicken Jump'n Run - The Good, The Egg And The Ugly Original release date(s): October 13, 2005	System(s): PC - 2005; Nintendo Switch - 2021; PlayStation 4, PlayStation 5 - 2022; Steam - 2024	This Jump'n'run video game sees Moorhuhn Indy looking for the "Dingus/Thingy", a mysterious amulet lost in a jungle 1000 years ago. The game consists of 21 different levels filled with various enemies, which can be defeated by jumping, punching or shooting. Subsequent rereleases feature new bonus levels.
Crazy Chicken Jump'n Run - The Good, The Egg And The Ugly Original release date(s): October 13, 2005	Notes: Known as Moorhuhn Schatzjäger in German; PC version published by ak tronic Software & Services GmbH; A free, three-level-demo was available for download; Releases from the 2020s use different titles with variations of Crazy Chicken/Moorhuhn: Jump 'n' Run Traps and Treasures; Switch and Steam versions published by Higgs Games GmbH; PS4 and PS5 version published by Markt+Technik Verlag GmbH.	This Jump'n'run video game sees Moorhuhn Indy looking for the "Dingus/Thingy", a mysterious amulet lost in a jungle 1000 years ago. The game consists of 21 different levels filled with various enemies, which can be defeated by jumping, punching or shooting. Subsequent rereleases feature new bonus levels.
Moorhuhn The Good, The Egg and The Ugly Mobile Original release date(s): February 8, 2006	System(s): Java - 2006	While taking the story, gameplay and setting from The Good, The Egg And The Ugly, this game features twelve levels with unique level designs. It was awarded 2nd place in the category "Best Mobile RPG/Adventure Game“ by Deutscher Entwicklerpreis.
Moorhuhn The Good, The Egg and The Ugly Mobile Original release date(s): February 8, 2006	Notes: Also known as Moorhuhn Jump'n Run; Published by Mobile Gangsters	While taking the story, gameplay and setting from The Good, The Egg And The Ugly, this game features twelve levels with unique level designs. It was awarded 2nd place in the category "Best Mobile RPG/Adventure Game“ by Deutscher Entwicklerpreis.
Crazy Chicken Jump'n Run - Heart Of Tibet Original release date(s): October 13, 2006	System(s): PC - 2006; Nintendo Switch - 2022; PlayStation 4, PlayStation 5 - 2023; Steam - 2024	This sequel to The Good, The Egg And The Ugly plays similarly to its predecessor, featuring only a few core gameplay additions, such as hidden treasures which enable access to bonus areas inside the game's 21 levels once collected. Storywise, this game is set on the fictional Shlimalaya mountain, as Moorhuhn Indy tries to obtain the mythical "Heart of Tibet", which is hidden in a monastery.
Crazy Chicken Jump'n Run - Heart Of Tibet Original release date(s): October 13, 2006	Notes: Also known as Moorhuhn Schatzjäger 2 in German; PC version published by Phenomedia publishing GmbH; A free, three-level-demo was available for download; Releases from the 2020s use different titles with variations of Crazy Chicken/Moorhuhn: Jump 'n' Run Traps and Treasures 2; Switch and Steam versions published by Higgs Games GmbH; PS4 and PS5 version published by Markt+Technik Verlag GmbH.	This sequel to The Good, The Egg And The Ugly plays similarly to its predecessor, featuring only a few core gameplay additions, such as hidden treasures which enable access to bonus areas inside the game's 21 levels once collected. Storywise, this game is set on the fictional Shlimalaya mountain, as Moorhuhn Indy tries to obtain the mythical "Heart of Tibet", which is hidden in a monastery.
Crazy Chicken - The Winged Pharaoh Original release date(s): August 15, 2007	System(s): PC - 2007; Steam - 2024; Nintendo Switch - 2024; PlayStation 4, PlayStation 5 - 2025	On his mission to discover the lost tomb of Tut Chick Amun in Egypt and deliver it to a museum, Moorhuhn Indy has to look for clues spread out across 30 clay tablets. While still equipped with the same moves as in the previous games, players are now able to make use of a wider variety of items and objects related to Ancient Egyptian culture.
Crazy Chicken - The Winged Pharaoh Original release date(s): August 15, 2007	Notes: Also known as Moorhuhn Schatzjäger 3 in German; Published by Phenomedia publishing GmbH; A free, three-level-demo was available for download; Releases from the 2020s use different titles with variations of Crazy Chicken/Moorhuhn: Jump 'n' Run Traps and Treasures 3; Switch and Steam versions published by Higgs Games GmbH; PS4 and PS5 version published by Markt+Technik Verlag GmbH.	On his mission to discover the lost tomb of Tut Chick Amun in Egypt and deliver it to a museum, Moorhuhn Indy has to look for clues spread out across 30 clay tablets. While still equipped with the same moves as in the previous games, players are now able to make use of a wider variety of items and objects related to Ancient Egyptian culture.
Crazy Chicken Jump'n Run - Atlantis Original release date(s): July 15, 2008	System(s): PC - 2008; Nintendo DS - 2008	Searching the lost city of Atlantis, this game has Moorhuhn Indy venture through underwater levels for the first time. While many of the enemies and stage hazards are taken from previous entries in the series, Atlantis features many new items and - for the first time in the series - boss fights.
Crazy Chicken Jump'n Run - Atlantis Original release date(s): July 15, 2008	Notes: Also known as Moorhuhn Atlantis in German; Published by Phenomedia publishing GmbH; A free, three-level-demo was available for download	Searching the lost city of Atlantis, this game has Moorhuhn Indy venture through underwater levels for the first time. While many of the enemies and stage hazards are taken from previous entries in the series, Atlantis features many new items and - for the first time in the series - boss fights.

==== Sports series ====
Title	Details	Short description
Crazy Chicken Tennis Original release date(s): May 8, 2001	System(s): Browser - 2001; PC - 2005	A simple Tennis game, Crazy Chicken Tennis merely has the player move his respective chicken on a horizontal axis to hit the ball back and forth. Points are awarded for each hit, but the ball moves faster over time. After three misses, the match is over.
Crazy Chicken Tennis Original release date(s): May 8, 2001	Notes: Known as Moorhuhn Tennis in German; Published by Phenomedia publishing GmbH	A simple Tennis game, Crazy Chicken Tennis merely has the player move his respective chicken on a horizontal axis to hit the ball back and forth. Points are awarded for each hit, but the ball moves faster over time. After three misses, the match is over.
Crazy Chicken Soccer Original release date(s): April 28, 2006	System(s): PC - 2006	This Sports spin-off was released on the occasion of the 2006 FIFA World Cup in Germany. It consists of two mini games: Moor Kick (plays like a classic Crazy Chicken game, but in a soccer field setting with appropriate gimmicks and enemies) and Power Goal (balls have to be shot into the goal via an overhead kick with correct timing and power).
Crazy Chicken Soccer Original release date(s): April 28, 2006	Notes: Known as Moorhuhn Soccer in German; Published by Phenomedia publishing GmbH; The Moor Kick and Power Goal mini games received standalone Adobe Flash releases	This Sports spin-off was released on the occasion of the 2006 FIFA World Cup in Germany. It consists of two mini games: Moor Kick (plays like a classic Crazy Chicken game, but in a soccer field setting with appropriate gimmicks and enemies) and Power Goal (balls have to be shot into the goal via an overhead kick with correct timing and power).
Moorhuhn in Südafrika Original release date(s): April 28, 2010	System(s): PC - 2010	An updated version of Crazy Chicken Soccer. Specifically, the selectable teams (and thus, the chicken's player jerseys) as well as the background (now savanna-based) have been adjusted to resemble those of the 2010 FIFA World Cup in South Africa.
Moorhuhn in Südafrika Original release date(s): April 28, 2010	Notes: Published by Gamesload; The Moor Kick and Power Goal mini games received standalone Adobe Flash releases	An updated version of Crazy Chicken Soccer. Specifically, the selectable teams (and thus, the chicken's player jerseys) as well as the background (now savanna-based) have been adjusted to resemble those of the 2010 FIFA World Cup in South Africa.

==== Online gambling ====
Title	Details	Short description
Crazy Chicken Classic Original release date(s): unknown	Original System(s): Browser - unknown	Players have to pay 0.20€ for ten rounds of ammunition (with up to 100 rounds purchasable per game) to then gain as many points as possible in the setting of Crazy Chicken X. The more points earned, the more safes potentially containing payouts can be opened after the game.
Crazy Chicken Classic Original release date(s): unknown	Notes: Known as Moorhuhn Classic in German; Published by Glück Games Services GmbH	Players have to pay 0.20€ for ten rounds of ammunition (with up to 100 rounds purchasable per game) to then gain as many points as possible in the setting of Crazy Chicken X. The more points earned, the more safes potentially containing payouts can be opened after the game.
Crazy Chicken Extreme Original release date(s): unknown	Original System(s): Browser - unknown	The same game as Crazy Chicken Classic, except for the fact that, while payouts are rarer, they are also higher.
Crazy Chicken Extreme Original release date(s): unknown	Notes: Known as Moorhuhn Extreme in German; Published by Glück Games Services GmbH	The same game as Crazy Chicken Classic, except for the fact that, while payouts are rarer, they are also higher.
Moorhuhn Scratchcard Original release date(s): March 2017	Original System(s): Browser - 2017	By betting 0.70€ per game, players have to clear 9 spaces off their scratch card in hopes of receiving 3 matching symbols; the number of money written on which they then receive as payout.
Moorhuhn Scratchcard Original release date(s): March 2017	Notes: Known as Moorhuhn Rubellos in German; Published by Glück Games Services GmbH	By betting 0.70€ per game, players have to clear 9 spaces off their scratch card in hopes of receiving 3 matching symbols; the number of money written on which they then receive as payout.
Golden Ei of Moorhuhn Original release date(s): April 2017	Original System(s): Browser - 2017	A rebranded version of the Eye of Horus slot machine, this online gambling software encourages players to bet anywhere from 0.05€ to 100€ per game on a five-wheel level.
Golden Ei of Moorhuhn Original release date(s): April 2017	Notes: Published by Bally Wulff	A rebranded version of the Eye of Horus slot machine, this online gambling software encourages players to bet anywhere from 0.05€ to 100€ per game on a five-wheel level.
Book of Moorhuhn Original release date(s): April 2017	Original System(s): Browser - 2017; iOS, Android - 2017	A rebranded version of the Book of Ra slot machine, this online gambling software encourages players to bet anywhere from 0.10€ to 100€ per game on a five-wheel level.
Book of Moorhuhn Original release date(s): April 2017	Notes: Published by Bally Wulff	A rebranded version of the Book of Ra slot machine, this online gambling software encourages players to bet anywhere from 0.10€ to 100€ per game on a five-wheel level.
Super Duper Moorhuhn Original release date(s): April 2017	Original System(s): Browser - 2017; iOS, Android - 2017	A rebranded version of the Super Duper Cherry slot machine, this online gambling software encourages players to either bet real money or enter a match with the only stakes being in fictional currency, the latter of which serves to introduce players to this game's "Extra Eggs Power" gimmick.
Super Duper Moorhuhn Original release date(s): April 2017	Notes: Published by Bally Wulff	A rebranded version of the Super Duper Cherry slot machine, this online gambling software encourages players to either bet real money or enter a match with the only stakes being in fictional currency, the latter of which serves to introduce players to this game's "Extra Eggs Power" gimmick.
Moorhuhn UnFairPlay Original release date(s): December 23, 2018	Original System(s): Browser - 2018	An online version of the board game Mensch ärgere Dich nicht with Crazy Chicken branding. While there is a free demo mode, the main aim of the game is to have anywhere from 2-4 players wager real-life currency, which is then divided between the winner and the distributor.
Moorhuhn UnFairPlay Original release date(s): December 23, 2018	Notes: Published by Moorhuhn GmbH	An online version of the board game Mensch ärgere Dich nicht with Crazy Chicken branding. While there is a free demo mode, the main aim of the game is to have anywhere from 2-4 players wager real-life currency, which is then divided between the winner and the distributor.

==== Non-Chicken Spin-Offs ====
Title	Details	Short description
'Sink' The Fish Original release date(s): August 29, 2001	System(s): Browser - 2001	A promotional game for Crazy Chicken 3, taking place in the same setting as the former. Players simply have to place dynamite anywhere in a lake, blow it up and hope that as many fish as possible float up to the surface.
'Sink' The Fish Original release date(s): August 29, 2001	Notes: Known as Fische versenken in German; Published by Phenomedia AG	A promotional game for Crazy Chicken 3, taking place in the same setting as the former. Players simply have to place dynamite anywhere in a lake, blow it up and hope that as many fish as possible float up to the surface.
Snail Trainer Original release date(s): February 19, 2003	System(s): Browser - 2003	A promotional game for Crazy Chicken X, taking place in the same setting as the former. The player has to shoot the snail's foot multiple times in order to propel it towards an apple on the other side of the screen. The challenge of the game is derived from the fact that, while precision is required only hit the snail's foot and nothing else, points are awarded based on how fast the snail was brought to the apple.
Snail Trainer Original release date(s): February 19, 2003	Notes: Known as Schneckentrainer in German; Published by Phenomedia publishing GmbH	A promotional game for Crazy Chicken X, taking place in the same setting as the former. The player has to shoot the snail's foot multiple times in order to propel it towards an apple on the other side of the screen. The challenge of the game is derived from the fact that, while precision is required only hit the snail's foot and nothing else, points are awarded based on how fast the snail was brought to the apple.
Moorfrog Original release date(s): September 17, 2003	System(s): PC - 2003	This adaptation of Frogger has Crazy Chicken 3's original Moorfrog character traverse various streets and rivers to reach his spawning ground, having to evade larger animals or man-made objects while eating insects to increase the score. On November 20, 2004 an official patch was released that added an infinite arcade mode.
Moorfrog Original release date(s): September 17, 2003	Notes: Known as Moorfrosch in German; Published by ak tronic Software & Services GmbH; Available in XS (free demo), XL (5€) and XXL (full game) versions	This adaptation of Frogger has Crazy Chicken 3's original Moorfrog character traverse various streets and rivers to reach his spawning ground, having to evade larger animals or man-made objects while eating insects to increase the score. On November 20, 2004 an official patch was released that added an infinite arcade mode.
'Sink' The Fish - Spy Kit Original release date(s): November 4, 2003	System(s): Browser - 2003	An online adaptation of Battleship using 'Sink' The Fish aesthetics, with players being able to duel other users after registering (for a 0.49€ fee).
'Sink' The Fish - Spy Kit Original release date(s): November 4, 2003	Notes: Known as Fische versenken - Spy Kit in German; Published by Phenomedia publishing GmbH	An online adaptation of Battleship using 'Sink' The Fish aesthetics, with players being able to duel other users after registering (for a 0.49€ fee).
Turtle Bay Original release date(s): May 13, 2004	System(s): PC - 2004	After alien octopuses have taken over several bays in the Caribbean, Amazon and Antarctica, abducting and freezing Kroet's fellow sea creatures in the process, it is up to the player to stop their spread by propelling Kroet into the octopuses while they are pupating.
Turtle Bay Original release date(s): May 13, 2004	Notes: Known as Kröt - Monster, Minen & Raketen in German; Published by Phenomedia publishing GmbH	After alien octopuses have taken over several bays in the Caribbean, Amazon and Antarctica, abducting and freezing Kroet's fellow sea creatures in the process, it is up to the player to stop their spread by propelling Kroet into the octopuses while they are pupating.
Hank Original release date(s): June 15, 2005	System(s): PC - 2005	A maze game reminiscent of Dig Dug starring the titular mole Hank. The aim of the game is to collect a certain amount of gold nuggets in each of the 25 levels, which are guarded by the Uru, a fictional race of earth spirits.
Hank Original release date(s): June 15, 2005	Notes: Published by Phenomedia publishing GmbH; Available in XS (free demo), XL (5€) and XXL (full game) versions	A maze game reminiscent of Dig Dug starring the titular mole Hank. The aim of the game is to collect a certain amount of gold nuggets in each of the 25 levels, which are guarded by the Uru, a fictional race of earth spirits.

==== Others ====
Title	Details	Short description
Crazy Chicken Solitaire Online Original release date(s): unknown	System(s): Browser - unknown	A video game adaptation of the classic card game Solitaire with Crazy Chicken branding.
Crazy Chicken Solitaire Online Original release date(s): unknown	Notes: Known as Moorhuhn Solitaire in German; Published by Phenomedia AG	A video game adaptation of the classic card game Solitaire with Crazy Chicken branding.
Crazy Chicken Slotmachine Original release date(s): unknown	System(s): Browser - unknown	A digital one-armed bandit, specifically designed to not involve any real currency, with players only able to "lose [their] non-existing fortune of Chicken-Dollars". It is the only designated Crazy Chicken slot machine to not include any monetisation at all.
Crazy Chicken Slotmachine Original release date(s): unknown	Notes: Known as Moorhuhn Slotmachine in German; Published by Phenomedia AG	A digital one-armed bandit, specifically designed to not involve any real currency, with players only able to "lose [their] non-existing fortune of Chicken-Dollars". It is the only designated Crazy Chicken slot machine to not include any monetisation at all.
Moorhuhn Training Area 1 Original release date(s): April 17, 2000	System(s): Browser - 2000	A very simple shooting mini game meant two serve as training for the first German Crazy Chicken Championship. Flattened tin cans resembling Crazy Chickens suddenly spin around and have to be shot when directly facing the player.
Moorhuhn Training Area 1 Original release date(s): April 17, 2000	Notes: Published by Phenomedia AG	A very simple shooting mini game meant two serve as training for the first German Crazy Chicken Championship. Flattened tin cans resembling Crazy Chickens suddenly spin around and have to be shot when directly facing the player.
Moorhuhn Training Area 2 Original release date(s): April 17, 2000	System(s): Browser - 2000	A very simple shooting mini game meant two serve as training for the first German Crazy Chicken Championship. It has cardboard cutouts popping up from below the screen and hiding behind bushes, intended to train players to shoot as quickly as possible.
Moorhuhn Training Area 2 Original release date(s): April 17, 2000	Notes: Published by Phenomedia AG	A very simple shooting mini game meant two serve as training for the first German Crazy Chicken Championship. It has cardboard cutouts popping up from below the screen and hiding behind bushes, intended to train players to shoot as quickly as possible.
Moorhen Black Jack Original release date(s): April 2002	System(s): i-mode - 2001	A video game adaptation of the classic card game Black Jack with Crazy Chicken branding.
Moorhen Black Jack Original release date(s): April 2002	Notes: Known as Moorhuhn Black Jack in German; Published by Mobile Scope AG	A video game adaptation of the classic card game Black Jack with Crazy Chicken branding.
My Moorhen / Moorhen Evolution Original release date(s): April 2002	System(s): i-mode - 2002	A pet simulator inspired by Tamagotchi. The player is tasked with caring for a young Crazy Chicken, having to feed and play with it in order to keep it healthy and happy.
My Moorhen / Moorhen Evolution Original release date(s): April 2002	Notes: Known as Mein Moorhuhn in German; Published by Mobile Scope AG	A pet simulator inspired by Tamagotchi. The player is tasked with caring for a young Crazy Chicken, having to feed and play with it in order to keep it healthy and happy.
Moorhen Battle Arena Original release date(s): April 2002	System(s): i-mode - 2002	A 2D fighting game featuring a traditional arcade mode, training mode and multiplayer mode. Aside from the characters unlocked in the arcade mode, players can even use their own custom characters created in My Moorhen.
Moorhen Battle Arena Original release date(s): April 2002	Notes: Known as Moorhuhn Battle Arena in German; Published by Mobile Scope AG	A 2D fighting game featuring a traditional arcade mode, training mode and multiplayer mode. Aside from the characters unlocked in the arcade mode, players can even use their own custom characters created in My Moorhen.
Moorhen: Trapped! Original release date(s): June 2002	System(s): WAP - 2002	A puzzle game that has the player assist Crazy Chickens to escape hunters while avoiding obstacles such as rolling boulders. Collecting grain-filled bags increases the player's score.
Moorhen: Trapped! Original release date(s): June 2002	Notes: Known as Moorhuhn: Trapped! in German; Published by Mobile Scope AG	A puzzle game that has the player assist Crazy Chickens to escape hunters while avoiding obstacles such as rolling boulders. Collecting grain-filled bags increases the player's score.
Moorhen Playsuit Original release date(s): November 2002	System(s): Java - 2002	A combination of traditional dice-based board games with Crazy Chicken-themed minigames, where players have to earn as many points as possible before reaching the end of the board. Different spaces have various effects when landed on.
Moorhen Playsuit Original release date(s): November 2002	Notes: Known as Moorhuhn Playsuit in German; Published by Mobile Scope AG	A combination of traditional dice-based board games with Crazy Chicken-themed minigames, where players have to earn as many points as possible before reaching the end of the board. Different spaces have various effects when landed on.
Moorhuhn Adventure HIQU - Das Spiel der Pharaonen Original release date(s): 2004	System(s): Browser - 2004	A puzzle game that has players assemble a given shape out of four puzzle pieces as fast as possible. The pieces can be rotated to fit the over 100 different shapes. The game's graphics and sound are designed to resemble those of Crazy Chicken Adventure - The Pharao's Treasure.
Moorhuhn Adventure HIQU - Das Spiel der Pharaonen Original release date(s): 2004	Notes: Published by Phenomedia publishing GmbH	A puzzle game that has players assemble a given shape out of four puzzle pieces as fast as possible. The pieces can be rotated to fit the over 100 different shapes. The game's graphics and sound are designed to resemble those of Crazy Chicken Adventure - The Pharao's Treasure.
Crazy Chicken Pinball Vol. 1 Original release date(s): December 2, 2004	System(s): PC - 2004	Simulating a real Pinball machine, this game offers five different virtual tables - most of them based on previous games in the franchise - which allow players to earn points by hitting bumpers, wormholes and solving puzzles.
Crazy Chicken Pinball Vol. 1 Original release date(s): December 2, 2004	Notes: Known as Moorhuhn Pinball Vol. 1 in German; Published by ak tronic Software & Services GmbH; Available in XS (free demo) and XXL (full game) versions	Simulating a real Pinball machine, this game offers five different virtual tables - most of them based on previous games in the franchise - which allow players to earn points by hitting bumpers, wormholes and solving puzzles.
Crazy Chicken Action - SkyBotz Original release date(s): December 15, 2005	System(s): PC - 2005	An expanded, 17-level-long version of the Scrolling Shooter mini games from the Moorhuhn Adventure series, this game has Moorhuhn Indy shooting down an alien robot army from his plane to recover his stolen hat.
Crazy Chicken Action - SkyBotz Original release date(s): December 15, 2005	Notes: Known as Moorhuhn im Anflug in German; Published by Phenomedia publishing GmbH	An expanded, 17-level-long version of the Scrolling Shooter mini games from the Moorhuhn Adventure series, this game has Moorhuhn Indy shooting down an alien robot army from his plane to recover his stolen hat.
Crazy Chicken Mah-Jongg Original release date(s): March 20, 2006	System(s): PC - 2006; Browser - 2006	A digital version of mahjong with a range of selectable themes, motives and music based on various other games in the Crazy Chicken franchise.
Crazy Chicken Mah-Jongg Original release date(s): March 20, 2006	Notes: Known as Moorhuhn Mah-Jongg in German; Published by rondomedia	A digital version of mahjong with a range of selectable themes, motives and music based on various other games in the Crazy Chicken franchise.
Moorhuhn Spacemission Original release date(s): December 2006	System(s): Java - 2006	Storywise, while on a space walk, the Crazy Chicken forgot his 1.7billion-digit entry code to access his vessel. It is now up to the player to solve the code by matching graphical symbols instead, before their oxygen tank is depleted.
Moorhuhn Spacemission Original release date(s): December 2006	Notes: Known as Moorhuhn May-Jongg in German; Published by Phenomedia publishing GmbH	Storywise, while on a space walk, the Crazy Chicken forgot his 1.7billion-digit entry code to access his vessel. It is now up to the player to solve the code by matching graphical symbols instead, before their oxygen tank is depleted.
Crazy Chicken - The Jewel of Darkness Original release date(s): June 7, 2007	System(s): PC - 2007; Nintendo DS - 2008	This puzzle game inspired by Beetle Bug 2 has players navigate a maze by pushing blocks and finding items. To progress to the next of 150 levels, players have to defeat each enemy (most which are taken from the Crazy Chicken Jump'n Run series) in their given section. The game's plot centers around Moorhuhn Indy following a map supposedly leading to a magic jewel. The DS version only features 60 levels.
Crazy Chicken - The Jewel of Darkness Original release date(s): June 7, 2007	Notes: Known as Moorhuhn - Juwel der Finsternis in German; Published by Intenium	This puzzle game inspired by Beetle Bug 2 has players navigate a maze by pushing blocks and finding items. To progress to the next of 150 levels, players have to defeat each enemy (most which are taken from the Crazy Chicken Jump'n Run series) in their given section. The game's plot centers around Moorhuhn Indy following a map supposedly leading to a magic jewel. The DS version only features 60 levels.
Crazy Chicken DS / Chicken Hunter Original release date(s): December 14, 2007	Original System(s): Nintendo DS - 2007	A compilation of five mini games. The game's Classic Shooter mini game is a conversion of Crazy Chicken X. The others are Gems (a match-three game), Weights (an accuracy-shooting game), Hotwire (an experimental tightrope/racing game), and Spot the Difference.
Crazy Chicken DS / Chicken Hunter Original release date(s): December 14, 2007	Notes: Known as Moorhuhn DS in German; Published by Phenomedia publishing GmbH; The Spot the Difference (Original und Fälschung in German) mini game saw a standalone release as a free browser game	A compilation of five mini games. The game's Classic Shooter mini game is a conversion of Crazy Chicken X. The others are Gems (a match-three game), Weights (an accuracy-shooting game), Hotwire (an experimental tightrope/racing game), and Spot the Difference.
Crazy Chicken Tales Original release date(s): November 20, 2009	Original System(s): Nintendo Wii - 2009; PC - 2010	A 3D platformer heavily inspired by the Crash Bandicoot series. While the adventure to and through the Forsaken Castle is mostly played as the Crazy Chicken, "vehicle sections", where the player rides on Kroet, Moorfrog or Rambock are included as well. These levels are also used in the game's split-screen multiplayer mode.
Crazy Chicken Tales Original release date(s): November 20, 2009	Notes: Known as Moorhuhn - Das verbotene Schloss in German; Published by Phenomedia publishing GmbH	A 3D platformer heavily inspired by the Crash Bandicoot series. While the adventure to and through the Forsaken Castle is mostly played as the Crazy Chicken, "vehicle sections", where the player rides on Kroet, Moorfrog or Rambock are included as well. These levels are also used in the game's split-screen multiplayer mode.
Crazy Chicken Carnival Original release date(s): September 10, 2010	Original System(s): Nintendo Wii - 2010; Nintendo DS - 2010	A multiplayer party game featuring 25 mini games. Set on an amusement park occupied by an evil sorcerer and his minions.
Crazy Chicken Carnival Original release date(s): September 10, 2010	Notes: Known as Moorhuhn Jahrmarkt-Party in German; Published by dtp entertainment AG	A multiplayer party game featuring 25 mini games. Set on an amusement park occupied by an evil sorcerer and his minions.
Crazy Chicken Quest Original release date(s): December 3, 2010	Original System(s): iOS - 2010	A tile-based puzzle game that has Moorhuhn Indy traverse 80 bite-sized levels, with the challenge being derived from the fact that certain power-ups have to applied with the appropriate timing.
Crazy Chicken Quest Original release date(s): December 3, 2010	Notes: Known as Moorhuhn Quest in German; Published by Phenomedia publishing GmbH	A tile-based puzzle game that has Moorhuhn Indy traverse 80 bite-sized levels, with the challenge being derived from the fact that certain power-ups have to applied with the appropriate timing.
Crazy Chicken Combat Original release date(s): September 15, 2011	Original System(s): Browser - 2011	A free-to-play MMORPG featuring a variety of classes the player's Crazy Chicken can become. Each player may also choose one of two tribes to be a part of, with each side competing to see which one is worthy to defeat an evil pig subjugating the chicken race. The game was discontinued in 2012.
Crazy Chicken Combat Original release date(s): September 15, 2011	Notes: Known as Moorhuhn Combat in German; Published by Bigpoint	A free-to-play MMORPG featuring a variety of classes the player's Crazy Chicken can become. Each player may also choose one of two tribes to be a part of, with each side competing to see which one is worthy to defeat an evil pig subjugating the chicken race. The game was discontinued in 2012.
Crazy Chicken: Tiger & Chicken Original release date(s): September 5, 2013	Original System(s): iOS - 2013; PC - 2013; Steam - 2014	After numerous delays, this Hack and slash game set in East Asia was supposed to "usher in a new era". It had a far higher budget and grittier story than any prior game in the franchise, even touching on themes of slavery and exploitation.
Crazy Chicken: Tiger & Chicken Original release date(s): September 5, 2013	Notes: Known as Moorhuhn - Tiger & Chicken in German; Published by Deep Silver	After numerous delays, this Hack and slash game set in East Asia was supposed to "usher in a new era". It had a far higher budget and grittier story than any prior game in the franchise, even touching on themes of slavery and exploitation.
Crazy Chicken Strikes Back Original release date(s): August 16, 2016	Original System(s): iOS, Android - 2016; PC - 2016; Steam - 2016; Nintendo Switch - 2017	A mix of the tower defense and puzzle genres reminiscent of Martial Towers revolving around Crazy Chicken returning to his home in Scotland, only to find it overtaken by a rival clan, which he seeks to drive out. The game features up to 2-player-multiplayer.
Crazy Chicken Strikes Back Original release date(s): August 16, 2016	Notes: Known as Moorhuhn schlägt zurück in German; Steam and Switch versions published by Higgs Games; The Switch version is called Moorhuhn Knights & Castles; All other versions published by Young Fun Studio	A mix of the tower defense and puzzle genres reminiscent of Martial Towers revolving around Crazy Chicken returning to his home in Scotland, only to find it overtaken by a rival clan, which he seeks to drive out. The game features up to 2-player-multiplayer.

=== Collections and bundles ===
A variety of collections and bundles containing the franchise's games have been released over the years. The following tables signify a full game's inclusion with a green checkmark, the inclusion of a demo version of a game with a yellow checkmark and a game not being included with a red cross.

2000-2005
Included games	Best of Moorhuhn (2000)	Best of Moorhuhn (2001)	Moorhuhn ohne Ende (2002) / Moorhuhn Classic Games (2002) / Moorhuhn 4 Teile (2003)	Moorhuhn präsentiert: 10 Fun Games (2003)	Moorhuhn Total (2004)	Moorhuhn präsentiert: 10 Fun Games (2004)	Moorhuhn Total 2 (2005)	Moorhuhn präsentiert: Die Funbox (2005)	Moorhuhn-Osteredition (2005) / Moorhuhn Fun-Special (2005)	Moorhuhn 2000-2005: Jubiläums-Edition (2005)
The Original Crazy Chicken Hunt (1999)	Yes	Yes	Yes	Yes	Yes	Yes	Yes	No	Yes	Yes
Crazy Chicken 2 (2000)	Yes	Yes	Yes	No	Yes	No	No	Yes	Yes	No
Crazy Chicken Winter Edition (2001)	No	Yes	Yes	No	Yes	No	Yes	No	No	No
Crazy Chicken 3 (2001)	No	No	Yes	No	Yes	No	No	No	Yes	No
Crazy Chicken X (2003)	No	No	No	No	Maybe	No	Maybe	No	No	Maybe
Crazy Chicken Wanted (2004)	No	No	No	No	No	No	Maybe	Maybe	No	No
Crazy Chicken Remake (2005)	No	No	No	No	No	No	No	No	No	Yes
Crazy Chicken Kart Classic (2002)	No	No	No	Maybe	Yes	Maybe	No	No	No	No
Crazy Chicken Kart Extra (2003)	No	No	No	No	No	No	Yes	No	No	No
Crazy Chicken Kart 2 (2004)	No	No	No	No	No	No	Maybe	Maybe	No	No
Crazy Chicken Adventure - The Pharao's Treasure (2003)	No	No	No	No	No	No	Maybe	No	No	No
Crazy Chicken Adventure - Cursed Gold (2005)	No	No	No	No	No	No	Maybe	No	Yes	Maybe
Crazy Chicken Tennis (2001)	No	No	No	Yes	Yes	Yes	No	Yes	No	No
'Sink' the Fish (2001)	No	No	No	No	No	Yes	No	No	No	No
Snail Trainer (2003)	No	No	No	No	No	No	No	Yes	No	No
Moorfrog (2003)	No	No	No	No	No	No	Yes	Maybe	No	No
Hank (2005)	No	No	No	No	No	No	No	No	No	Maybe
Moorhuhn Adventure HIQU - Das Spiel der Pharaonen (2004)	No	No	No	No	No	No	No	No	Yes	No
Crazy Chicken Pinball Vol. 1 (2004)	No	No	No	No	No	No	Maybe	No	No	No
Games outside the Crazy Chicken franchise	No	No	No	Yes	No	Yes	No	Yes	No	Yes

2006-2008
Included games	Moorhuhn Bundle (2006)	Moorhuhn and Friends (2006)	Moorhuhn Sammelbox: Big Adventure (2006)	Moorhuhn präsentiert: 10 Fun Games 2 (2006) / Moorhuhn präsentiert: Fun Games 2007 (2007)	Moorhuhn Kart Racerbox (2006)	Moorhuhn Total 3 (2006)	Moorhuhn präsentiert: Die große Moorhuhn-Fun-Box (2007)	Moorhuhn Total 4 (2007)	Moorhuhn Explosiv (2008)	Moorhuhn Total 5 (2008)
The Original Crazy Chicken Hunt (1999)	Yes	No	No	No	No	No	No	Yes	No	No
Crazy Chicken 2 (2000)	Yes	No	No	Yes	No	No	Yes	No	No	No
Crazy Chicken Winter Edition (2001)	No	No	No	No	No	Yes	No	No	No	No
Crazy Chicken 3 (2001)	Yes	No	No	No	No	Yes	No	No	No	No
Crazy Chicken X (2003)	No	Yes	No	No	No	No	No	No	Yes	No
Crazy Chicken Wanted (2004)	No	No	No	Maybe	No	No	Maybe	No	Yes	Yes
Crazy Chicken Remake (2005)	No	No	No	No	No	Yes	No	No	No	No
Crazy Chicken Invasion (2005)	Maybe	No	No	No	No	Yes	No	No	No	No
Crazy Chicken 1984 (2005)	No	No	No	Yes	No	Yes	Yes	No	No	No
Crazy Chicken Pirates (2006)	No	No	No	No	No	No	No	Yes	Yes	No
Crazy Chicken Director's Cut (2007)	No	No	No	No	No	No	No	No	No	Yes
Crazy Chicken Kart Classic (2002)	No	No	No	No	Yes	No	Yes	No	Yes	No
Crazy Chicken Kart Extra (2003)	No	No	No	No	Yes	No	Yes	Yes	No	No
Crazy Chicken Kart 2 (2004)	No	No	No	No	Yes	Yes	Yes	Yes	No	No
Crazy Chicken Kart 3 (2007)	No	No	No	No	No	No	No	No	No	Yes
Crazy Chicken Adventure - The Pharao's Treasure (2003)	No	No	Yes	No	No	No	No	Yes	Yes	No
Crazy Chicken Adventure - Cursed Gold (2005)	No	No	Yes	No	No	No	No	Yes	No	No
Crazy Chicken Jump'n Run - The Good, The Egg And The Ugly (2005)	No	No	No	No	No	Maybe	No	Yes	No	No
Crazy Chicken Jump'n Run - Heart Of Tibet (2006)	No	No	No	No	No	No	No	No	No	Yes
Crazy Chicken - The Winged Pharao (2007)	No	No	No	No	No	No	No	No	Yes	No
Crazy Chicken Tennis (2001)	No	No	No	No	No	Yes	No	No	No	No
Crazy Chicken Soccer (2006)	No	No	No	No	No	No	No	No	Yes	Yes
Snail Trainer (2003)	No	No	No	Yes	No	No	Yes	No	No	No
Moorfrog (2003)	No	Yes	No	Maybe	No	No	Maybe	No	No	Yes
Turtle Bay (2005)	No	Yes	No	No	No	No	No	No	No	No
Hank (2005)	No	No	No	No	No	No	No	No	No	Yes
Moorhuhn Adventure HIQU - Das Spiel der Pharaonen (2004)	No	No	No	Yes	No	No	Yes	No	No	No
Crazy Chicken Pinball Vol. 1 (2004)	No	No	No	Maybe	No	Yes	Yes	Yes	No	No
Crazy Chicken Action - SkyBotz (2005)	No	No	No	No	No	Maybe	No	Yes	No	No
Crazy Chicken Mah-Jongg (2006)	No	No	No	No	No	No	Yes	No	No	Yes
Games outside the Crazy Chicken franchise	No	No	No	Yes	No	No	Yes	No	No	No

2010-2016
Included games	Moorhuhn 10 Jahre Jubiläumsedition (2010)	Moorhuhn Gamesload Geburtstagspaket (2010)	Moorhuhn Gamesload Racingpaket (2010)	Moorhuhn: Die doppelte Ladung (2014)	Moorhuhn Complete (2016)
The Original Crazy Chicken Hunt (1999)	Yes	No	No	No	Yes
Crazy Chicken 2 (2000)	Yes	No	No	No	Yes
Crazy Chicken Winter Edition (2001)	Yes	Yes	No	No	Yes
Crazy Chicken 3 (2001)	Yes	No	No	No	Yes
Crazy Chicken X (2003)	Yes	Yes	No	No	Yes
Crazy Chicken Wanted (2004)	Yes	No	No	No	Yes
Crazy Chicken Remake (2005)	Yes	No	No	No	Yes
Crazy Chicken Invasion (2005)	Yes	No	No	No	Yes
Crazy Chicken Pirates (2006)	Yes	No	No	No	Yes
Crazy Chicken Director's Cut (2007)	Yes	No	No	No	Yes
Crazy Chicken Kart Classic (2002)	Yes	No	No	No	Yes
Crazy Chicken Kart Extra (2003)	Yes	No	Yes	No	Yes
Crazy Chicken Kart 2 (2004)	Yes	No	No	No	Yes
Crazy Chicken Kart 3 (2007)	Yes	No	No	No	Yes
Crazy Chicken Kart Thunder (2008)	Yes	No	Yes	No	Yes
Crazy Chicken Adventure - The Pharao's Treasure (2003)	Yes	No	No	No	Yes
Crazy Chicken Adventure - Cursed Gold (2005)	Yes	No	No	No	Yes
Crazy Chicken Jump'n Run - The Good, The Egg And The Ugly (2005)	Yes	No	No	No	Yes
Crazy Chicken Jump'n Run - Heart Of Tibet (2006)	Yes	No	No	No	Yes
Crazy Chicken - The Winged Pharao (2007)	Yes	No	No	No	Yes
Crazy Chicken Jump'n Run - Atlantis (2008)	Yes	No	No	No	Yes
Crazy Chicken Tales (2009)	No	No	No	Yes	Yes
Crazy Chicken: Tiger & Chicken (2013)	No	No	No	Yes	Yes

2020
Included games	Moorhuhn Shooter Edition (2020)	Moorhuhn Klassiker Paket (2020)	Moorhuhn Kart Paket (2020)	Moorhuhn Kart & Klassiker Paket (2020)	Moorhuhn Adventure Paket (2020)	Moorhuhn Kart & Adventure Paket (2020)	Moorhuhn Schatzjäger Paket (2020)
The Original Crazy Chicken Hunt (1999)	No	Yes	No	No	No	No	No
Crazy Chicken 2 (2000)	No	Yes	No	No	No	No	No
Crazy Chicken Winter Edition (2001)	No	Yes	No	No	No	No	No
Crazy Chicken 3 (2001)	No	Yes	No	Yes	No	No	No
Crazy Chicken X (2003)	No	Yes	No	Yes	No	No	No
Crazy Chicken Wanted (2004)	Yes	Yes	No	No	No	No	No
Crazy Chicken Remake (2005)	Yes	Yes	No	Yes	No	No	No
Crazy Chicken Invasion (2005)	No	Yes	No	Yes	No	No	No
Crazy Chicken Pirates (2006)	No	Yes	No	No	No	No	No
Crazy Chicken Director's Cut (2007)	No	Yes	No	No	No	No	No
Crazy Chicken Kart Classic (2002)	No	No	No	Yes	No	Yes	No
Crazy Chicken Kart Extra (2003)	No	No	Yes	No	No	No	No
Crazy Chicken Kart 2 (2004)	No	No	Yes	Yes	No	Yes	No
Crazy Chicken Kart 3 (2007)	No	No	Yes	Yes	No	Yes	No
Crazy Chicken Kart Thunder (2008)	No	No	Yes	Yes	No	No	No
Crazy Chicken Adventure - The Pharao's Treasure (2003)	No	No	No	No	Yes	Yes	No
Crazy Chicken Adventure - Cursed Gold (2005)	No	No	No	No	Yes	Yes	No
Crazy Chicken Jump'n Run - The Good, The Egg And The Ugly (2005)	No	No	No	No	No	No	Yes
Crazy Chicken Jump'n Run - Heart Of Tibet (2006)	No	No	No	No	No	No	Yes
Crazy Chicken - The Winged Pharao (2007)	No	No	No	No	No	Yes	Yes
Crazy Chicken Jump'n Run - Atlantis (2008)	No	No	No	No	Yes	No	No
Crazy Chicken Tales (2009)	No	No	No	No	Yes	No	No

2021-2022
Included games	Moorhuhn Vol. 1 (2021)	Moorhuhn Vol. 2 (2021)	Moorhuhn Kart Vol. 3 (2021)	Das Moorhuhn Paket (2022)
The Original Crazy Chicken Hunt (1999)	Yes	No	No	Yes
Crazy Chicken 2 (2000)	Yes	No	No	No
Crazy Chicken Winter Edition (2001)	Yes	No	No	No
Crazy Chicken 3 (2001)	Yes	No	No	No
Crazy Chicken X (2003)	No	Yes	No	No
Crazy Chicken Wanted (2004)	No	Yes	No	Yes
Crazy Chicken Remake (2005)	Yes	No	No	No
Crazy Chicken Invasion (2005)	Yes	No	No	No
Crazy Chicken Pirates (2006)	Yes	No	No	No
Crazy Chicken Director's Cut (2007)	Yes	No	No	No
Crazy Chicken Kart Classic (2002)	No	Yes	No	Yes
Crazy Chicken Kart Extra (2003)	No	Yes	No	No
Crazy Chicken Kart 2 (2004)	No	Yes	No	No
Crazy Chicken Kart 3 (2007)	No	Yes	No	No
Crazy Chicken Kart Thunder (2008)	No	Yes	No	No
Crazy Chicken Adventure - The Pharao's Treasure (2003)	No	No	Yes	No
Crazy Chicken Adventure - Cursed Gold (2005)	No	No	Yes	No
Crazy Chicken Jump'n Run - The Good, The Egg And The Ugly (2005)	No	No	Yes	Yes
Crazy Chicken Jump'n Run - Heart Of Tibet (2006)	No	No	Yes	No
Crazy Chicken - The Winged Pharao (2007)	No	No	Yes	No
Crazy Chicken Jump'n Run - Atlantis (2008)	No	No	Yes	Yes
Crazy Chicken Tales (2009)	No	No	Yes	Yes
Crazy Chicken: Tiger & Chicken (2013)	No	No	Yes	No

== Other media ==
The game's success spawned a great deal of merchandise, a comic book series, an animated TV series, several motion picture scripts (although no movie was ever made) and a BMG-produced single (Gimme more Huhn by comedian Wigald Boning).

=== Game soundtrack ===
Nils Fritze was the composer of all Crazy Chicken games since Crazy Chicken Winter Edition (2001) until mid-2006. Georg Heckermann and Gunther Glöckner were responsible for the soundtrack of Crazy Chicken Jump'n Run - Heart Of Tibet, Henrik Jacoby for Crazy Chicken - The Winged Pharaoh and Kai Walter (Snap Dragon Games) for the sequel Crazy Chicken Atlantis. Crazy Chicken Kart 3, Thunder as well as Director's Cut were scored by Haiko Ruttmann.

The soundtrack for the game Crazy Chicken: Tiger & Chicken was composed by Jan Klose/Tilman Sillescu (Dynamedion), Helge Borgarts contributed some tracks. The soundtrack was played by the Staatskapelle Halle.

=== Short films ===
In 2001, a total of 26 one-minute animated shorts were produced, which were shown in commercial breaks of German TV stations. In these shorts, the Crazy Chicken character was voiced by Santiago Ziesmer, though it only made chicken noises.

=== Movie ===
In September 2011, the production of a Moorhuhn feature film was announced by Phenomedia. The film was to be produced by Douglas Welbat and Nova Entertainment Cinema. A year later, the script was funded with a grant of 45,000 euros from the public Filmförderungsanstalt (FFA), at the time the highest funding of the Screenplay Commission. Nothing more came of the project.

== Reception ==
=== Commercial performance ===
Despite mass interest in the franchise originally being caused by the distribution of its early titles as free software via the internet, it managed to retain some relevancy even after the so-called "Moorhuhn-Boom" period in the early 2000s. For example, as of 2013, paid video games using the "Moorhuhn" branding have accumulated over 15 million sold copies, while free demo versions have been downloaded approximately 80 million times from official sources alone. At the same time, the series has struggled with proper monetisation of its games since its inception. For example, while the official PC release of Crazy Chicken 2 (retailing at a MSRP of 20 Mark) has sold over 300,000 copies, on launch day, a free version was reportedly downloaded 180,000 times per hour; a rate high enough to completely crash some of Germany's main IXPs in Frankfurt and Hamburg.

In terms of the original game's purpose as marketing for Johnnie Walker whisky, a 2003 study by the University of Mannheim found that test subjects who had already played the game perceived the Johnnie Walker brand as more modern and trendy. Despite coming to the conclusion that the game had no significant impact on general awareness of the brand or customer's purchasing intent, the study noted that the establishment of the Crazy Chicken as a new brand image was far quicker than similar efforts undertaken via traditional mass media.

=== Animal welfare concerns ===
In early 2000, a Deutscher Tierschutzbund (lit.: German Animal Protection Union) representative claimed that the premise of the Original Crazy Chicken Hunt was emblematic of a general lack of respect towards animals, supposedly encouraging the killing of birds by desensitising players. Anticipating this, Johnnie Walker had the developers of the game tone its violence down multiple times. The end screen also shows a sad Crazy Chicken in a cast with crutches to both imply that the chickens are not killed as well as showing the consequences of violence.

=== Reviews ===
Shortly after its inception, critics have generally regarded the franchise's mainline games as positive experiences, with later entries slowly faring progressively worse.

Several media outlets have complimented Crazy Chicken's accessibility, both in gameplay and hardware requirements, while retaining its graphical appeal. However, the quantity of games, especially during the 2000s, has led to some review outlets expressing concerns regarding the franchise's "monotony", citing even minor changes such as the introduction of motion controls as making certain entries "a lot more fun than [their] predecessors". While the games have been described as "simple but charming", some retail releases have also drawn criticism for their perceived lack of content considering their price.

The Crazy Chicken Kart spin-offs mostly received negative scores, with critics often unfavourably comparing them to the similar Mario Kart games in terms of scope, graphics and controls.

Crazy Chicken: Tiger & Chicken saw more critical success than most other spin-offs, receiving praise for its story, graphics and gameplay.

=== Awards ===
Several entries in the series have won or been nominated for video game-related awards:

- KippenSchieten: 3rd place for "PC Demo" at Bizarre (1998).
- The Original Crazy Chicken Hunt (PC): Won "Platinum Award for at least 200.000 copies sold" by VUD (2000).
- The Original Crazy Chicken Hunt (GBC): Won "Gold Award for at least 100.000 copies sold" by VUD (2001).
- Crazy Chicken 2 (PC): Won "Platinum Award for at least 200.000 copies sold" by VUD (2001).
- Crazy Chicken Kart (PC): Won "Gold Award for at least 100.000 copies sold" by VUD (2004).
- Crazy Chicken X (PC): Won "Gold Award for at least 100.000 copies sold" by VUD (2004).
- Crazy Chicken Jump'n Run - Heart of Tibet: 3rd place for "Best German Casual Game" at Deutscher Entwicklerpreis (2006).
- Moorhuhn The Good, The Egg and The Ugly Mobile: 2nd place for "Best Mobile RPG/Adventure Game" at Deutscher Entwicklerpreis (2006).
- Crazy Chicken: Tiger & Chicken: Won "Best Mobile Core Game" at Deutscher Entwicklerpreis (2013).

== Legacy ==
Today, the Crazy Chicken series is seen as an early example of viral marketing, as well as one of the first video game Internet phenomena in general. The franchise's popularity even caused Germany's authoritative Duden dictionary to include the word "Moorhuhnjagd". By the early 2000s, Crazy Chicken was found to be the most popular video game franchise with children in Germany; ahead of Pokémon, Tomb Raider and The Settlers.

Art Department and its successor company Phenomedia were also notable for being one of the earliest publishers to embrace the internet as a means of encouraging fan interaction and fan labor. Examples of this include the purchase and continuation of the Moorhuhn World forums in 2001 by Phenomedia, as well using the franchise's official website for the collection and publication of high scores and fan art (for which there would also be contests with giveaways). The company would also ask players to submit ideas for new games in the franchise. Furthermore, Phenomedia encouraged modding of their games by occasionally holding competitions, awarding things like high-end PC's or digital cameras to fans who submitted the best add-ins for certain Crazy Chicken games; these could be created via official add-in programs distributed by Phenomedia's partners.

In Germany specifically, the games also sparked a debate about workplace culture, as it became a point of discussion whether or not playing video games during work hours and/or breaks could serve as a justification for firing. In 2000, employees playing Crazy Chicken 2 in the workplace alone was estimated to cost German companies about 135 million Mark per year.

High demand for the franchise also made the games a popular target to be used as Trojan horses, most notably for the CIH virus, being one of the first video games distributed via the internet to do so.

Several developers attempted to leech off the franchise's success by creating video games adopting either part of the Moorhuhn naming conventions (such as Die Rache der Moorhühner, Die Rache der Sumpfhühner or Digitale Hühnerjagd) or recreating its chicken-based shooting gallery gameplay (such as Chicken Shoot, Rauchende Colts, or Chicken Blaster).
