= Home Sweet Home (2007 video game) =

- Developer: Big Blue Bubble
- Publisher: Big Blue Bubble (Note: Published by Intenium to the windows in Europe.)
- Platforms: Windows, Wii (WiiWare)
- Release: Windows; December 12, 2007; Wii: EU: October 24, 2008; NA: November 3, 2008
- Genre: Simulation
- Mode: Single-player

Home Sweet Home is a Windows game developed and published by Big Blue Bubble that was also released for WiiWare on October 24, 2008 in Europe, and on November 3, 2008 in North America. It has been described as a "home decorating sim".

== Overview ==
Home Sweet Home sees players in the role of a home decorator and their team tasked with renovating the homes of a number of clients. Working with a budget and the client's own tastes, players first lay down a blueprint of their design before sending in their team to realize it. Over 400 pieces of furniture will be available in total, with more furniture and game features unlockable as players progress through the game. The game is viewed from a fixed isometric view similar to The Sims or the online game Habbo.

Control in the Wii version is mainly centered on the pointer function of the Wii Remote. However, the player can speed up the building process by using the motion controls to perform tasks such as hammering nails or painting walls.

== Reception ==
Nintendo Life gave Home Sweet Home a score of 6 out of 10. Despite noting "fairly basic" graphics and sound, and the fact that it is not aimed at hardcore gamers, they believed that the game's 50 levels and the ability for the player to design their own dream home would appeal to those who enjoy the design aspects of games such as The Sims.
