= Chicken Shoot =

2000 video game

- Wii cover
- Developers: Toontraxx; Frontline Studios (NDS/Wii)
- Publishers: Zuxxez/TopWare Interactive (Win); DSI Games (NA, GBA/NDS/Wii); Zoo Digital Publishing (EU, GBA/NDS/Wii)
- Platforms: Nintendo DS, Wii, Windows, OS X, Game Boy Advance
- Release: 2000: Windows; NA: 2000 (Online); NA: 2005 Game Boy Advance; EU: September 23, 2005; NA: October 18, 2005 Wii; NA: July 5, 2007; EU: August 24, 2007; AU: September 27, 2007 Nintendo DS; NA: July 10, 2007; PAL: August 24, 2007
- Genre: Shooter
- Modes: Single-player, multiplayer

Chicken Shoot is a video game developed by Toontraxx. It first released online in 2000 for Microsoft Windows and has since been released for Nintendo DS, Wii, and Game Boy Advance.

The Windows version received positive reviews, while reviews for the Game Boy Advance version were mixed, and both the Wii and DS versions were panned by critics.

A sequel, "Chicken Shoot 2", was released in 2005.

== Reception ==
Reception

Aggregate scores
Aggregator	Score			
Aggregator	DS	GBA	PC	Wii
GameRankings	12%	55%	81%	26%
Metacritic	19/100	N/A	N/A	27/100

Review scores
Publication	Score			
Publication	DS	GBA	PC	Wii
GameSpot	N/A	N/A	N/A	2.5/10
GameZone	N/A	N/A	N/A	3/10
IGN	N/A	N/A	N/A	2/10
NGamer	N/A	N/A	N/A	7%

While the original 2000 PC version received positive reviews from critics, and the later Game Boy Advance version receiving mixed to positive reviews, The Wii version was panned by critics as it received "generally unfavorable reviews", while the DS version received "overwhelming dislike", according to the review aggregation website Metacritic.

In 2015, GamesRadar ranked it at #62 on their list of the 100 worst games of all time. The staff described it as shovelware and considered it the worst game on the Wii.
