= Gigaset ME =

Smartphone model

- Manufacturer: Gigaset Mobile
- Availability by region: 2016
- Predecessor: Siemens SX1
- Compatible networks: GSM 850/900/1800/1900/2100, GPRS, EDGE; UMTS 900/2100, HSDPA, HSUPA, HSPA+, LTE, LTE-A
- Dimensions: 144.5 mm × 69.4 mm × 7.7 mm (5.69 in × 2.73 in × 0.30 in)
- Weight: 160 g (5.6 oz)
- Operating system: Android 5.1 Lollipop
- CPU: Qualcomm Snapdragon 810 MSM8994 2 GHz octa-core
- GPU: Qualcomm Adreno 430
- Memory: 3 GB RAM
- Storage: 32 GB eMMC Flash
- Removable storage: microSDXC, up to 128 GB
- Battery: 12.9 Wh, 3000 mAh Li-ion, Talk time 2G: 27 h, Talk time 3G: 26 h, Standby 2G: 361 h
- Rear camera: 16.0 MP, autofocus, Dual-LED-flash
- Front camera: 8.0 MP
- Display: 1920 x 1080 pixels IPS capacitive touchscreen
- External display: 5.0 inches
- Connectivity: Bluetooth 4.1, WLAN 802.11 a/b/g/n/ac, microUSB 3.1, IR Blaster, 3.5 mm headset port
- Data inputs: Multi-touch, capacitive touchscreen Accelerometer; A-GPS; Fingerprint recognition Heart rate sensor Position sensor proximity sensor light sensor (UV)

The Gigaset ME is an Android smartphone by Gigaset Mobile which was widely associated with the line of DECT telephones by Siemens. It will be the Siemens' second smartphone after SX1 which was unveiled more than a decade ago. It was announced in February 2016. Gigaset does not use Google's standard keyboard but installs the popular alternative "SwiftKey". The Gigaset ME is a dual-SIM smartphone.
