= Chicken Shoot 2 =

2003 video game

- Developers: Toontraxx; Frontline Studios (GBA)
- Publishers: Zuxxez/TopWare Interactive (Win); DSI Games (NA, GBA); Zoo Digital Publishing (EU, GBA)
- Platforms: Windows, Game Boy Advance
- Release: Windows: DE: 17 December 2003; CZ: 25 September 2006; GBA: NA: 2005; FR: 25 April 2006
- Genre: Shoot 'em up
- Mode: Single-player

Chicken Shoot 2 is a 2003 video game developed by Toontraxx and published by Zuxxez Entertainment for Microsoft Windows. A version for the Game Boy Advance was developed by Frontline Studios and Vivid Design and published by DSI Games in 2005. Upon release, the game received negative reviews.

== Gameplay ==
Game Boy Advance gameplay screenshot

The objective of Chicken Shoot 2 is to target a crosshair and shoot down chickens as they fly cross the screen before a time limit expires. The game features an Arcade mode, in which players progress across a set of levels to eliminate a minimum set number of chickens, and a Classic mode, in which players must shoot as many chickens as possible in a time limit. The game has an adjustable difficulty. Backgrounds are themed on exotic locations such as beaches, deserts and ski resorts, and have additional interactive elements such as balloons that can be shot for bonus points. Players have five weapons at their disposal, including a pistol, knife, machine gun and shotgun. The game also features a multiplayer game mode that can accommodate up to four players, supported by an online leaderboard for PC, and the Game Link Cable for Game Boy players.

== Reception ==
Reception

Review scores
Publication	Score	
Publication	GBA	PC
AllGame	2.5 / 5	
GameZone	4.5/10	
PC Action		41%

Several critics considered Chicken Shoot 2 to be derivative of other titles, including Moorhuhn and Elf Bowling. PC Action found the game enjoyable for its "fun details and hidden targets" and multiplayer mode. Describing the game as a "straightforward, gallery style shooter with no extras", GameZone critiqued the game's "minimal" visuals, "simple" action and lack of depth. Despite praising the game's "convincing" visual presentation, Jeuxvideo felt the game's concept was outdated, the Game Boy Advance version suffered from limited controls using the D-pad, any the game overall had lack of environments and features to justify play.
