= Markt+Technik =

German publisher

- Parent company: Braun Handels
- Founded: 1976
- Country of origin: Germany
- Publication types: Books
- Nonfiction topics: Computers
- Official website: www.mut.de

Markt+Technik is a publisher of books and magazines based on computer topics which was established in 1976. They also publish videogames.

The publisher became well known in the 1980s and 1990s through the publications of computer magazines such as 64'er, Power Play, Happy Computer and Computer Persönlich. The publishing house also published books and software for home computers, in particular for the Commodore 64, including dBASE and GEOS. They also published compendia for programming and PC applications.

In the 1990s, the book business was separated from the magazine business. The magazines were initially spun off into the subsidiary Magna Media Verlag AG and then later (around 1998) introduced into the WEKA Verlagsgruppe.

In February 2013, the Pearson Germany GmbH announced that for economic reasons the publishing series Markt+Technik would end in the summer of 2013 and no more new books would be published.

In May 2014 Braun Handels GmbH bought the rights to the brand, as well as the rights to all past series of books, and reestablished Markt+Technik.
