= Siemens SX1 =

Mobile phone model

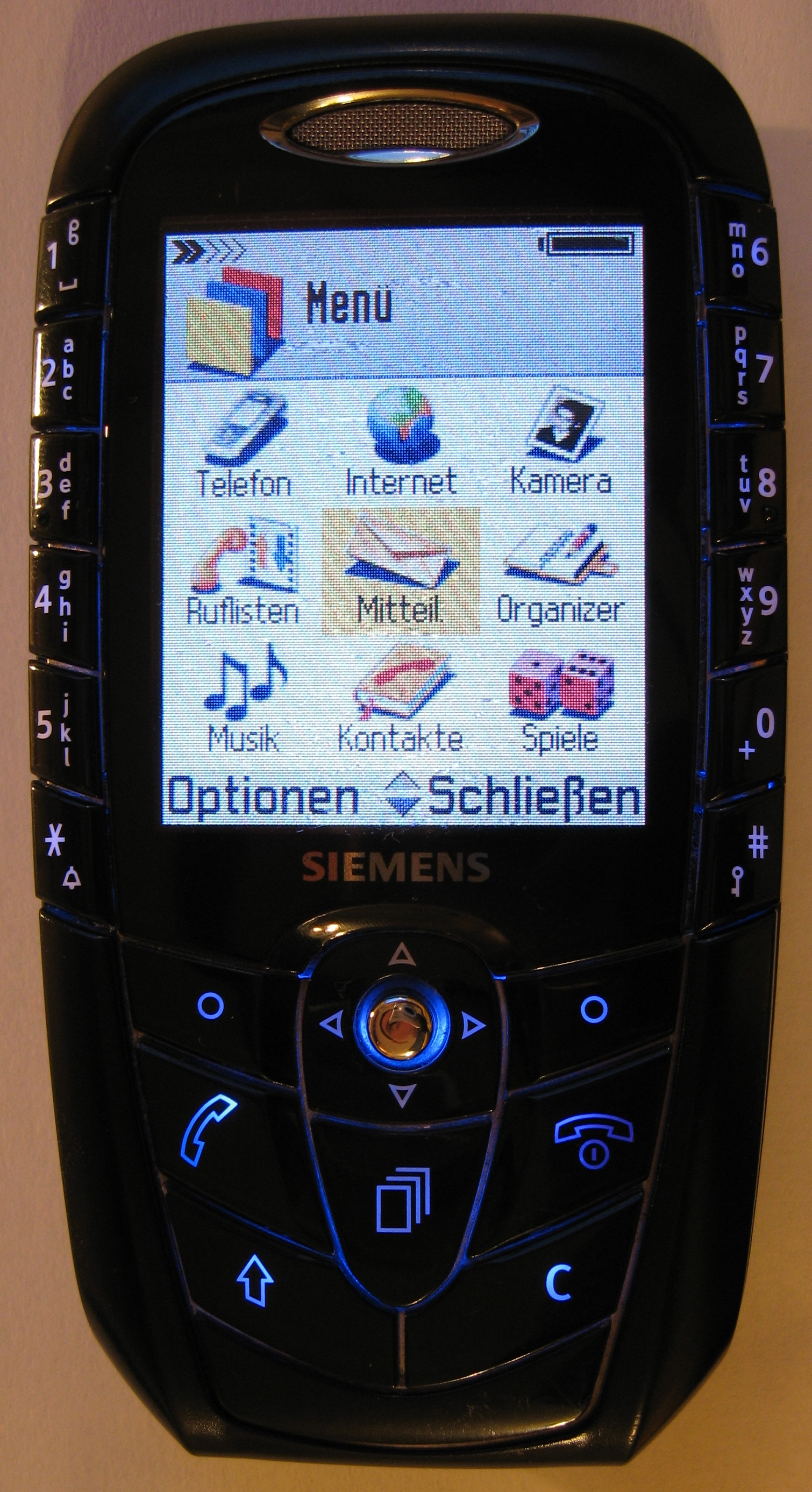
- Manufacturer: Siemens
- Availability by region: 2003—2005
- Successor: Gigaset ME
- Compatible networks: GSM, GPRS
- Form factor: Candybar
- Dimensions: 109×56×19 mm (4.29×2.20×0.75 in)
- Weight: 116 g (4 oz)
- Operating system: Symbian OS v6.1, Series 60 v1.0 UI
- CPU: 120 MHz
- Memory: 4 MB internal memory
- Removable storage: Hot-Swappable MMC (Multimedia Card)
- Battery: Standard, Li-Ion 1000 mAh
- Rear camera: Integrated VGA camera
- Display: 176x220 (65,536 colours) TFT display
- Connectivity: IrDA, Bluetooth
- Data inputs: Unique keypad arrangement

The Siemens SX1 was a GSM mobile phone running version 1.2 of the Series 60 platform for the Symbian OS. It was the first such smartphone from Siemens following its licensing agreement with Nokia for the use and development of Series 60. Though unveiled in February 2003, it was not launched until December 2003.

== Features ==
The phone had a very high feature list for its time of release. It had three built in games and support for more by downloads. The three games which were bundled with the phone were Mozzies, which was awarded the title of best mobile game in 2003, Typegun, which was a game made for acquainting users to the keypad layout, and Sitris, a Tetris version with multiplayer support (via Bluetooth).

A joystick below the screen allowed users to navigate menus on the phone.

== Linux on SX1 ==
A Linux for the mobile exists, one can boot a modified Linux kernel on the mobile using Das U-Boot as a bootloader.
