= Intenium =

Game Publisher

INTENIUM GmbH
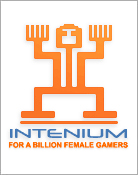
- Company type: Private
- Industry: Casual games
- Headquarters: Hamburg, Germany
- Area served: Worldwide
- Key people: Thorsten Kolisch; Konstantin Nikulin; Stefan Jansen; Nils Wriedt; Alla Khramtsova
- Number of employees: 70+
- Website: intenium.com

Intenium GmbH is a European publisher and distributor of casual games designed primarily for women. The company focuses on social and casual multiplayer online gaming, including Bonga Online, Alamandi and an unannounced product that was first unveiled in closed beta at the very end of 2012.

Intenium started with downloadable games and now operates an online distribution network in Western Europe and has access to European retail chains. Intenium established other consumer products: Deutschland Spielt, Screenseven, Insider Tales, and Alamandi (in partnership with Ravensburger).

== About the company ==
Intenium is headquartered in Hamburg, Germany. The game development branch - Intenium Studio - is based in Kaliningrad, Russia.

Intenium maintains strong relationships with online and retail distribution partners in Europe (such as Saturn, Karstadt, Auchan, Bart Smit, and Tesco). Currently, Intenium launches around 200 new products each year.

Intenium holds IP rights to several casual games on several platforms. Games are released in English, German, French, Dutch, Spanish, Italian, Sweden, Polish, Russian, Korean, and Japanese. Among self-developed series of products are the following: Beetle Bug, Lost Lagoon, Insider Tales, and Diamond Drop.

In 2015, Intenium was purchased and fully integrated into the Gamigo group, which owns the rights to the MMO game Trove.

== Business model ==
Intenium uses freemium as their primary business model, where their games are accessible free of charge. Still, a premium is charged for advanced features by way of microtransactions or via subscription.

Downloadable games have historically been a big part of Intenium's business, being some of the first games the business started with. Therefore, the business model called try before you buy is also widely used within the company in its classical offerings.

Furthermore, Intenium's CDs are carried by retailers under the Deutschland Spielt brand.

== Distribution network ==
The distribution network of Intenium consists of their own national Deutschland-Spielt and their own international casual game portals as well as internationally active partner portals in the US, UK, France, Scandinavia, Russia, and the Netherlands, as well as Bild.de and Sat1.de, bringing gaming sections to their portals.

== Alamandi ==
Alamandi is a free-to-play multiplayer online game world targeted at core casual game consumers.

The game allows users to travel between different locations while co-operatively solving different tasks in the online world and, at the same time, exploring it. Players can go to one of the mini-games and compete for treasures, customize their game characters, and build their own homes in the world of Alamandi. Most recognized by players of the mini-games are Turtle (a match-3 game), bingo and yahtzee.

Alamandi is characterized by numerous social networking elements and extensive interaction opportunities between the players. Playing in Alamandi is free. The business model is based on microtransactions (item-selling, game credits) and subscription (Memberships), which isn't mandatory for the players.

== Bonga Online ==
On November 17, 2011, INTENIUM launched the Open Beta version of this browser-based online game, Bonga Online.

Bonga Online is the first browser online game in the company's portfolio. It was developed in their development unit, INTENIUM Studio, in Kaliningrad. Gameplay was developed specifically for the female audience and is based on the principle of Tamagotchi.

In the middle of 2012, Bonga Online launched on Facebook and several other social networks.

In January 2013, Bonga Online was nominated for Best Casual Browser MMO of 2013 presented by Game Genetics. The MMO of the Year 2013 features a total of 20 categories across all platforms. As stated in the voting rules, there are two titles awarded per category, one voted by the jurors and the other one by the audience. Counting more than half a million visitors and fifty thousand validated votes, last year's contest has been the biggest one so far.

== List of games ==
=== Online games ===
- Alamandi
- Bonga Online

=== Downloadable games ===
- Azteca
- Beetle Ju by OXXO Media and Alawar Entertainment
- Beetle Bug
- Beetle Bug 2
- Beetle Bug 3
- Bengal
- Chicken Rush
- Chicken Rush Deluxe
- Revenge of the Chicken by OXXO Media and Alawar Entertainment
- Chicken’s Revenge Deluxe
- Diamond Drop by OXXO Media and Alawar Entertainment
- Diamond Drop 2
- Elven Mists
- Elven Mists 2
- Fairy Jewels
- Fairy Jewels 2
- Neptunia
- Scepter of Ra
- Green Valley
- Insider Tales: The Stolen Venus
- Insider Tales: The Secret of Casanova
- Insider Tales: Vanished in Rome
- Insider Tales: The Stolen Venus 2
- Lost Lagoon: The Trail of Destiny
- Lost Lagoon 2: Cursed & Forgotten
- Tulula: The Secret Of The Volcano
- Aerie: The Spirit of The Forest
- Exorcist
- Exorcist 2
- Exorcist 3: Inception of Darkness
- Sandra Fleming Chronicles: Crystal Skulls
- Whispered Stories: Sandman
- Gardens Inc.: From Rakes to Riches
